= List of fire stations in Hong Kong =

The following is a list of fire stations of the Hong Kong Fire Services.

All but one of Hong Kong's fire stations are located in Hong Kong (Shenzhen Bay is located across the border in Shekou, Shenzhen)

== Hong Kong Command ==
=== West Division ===
Name	Photographs	Location	Notes/References
Kennedy Town Fire Station (堅尼地城消防局)		6 Kennedy Town New Praya, Kennedy Town; 22.2838°N 114.12809°E	
Aberdeen Fire Station (香港仔消防局暨救護站)		1 Nam Fung Road, Aberdeen; 22.250444°N 114.173991°E	
Chung Hom Kok Fire Station (舂坎角消防局)		37 Chung Hom Kok Road, Stanley; 22.220109°N 114.203511°E	
Ap Lei Chau Fire Station (鴨脷洲消防局)		300 Ap Lei Chau Bridge Road, Ap Lei Chau, Hong Kong	
Pok Fu Lam Fire Station (薄扶林消防局)		789 Victoria Road, Pok Fu Lam, Hong Kong 22.253222°N 114.139154°E	
Sandy Bay Fire Station (沙灣消防局)		331 Victoria Road, Sandy Bay	

=== Central Division ===
Name	Photographs	Location	Notes/References
Sheung Wan Fire Station (上環消防局)		2 Western Fire Services Street, Sheung Wan; 22.28908°N 114.14779°E	
Central Fire Station (中區消防局)		15 Cotton Tree Drive, Central, Hong Kong; 22.278216°N 114.161437°E	
Kong Wan Fire Station (港灣消防局)		14 Harbour Road, Wan Chai; 22.280416°N 114.173024°E	
Victoria Peak Fire Station (山頂消防局)		No. 7, Gough Hill Path, Victoria Peak; 22.265278°N 114.152222°E	The building is also the Former Peak School. Listed as a Grade II historic building since 2009.
Wan Chai Fire Station (灣仔消防局)		435 Hennessy Road, Wan Chai; 22.279713°N 114.181383°E	Listed as a Grade II historic building since 2022.
Kotewall Fire Station		60 Kotewall Road, Pok Fu Lam; 22.279725°N 114.13839°E	

=== East Division ===
Name	Photographs	Location	Notes/References
North Point Fire Station		323 Java Road, North Point, Hong Kong	
Shau Kei Wan Fire Station		34 Chai Wan Road, Shau Kei Wan	
Chai Wan Fire Station		80 Sheung On Street, Chai Wan	
Sai Wan Ho Fire Station		20 Wai Hang Street, Sai Wan Ho	
Tung Lo Wan Fire Station		111 Victoria Park Road, Causeway Bay; 22.28547°N 114.19026°E	
Braemar Hill Fire Station		170 Tin Hau Temple Road, North Point; 22.288154°N 114.201714°E	

=== Marine and Offshore Islands Division ===
Name	Photographs	Location	Notes/References
Discovery Bay Fire Station		1 Discovery Bay Road, Discovery Bay	
Tai O (Sub-Division) Fire Station		120 Tai O Road, Tai O	
Tai O (Old) Fire Station		102 Shek Tsai Po Street, Tai O 22.255177°N 113.860315°E	
Mui Wo Fire Station		12 Ngan Kwong Wan Road, Mui Wo, Lantau Island	
Cheung Sha Fire Station		33 South Lantau Road, Lantau Island; 22.236730°N 113.955653°E	
Lamma Fire Station		30 Yung Shue Long Old Village, Lamma Island; 22.225557°N 114.114996°E	
Cheung Chau Fire Station		1 Ping Chong Street, Cheung Chau	
Peng Chau Fire Station		16 Po Peng Street, Peng Chau	

== Kowloon Command ==
=== West Division ===
Name	Photographs	Location	Notes/References
Mong Kok Fire Station (旺角消防局)		181 Tong Mi Road. Mong Kok; 22.323838°N 114.164610°E	
Cheung Sha Wan Fire Station (長沙灣消防局)		429 Cheung Sha Wan Road, Cheung Sha Wan; 22.335947°N 114.155137°E	
Lai Chi Kok Fire Station (荔枝角消防局)		4 Po Lun Street, Lai Chi Kok, Kowloon; 22.33622°N 114.143122°E	
Shek Kip Mei Fire Station (石硤尾消防局)		380 Nam Cheong Street, Shek Kip Mei	
Kowloon Tong Fire Station (九龍塘消防局)		3 Baptist University Road, Kowloon Tong	

=== South Division ===
Name	Photographs	Location	Notes/References
Tsim Sha Tsui Fire Station		333 Canton Road, Tsim Sha Tsui 22.301269°N 114.167684°E	
Hung Hom Fire Station		30 Fat Kwong Street, Hung Hom, Kowloon	
Tsim Tung Fire Station		1 Hong Chong Road, Tsim Tung, Kowloon	aka. Tsim Sha Tsui East Fire Station. Part of the Hong Kong Fire Services Headquarters Building complex
Yau Ma Tei Fire Station		42 Waterloo Road, Yau Ma Tei	

=== East Division ===
Name	Photographs	Location	Notes/References
Kwun Tong Fire Station		426 Kwun Tong Road, Kwun Tong, Kowloon; 22.312072°N 114.225951°E	
Yau Tong Fire Station		1 Ko Fai Road, Yau Tong, Kowloon	
Kowloon Bay Fire Station		5 Lam Hing Street, Kowloon Bay; 22.324447°N 114.205732°E	
Lam Tin Fire Station		125 Kai Tin Road, Lam Tin	
Po Lam Fire Station		15 Po Lam Road North, Po Lam; 22.327312°N 114.253186°E	
Tai Chik Sha Fire Station		321 Wan Po Road, Tseung Kwan O Industrial Estate; 22.289833°N 114.274487°E	

=== Central Division ===
Name	Photographs	Location	Notes/References
Ma Tau Chung Fire Station		109 Ma Tau Chung Road, Mau Tau Chung, Kowloon	
Wong Tai Sin Fire Station		28 Fung Tak Road, Wong Tai Sin	
Ngau Chi Wan Fire Station		1 Clear Water Bay Road, Ngau Chi Wan	
Shun Lee Fire Station		33 Lee On Road, Shun Lee, Kowloon	
Kai Tak Fire Station		5 Cheung Yip Street, Kowloon Bay; 22.316577°N 114.211444°E	
Sai Kung Fire Station		1 Hong Kin Road, Sai Kung	

== New Territories Command ==
=== South West Division ===
Name	Photographs	Location	Notes/References
Tsing Yi Fire Station		11 Tsing Yi Heung Sze Wui Road, Tsing Yi 22.350956°N 114.107933°E	
Tsing Yi South Fire Station (青衣南消防局)		100 Tsing Yi Road, Tsing Yi 22.336888°N 114.093787°E	The station is located near Nam Wan, in proximity to numerous oil depots, dockyards and other heavy industries.
Tung Chung Fire Station Cum Ambulance Depot		3 Shun Tung Road, Tung Chung 22.285256°N 113.941739°E	
Chep Lap Kok South Fire Station, Former name Chep Lap Kok Fire Station		10 Catering Road East, Chek Lap Kok	
Ma Wan Fire Station		36 Pak Yan Road, Ma Wan 22.347613°N 114.060048°E	
Penny's Bay Fire Station		8 Long Yan Road, Penny's Bay, North Lantau Island	
Hong Kong-Zhuhai-Macao Bridge Fire Station cum Ambulance Depot		10 Shun Ngon Road, Hong Kong-Zhuhai-Macao Bridge Hong Kong Port Chek Lap Kok	

=== South Division ===
Name	Photographs	Location	Notes/References
Kwai Chung Fire Station		77–79 Hing Shing Road, Kwai Chung; 22.361593°N 114.128440°E	
Tsuen Wan Fire Station		453 Castle Peak Road-Tsuen Wan, Tsuen Wan; 22.375072°N 114.111579°E	
Lai King Fire Station		6 Wa Tai Road, Kwai Chung	
Lei Muk Shue Fire Station		300 Wo Yi Hop Road, Kwai Chung; 22.374819°N 114.136668°E	
Sham Tseng Fire Station Cum Ambulance Depot		32 Castle Peak Road, Sham Tseng; 22.367715°N 114.063139°E	
Tai Lam Chung Fire Station		16 Tai Lam Chung Road, Tai Lam Chung; 22.364043°N 114.020986°E	

=== West Division ===
Name	Photographs	Location	Notes/References
Tuen Mun Fire Station		102 Pui To Road, Tuen Mun; 22.395°N 113.97086°E	
Castle Peak Bay Fire Station		6 Tuen Yee Street, Tuen Mun; 22.382907°N 113.969896°E	
Tin Shui Wai Fire Station		1 Tin Ho Road, Tin Shui Wai; 22.450253°N 114.002051°E	
Pillar Point Fire Station		3 Ho Wan Street, Pillar Point, Tuen Mun; 22.366579°N 113.947122°E	
Fu Tei Fire Station		21 Tuen Fu Road, Tuen Mun	
Lau Fau Shan Fire Station		101 Tin Shui Road, Tin Shui Wai; 22.471562°N 114.002374°E	
Shenzhen Bay Fire Station		Cargo Examination Area, Shenzhen Bay Port	Only fire station not located within Hong Kong

=== East Division ===
Name	Photographs	Location	Notes/References
Sha Tin Fire Station (沙田消防局)		26–28 Yuen Wo Road, Sha Tin; 22.390651°N 114.199956°E	
Siu Lek Yuen Fire Station		1 Yuen Shun Circuit, Sha Tin; 22.383231°N 114.205113°E	
Tin Sum Fire Station (田心消防局)		2 Fu Kin Street, Tai Wai, Sha Tin District; 22.366626°N 114.17622°E	
Ma On Shan Fire Station		1 On Shan Lane, Ma On Shan	
Tai Po Fire Station		3 Ting Kok Road, Tai Po; 22.451359°N 114.164640°E	
Tai Po East Fire Station		68 Ting Kok Road, Tai Po; 22.461925°N 114.190551°E	

=== North Division ===
Name	Photographs	Location	Notes/References
Sheung Shui Fire Station		8 Tin Ping Road, Sheung Shui	
Fanling Fire Station		2 Sha Tau Kok Road, Lung Yeuk Tau, Fanling	
Pat Heung Fire Station		4A Yau Uk Tsuen, Kam Tin Road; 22.441030°N 114.090024°E	
Yuen Long Fire Station		2 Fung Kam Street, Yuen Long; 22.441041°N 114.032503°E	
Sha Tau Kok Fire Station		60 Shun Hing Street, Sha Tau Kok	
Mai Po Fire Station		31 Golden Bamboo Road North, Fairview Park	
Heung Yuen Wai Fire Station		No.199 Lin Ma Hang Road, Ta Kwu Ling, NT	

=== Airport Fire Contingent ===
Name	Photographs	Location	Notes/References
Airport South Fire Station, Former name Main Airport Fire Station		23 South Runway Road, Hong Kong International Airport	
Airport Centre Fire Station, Former name Sub Airport Fire Station		33 Chung Cheung Road, Hong Kong International Airport	

== Former fire stations ==
Former fire stations include:

Name	Photographs	Location	Notes/References
Former Central Fire Station (中環消防總局)		No. 83 Des Voeux Road Central; 22.28461°N 114.15623°E	Demolished. Now the location of the Hang Seng Bank Headquarters Building.
Ex-Western Fire Station (前西區消防局)		No. 12 Belcher's Street, Kennedy Town; 22.285274°N 114.132458°E	Grade II historic building. Converted into the Po Leung Kuk Chan Au Big Yan Home for the Elderly.
Kai Tak Airport Fire Station			Demolished.
Old Kowloon Fire Station		33 Salisbury Road, Tsim Sha Tsui. Part of the 1881 Heritage complex. 22.29477°N 114.170369°E	Listed as a Grade II historic building since 2009.
Former Aberdeen Fire Station		47 Wong Chuk Hang Road, Aberdeen; 22.249146°N 114.167046°E	Demolished.
Former Sha Tau Kok Fire Station		Sha Tau Kok; 22.54563°N 114.2242°E	
Former Kwai Chung Fire Station		Former No.1 Kwai Ting Road, Nowaday No.8 Kwai On Road, Kwai Chung, NT	Demolished. Now the location of Chinabest International Centre
Former Sheung Shui Fire Station		Junction of Jockey Club Road and Fu Hing Street, Sheung Shui, NT	Demolished. Now the location of Fu Wing Mansion
Former Rennie's Mill Fire Station		Former Rennie's Mill Squatters Area	Demolished. Now the approximate location of Choi Fu House, Choi Ming Court, Tseung Kwan O
Former Ta Kwu Ling Fire Station		Junction of Lin Ma Hang Road and Ping Che Road, Ta Kwu Ling; 22.54085°N 114.14932°E	Converted to Ta Kwu Ling Ambulance Depot

== See also ==
- List of fire departments
