= Old Kowloon Fire Station =

Former fire station in Tsim Sha Tsui, Hong Kong

Coordinates: 22.29477°N 114.170369°E

- 前九龍消防局
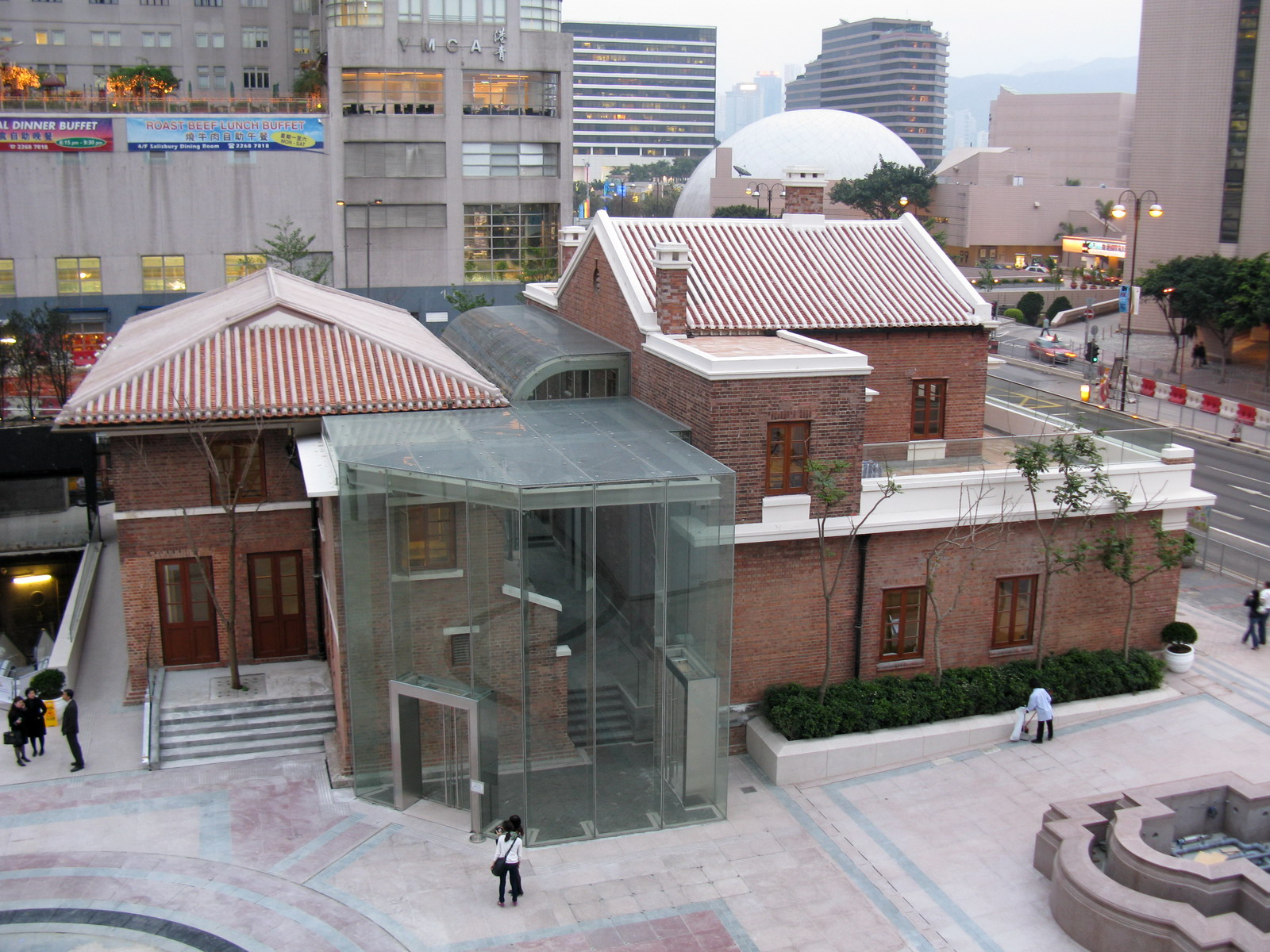
- Old Kowloon Fire Station in 2009.
- Interactive map of the Old Kowloon Fire Station area
- Alternative names: Terminus Fire Station

General information
- Type: Fire station
- Classification: Grade II historic building
- Location: Tsim Sha Tsui, Kowloon, 33 Salisbury Road, Hong Kong
- Current tenants: Shanghai Tang
- Completed: 1920; 106 years ago
- Closed: 1971; 55 years ago
- Owner: Hong Kong Government

Old Kowloon Fire Station
- Traditional Chinese: 前九龍消防局
Transcriptions
Yue: Cantonese
- Yale Romanization: Chìhn gáu lùhng sīu fòhng guhk
- Jyutping: Cin4 gau2 lung4 siu1 fong4 guk6

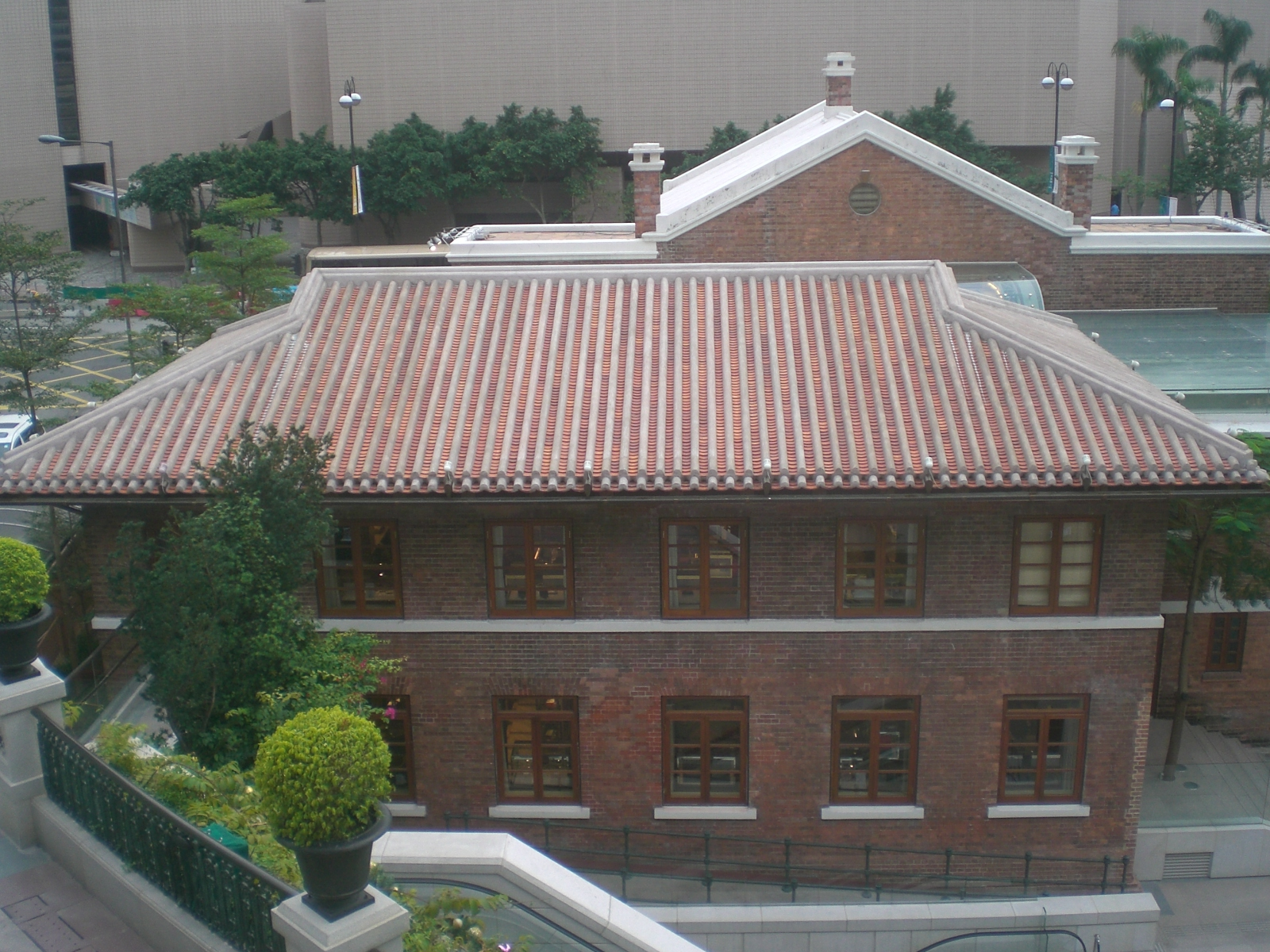
Accommodation block.

The Old Kowloon Fire Station is a former fire station in Tsim Sha Tsui, Kowloon, Hong Kong. Together with the Former Marine Police Headquarters, it is now part of a commercial complex called 1881 Heritage.

The station is located at 33 Salisbury Road, at the corner with Kowloon Park Drive.

The Old Kowloon Fire Station consists of a Main Block and an Accommodation Barrack. The main block was built in 1920, while the two-storey accommodation barrack was completed in 1922. It served as a fire station until 1971, when it was replaced by the Tsim Sha Tsui Fire Station on Canton Road. The fire station was also known as the Terminus Fire Station because of its proximity to the Kowloon station (demolished in 1974), the then south terminus of the British Section of the Kowloon–Canton Railway.

The main block of the fire station has been listed as a Grade II historic building since 2009.

== See also ==
- List of fire stations in Hong Kong
