= China Hong Kong City =

Building complex in Hong Kong

Coordinates: 22.30038°N 114.16777°E

- 中港城

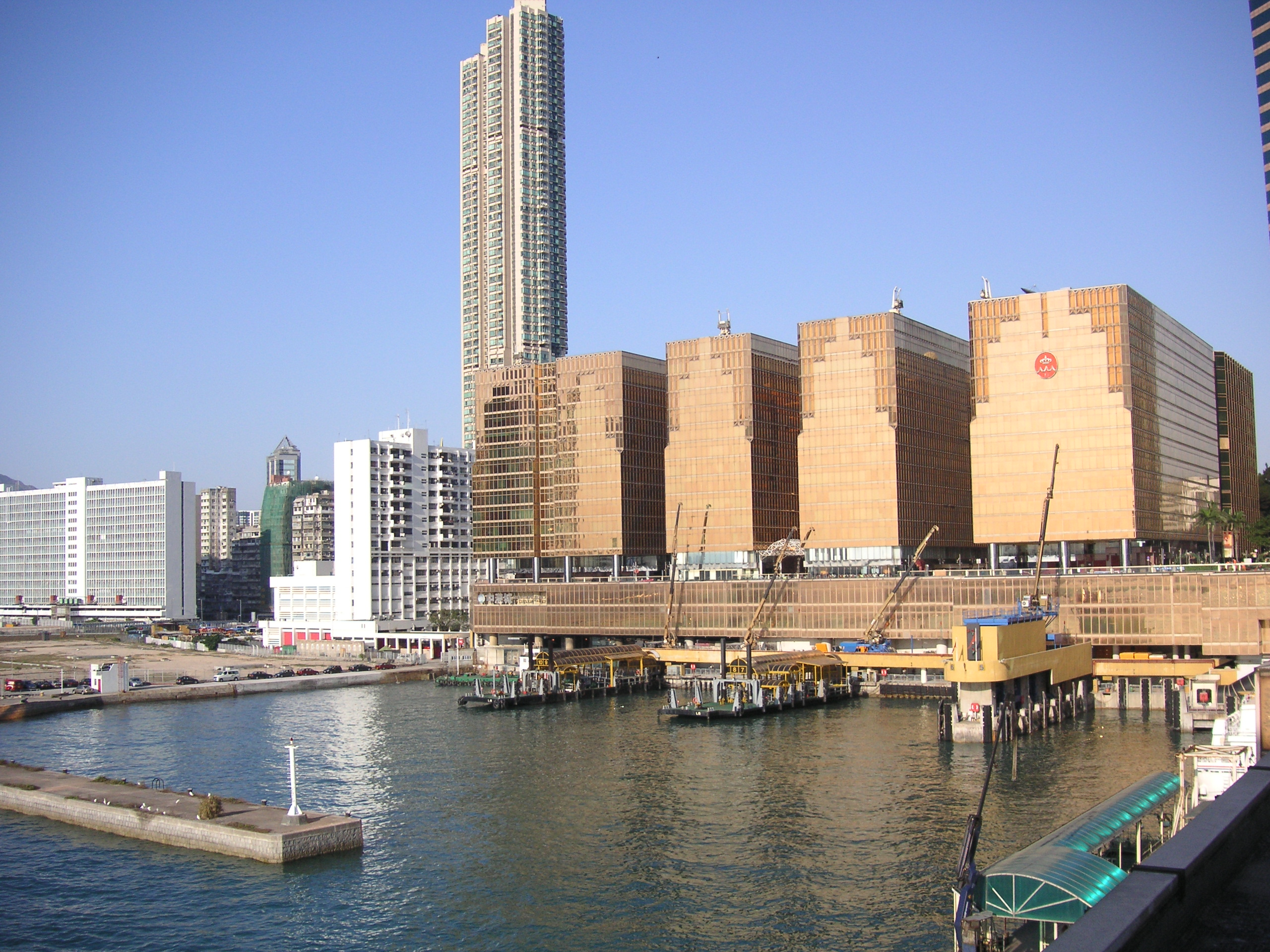
- Location: Kowloon, Hong Kong
- Opened: 1988

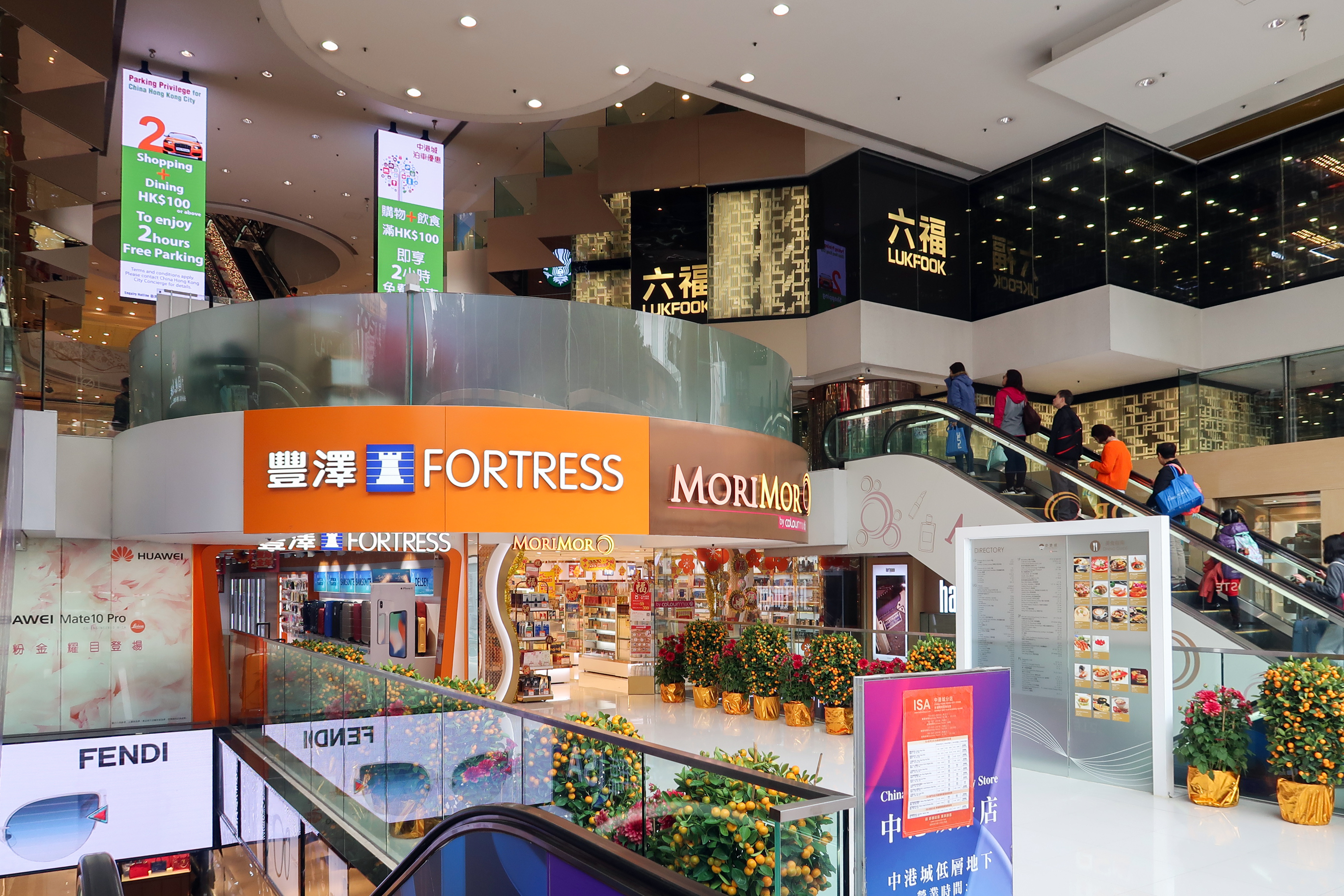
Shopping Centre of China Hong Kong City

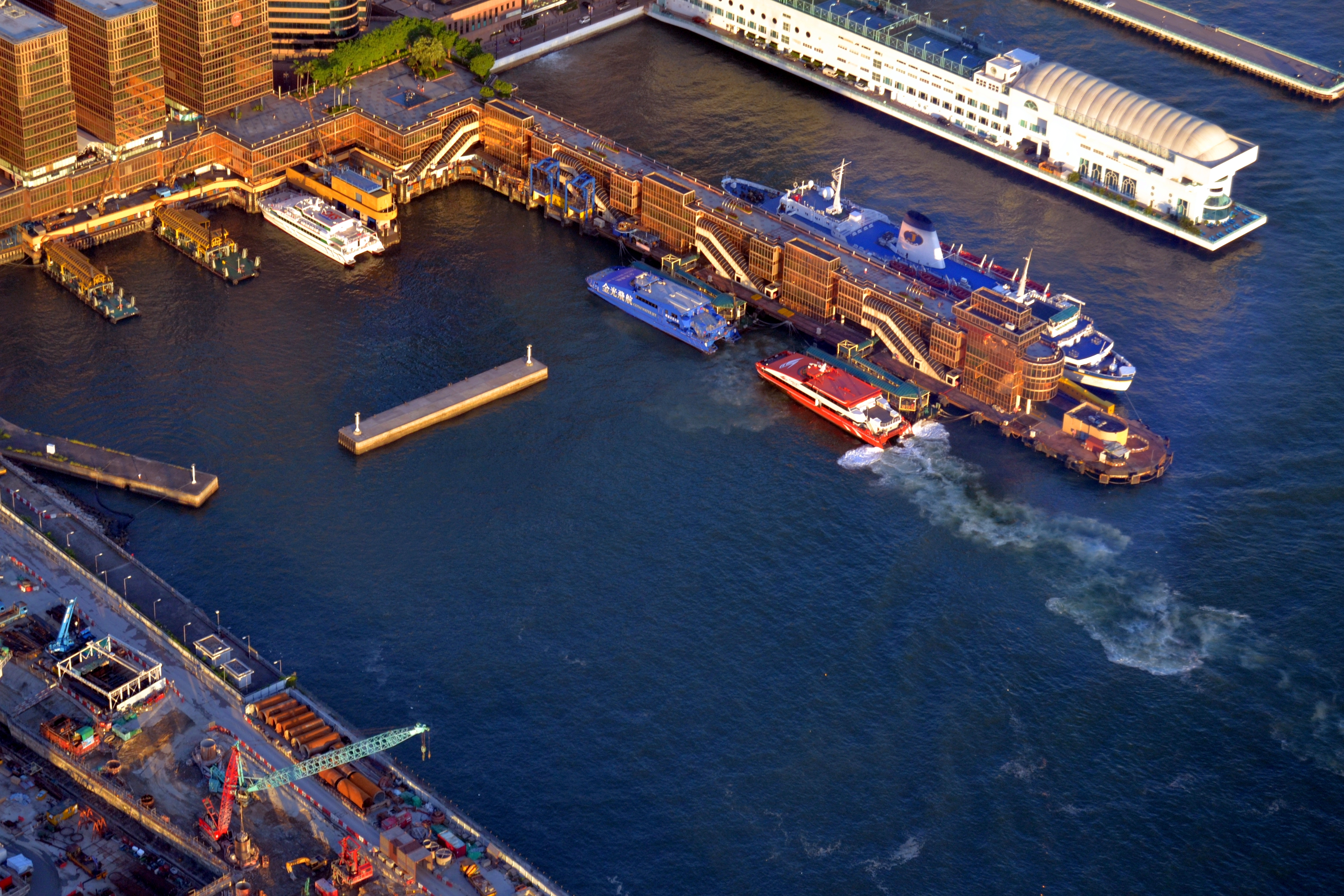
China Ferry Terminal

China Hong Kong City (Chinese: 中港城; Jyutping: zung1 gong2 seng4; pinyin: Zhōng Gǎng Chéng) is a commercial complex that includes five office towers, a shopping centre, a hotel and a ferry terminal in Tsim Sha Tsui, Kowloon, Hong Kong. The complex opened in 1988 on land formerly occupied in part by the Royal Naval Dockyard (subsequently Government Dockyard) and the Sea Terminus (demolished 1969). It is situated along Canton Road, next to The Gateway and the Tsim Sha Tsui Fire Station. The complex is managed by the Sino Group.

According to its Chinese website, it is the largest building in the world with a gold-coloured facade.

== Hotel ==
The Royal Pacific Hotel & Towers, managed by Sino Hotels, is part of the complex. The Royal Pacific Hotel & Towers occupies a significant portion of China Hong Kong City, offering both hotel and serviced apartment accommodations. The hotel is directly connected to the China Ferry Terminal, making it a convenient option for travellers heading to Macau and mainland China. Its facilities include multiple dining outlets, meeting and conference rooms, and fitness amenities, catering to both business and leisure guests. In addition, the hotel is within walking distance of major attractions such as Harbour City, Kowloon Park, and the Hong Kong Museum of Art.

== Transportation hub ==
Below the shopping centre is a bus terminus. The China Ferry Terminal, extended from The Royal Pacific Hotel, provides ferry services to destinations in mainland China and Macau.
