= Tsim Sha Tsui Fire Station =

Fire station in Kowloon, Hong Kong

Coordinates: 22.301269°N 114.167684°E

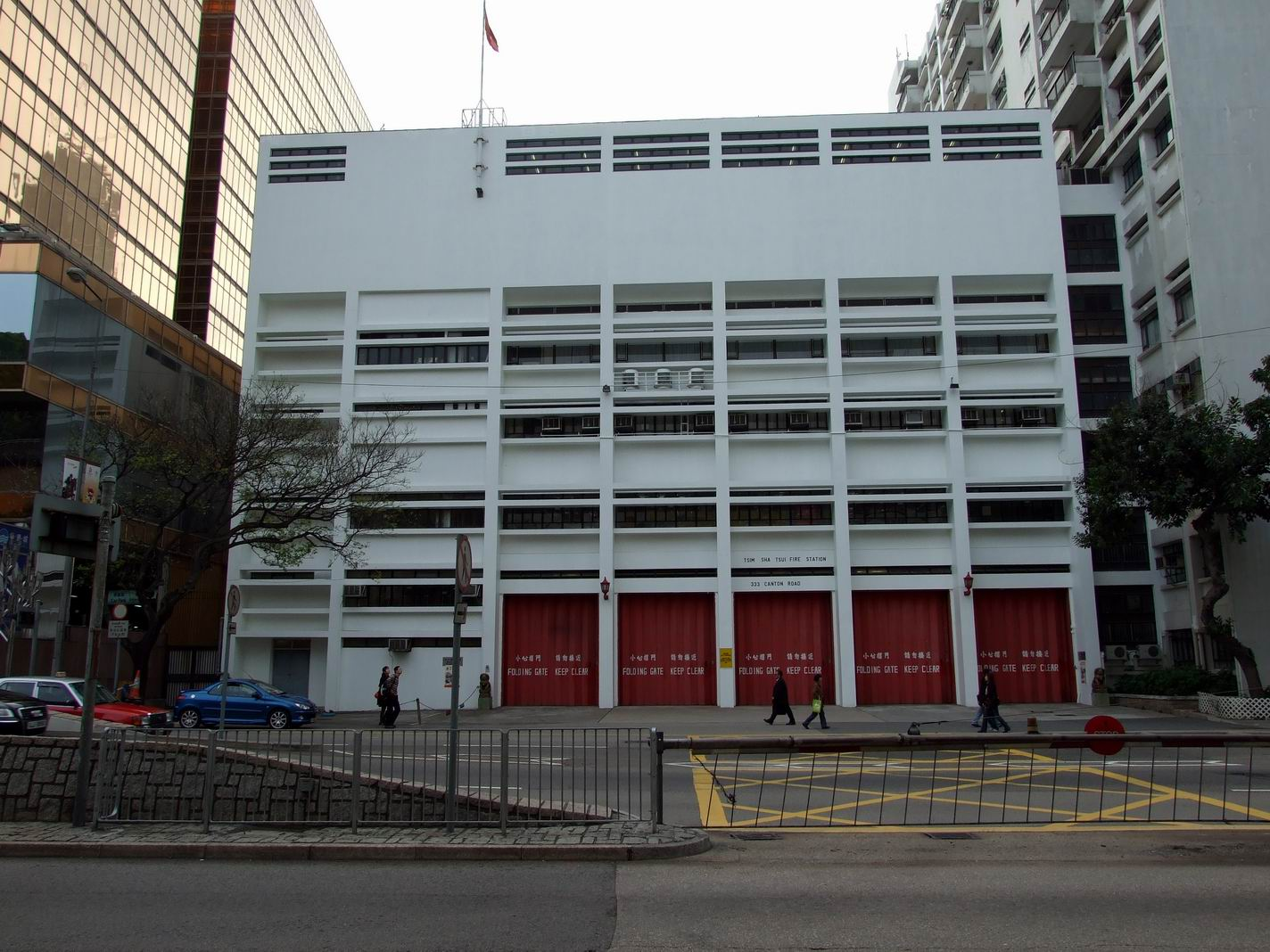
- Tsim Sha Tsui Fire Station along Canton Road
- Traditional Chinese: 尖沙嘴消防局
Transcriptions
Yue: Cantonese
- Yale Romanization: Jīm sāa jéui sīu fòhng guhk
- Jyutping: Zim1 saa1 zoei2 siu1 fong4 guk6

Tsim Sha Tsui Fire Station is a fire station in Tsim Sha Tsui, Kowloon, Hong Kong. The station stands at the Canton Road, adjacent to China Hong Kong City. The front door of the station was styled with old style fire alarm lights and guarded by a pair of lion statues. The site was once a Royal Navy torpedo depot.

== History ==
The Tsim Sha Tsui Fire Station replaced the Old Kowloon Fire Station on Salisbury Road, which ceased operating as a fire station in 1971.

== See also ==
- List of fire stations in Hong Kong
