= Former Marine Police Headquarters =

Declared monument in Tsim Sha Tsui, Hong Kong

1881 Heritage
- 1881
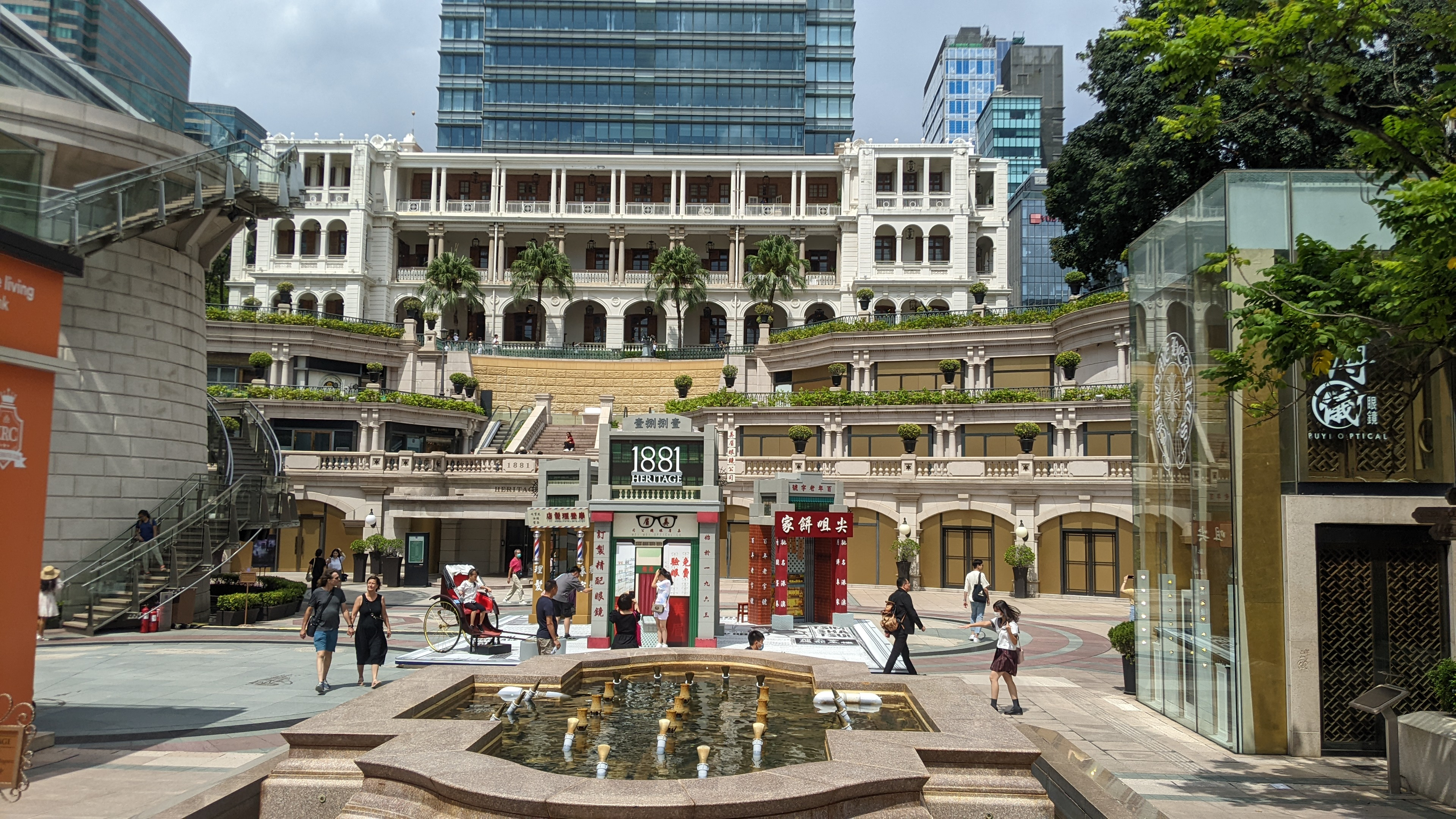
- The Former Marine Police Headquarters Compound as after renovation, viewed north from the entrance on Salisbury Road.
- Interactive map of the 1881 Heritage area
- Former names: Marine Police Headquarters Compound
- Alternative names: Chinese: 前水警總部; Jyutping: Cin4 seoi2 ging2 zung2 bou6

General information
- Status: Declared monument
- Architectural style: Neoclassical
- Location: 2A Canton Road, Tsim Sha Tsui, Kowloon, Hong Kong
- Coordinates: 22.295479°N 114.169994°E
- Completed: 1884; 142 years ago
- Renovated: 2003–09
- Client: CK Asset Holdings Limited

Design and construction
- Architecture firm: Renovation: A+T Design Limited
- Structural engineer: Renovation: AECOM Asia Company Ltd

Website
- http://www.1881heritage.com

The Former Marine Police Headquarters Compound, completed in 1884, is located in Tsim Sha Tsui, Kowloon, Hong Kong. From 1884 to 1996, the Compound served as the headquarters for the Marine Police, which moved to Sai Wan Ho in 1996 and became a branch in the Hong Kong Police Force.

The compound is a declared monument since 1994 as it is one of the four oldest surviving government buildings in Hong Kong. The Compound and the Old Kowloon Fire Station have been re-developed into a heritage hotel with food and beverage outlets and retail facilities in a project headed by architect Daniel Lin of A+T Design, opened in 2009. The site is now officially known as 1881 Heritage.

== History and design ==
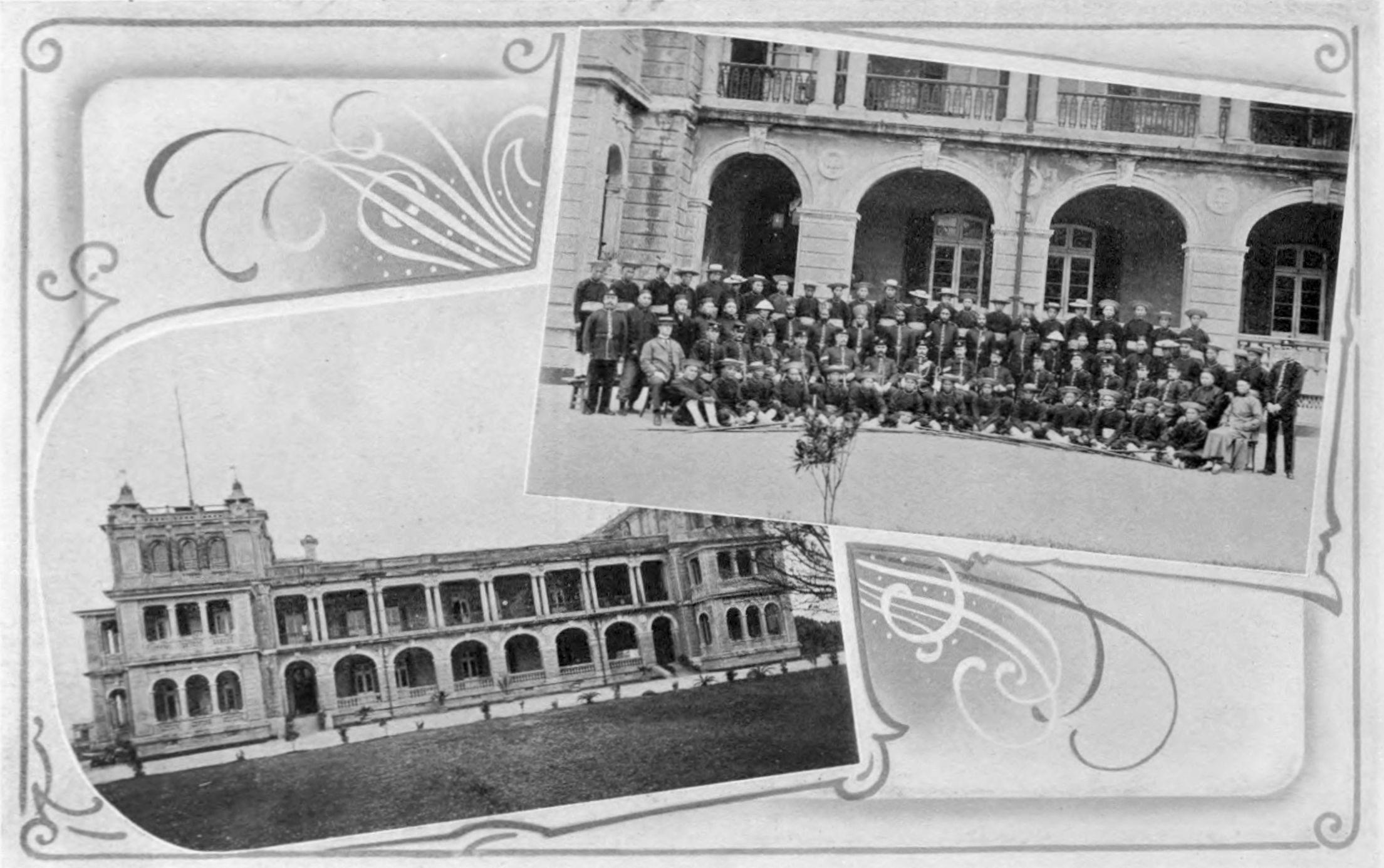
The Marine Police Headquarters in the 1900s. At that time, the building was still a two-storey structure.

The compound was completed in 1884 and served as the headquarters of the Water Police (as they were originally known) until late 1996. The main building was originally constructed on the waterfront, and had a dedicated slip prior to the reclamation of land to create Salisbury Road. To the east, the headquarters faced a sandy beach.

During the Japanese Occupation (1941–1945), the compound was used as a base for the Japanese navy. At this time, an extensive network of tunnels were constructed beneath the lawn but after World War II, these tunnels were blocked and the lawn was returfed for the safety of public.

In the 1970s, the compound lost a large part of its gardens, when the slope to the east was levelled to make way for the construction of Kowloon Park Drive.

The station was colloquially referred to as T-Lands Police Station – probably a reference to Marine Police brevity code for a marine police station on "Land" at "Tsim Sha Tsui". This name is used in at least two novels set in Hong Kong: Soldier of Fortune by Ernest K. Gann, published in 1954; and Dragon Flame by the house author Nick Carter, published in 1966.

=== Redevelopment ===
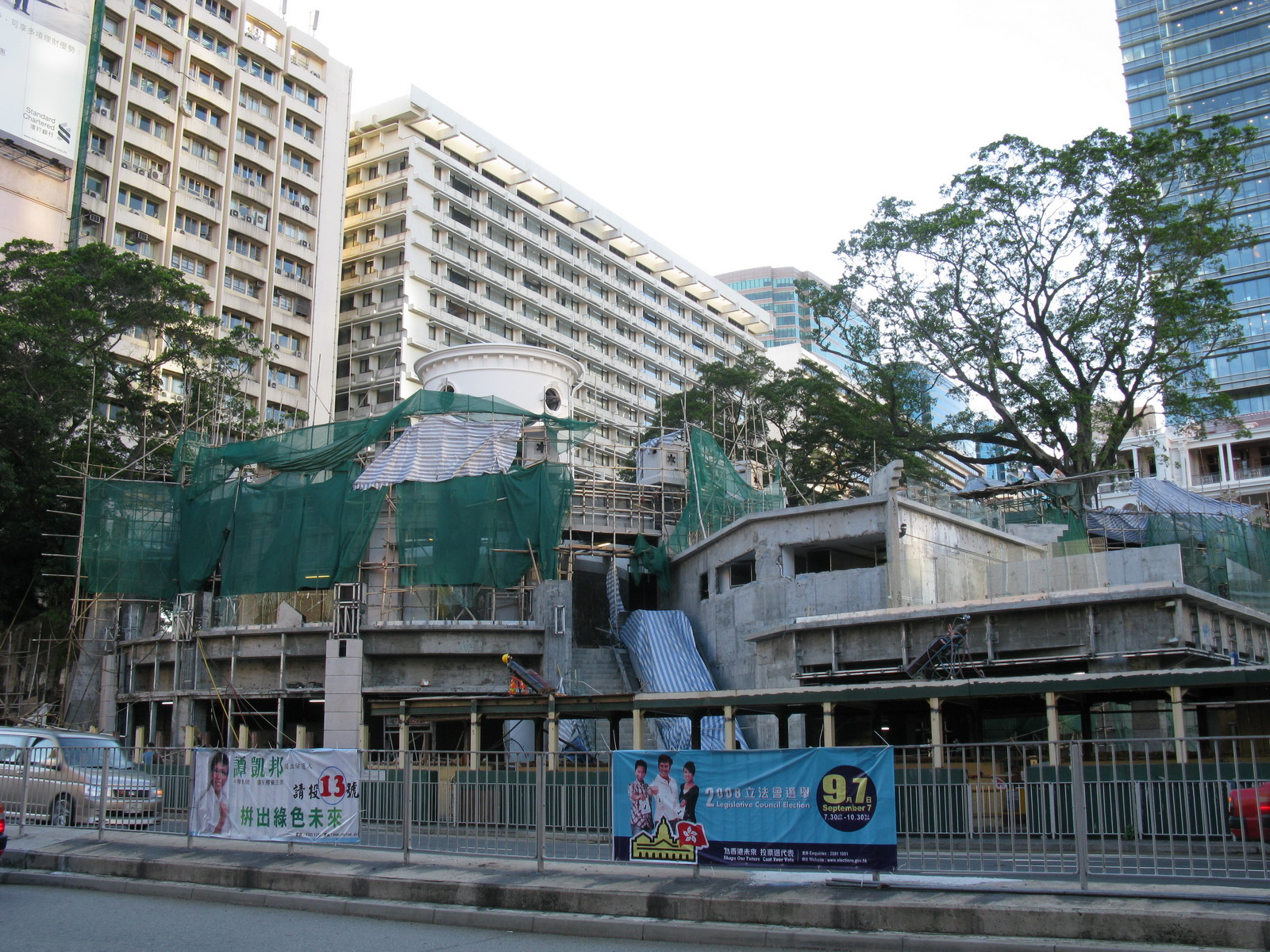
Former Marine Police Headquarters Compound under renovation in 2008

In 2002, the Hong Kong Government announced a competitive tender for an adaptive reuse concept for the former Marine Police Headquarters, which had been vacant since 1996; to entice tenders, the conditions included permission to create up to 7,213 m^{2} (77,640 sq ft) of floor space below the Main Building.

The Government announced on 23 May 2003 that Flying Snow Limited, a subsidiary of Cheung Kong Holdings, had won the 50-year land grant at a tendered price of HK$352.8 million, out of six competitive proposals. The approval allowed the developer to preserve and redevelop the historical building into a heritage tourism facility. Flying Snow has transformed the building into a heritage hotel with food and beverage outlets, and retail facilities. The project was the first private sector-led preservation project in Hong Kong; under the terms of the land grant, specific furnishings and features were required to be preserved and restored. The project opened as 1881 Heritage in 2009, and was criticized for removing most of the trees from what was once a grassy hill.

In 2010, the South China Morning Post reported the estimated floor space in the existing buildings had not been correctly surveyed and was 5,610 m^{2} (60,400 sq ft), instead of the 4,300 m^{2} (46,000 sq ft) originally submitted for the tender; in addition, the finished project added 7,413 m^{2} (79,790 sq ft), an extra 200 m^{2} (2,200 sq ft) above the tender, for which Cheung Kong paid an additional HK$94.5 million. Because the prevailing market rate was HK$1 million per square metre, the under-counted existing floor space and below-market rate paid for the extra construction collectively were estimated to have provided an effective HK$1.5 billion bonus to Cheung Kong Holdings.

== Buildings ==
1881 Heritage sites
1 Main Building & Stable Block
2 Signal Tower
3 Old Kowloon Fire Station & Accommodation Block

The original Marine Police Headquarters comprises the Main Building, Stable Block and Signal Tower. The redevelopment into 1881 Heritage added the nearby Old Kowloon Fire Station and the Fire Station Accommodation Block to the campus.

=== Main Building ===
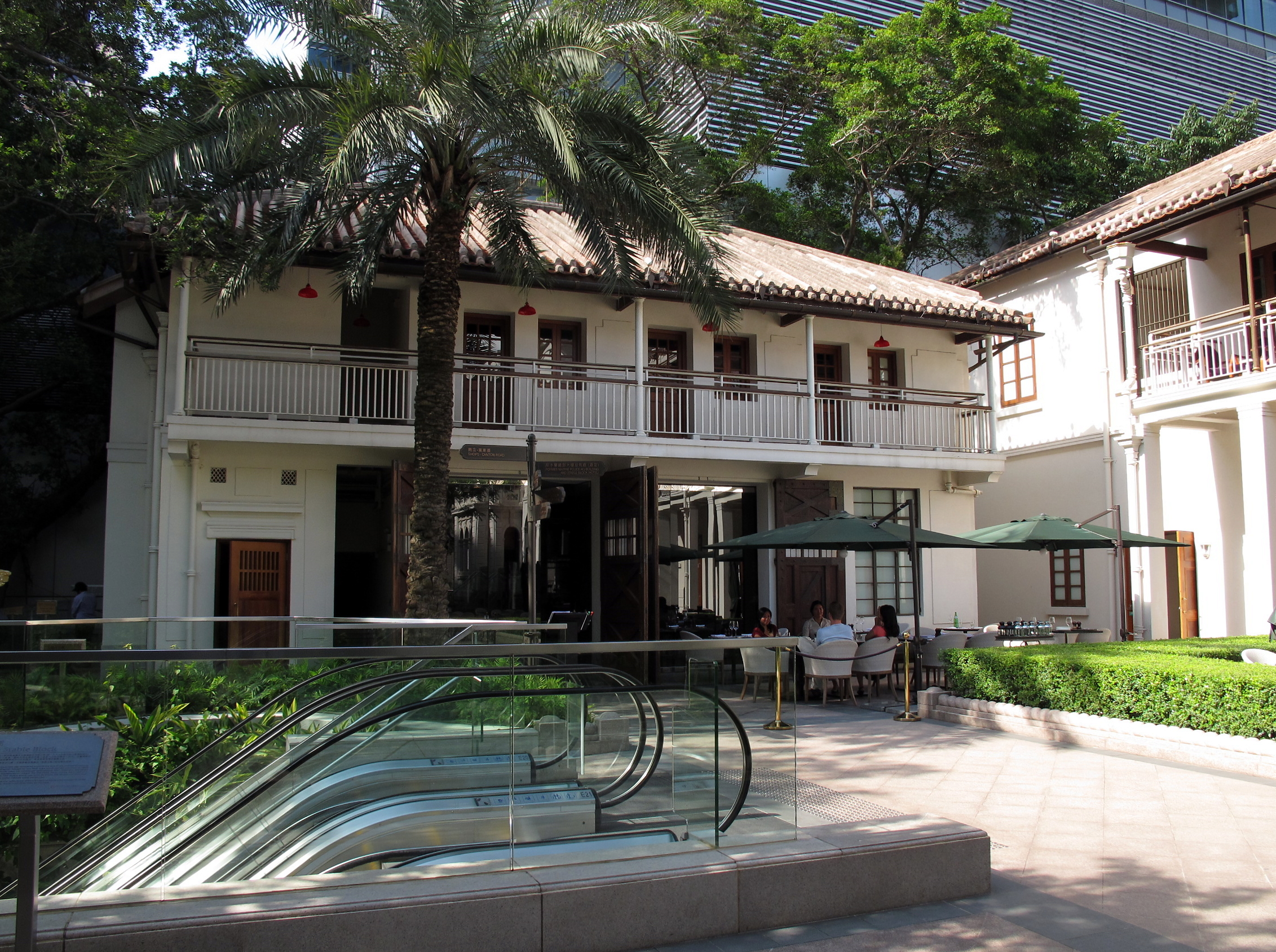
Stables Grill @ Hullett House

The Main Building was originally a two-storey structure; an extra storey was added to the Main Building in the 1920s, and an ancillary building was added to the north. The south-east and south-west wings of the main building served as married quarters, while the top floor of the west wing was the residence for the Superintendent of the Water Police. The Main Building also includes a small jail and carrier pigeon coops on the walls of the courtyard to the north.

Hullett House suites & themes (2016)
Suite	Theme	Ref
South Bay	Art Deco	
Deep Water Bay	Pop Art (China)	
Stanley Bay	English countryside	
Ma Wan	Imperial China	
Silvermine	blanc de Chine (all-white / honeymoon)	
Shek O	Hong Kong antiques (red and gold)	
Kat O	Scottish	
Pui O	1930s Shanghai	
Tai O	Regal chinoiserie	
Tung O	Contemporary luxury (black and gold)	

After the 2003–09 renovation, the Main Building was renamed to Hullett House to honour Richmond William Hullett. It included a small boutique hotel offering ten suites and five restaurants and bars; each of the ten suites had a unique theme, and the Mariner's Rest bar allowed patrons to drink in a former jail cell.

In 2017, Harbour Plaza Hotels and Resorts assumed the management of Hullett House. FWD Group leased the hotel and renamed it House 1881 in 2019; FWD renovated the ten suites, ranging in size from 82.4 to 87.3 square metres (887 to 940 ft^{2}), and five dining concepts.

=== Stable Block ===
The Stable Block is immediately north of the Main Building.

=== Signal Tower ===
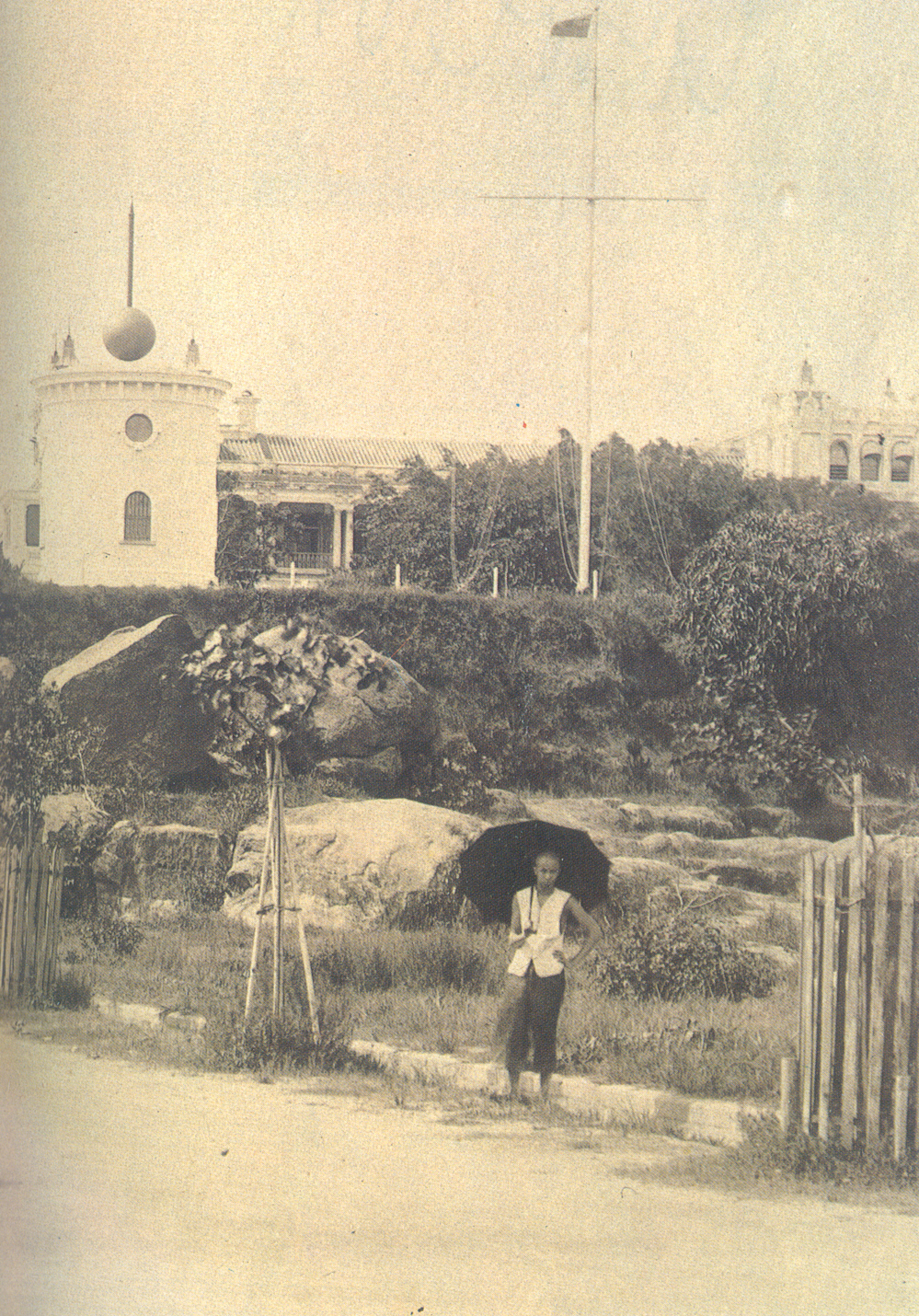
The Signal Tower with time ball in 1908.

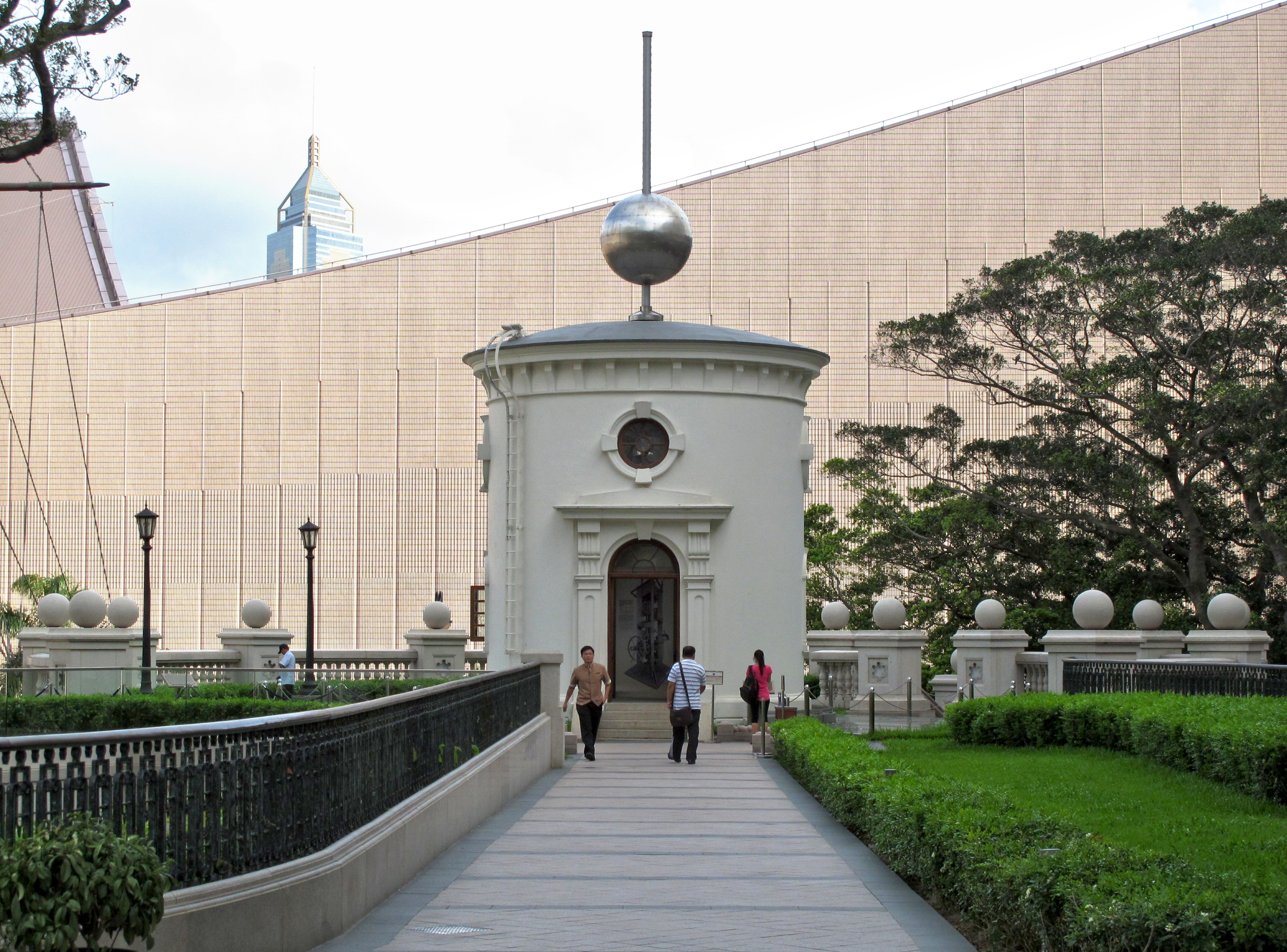
The restored Signal Tower (2010), with Hong Kong Cultural Centre in the background.

The Signal Tower (Chinese: 大包米訊號塔; Jyutping: daai6 baau1 mai5 seon3 hou6 taap3), also known as the Time Ball Tower or Round House, was constructed to provide time signals to ships in the harbour. A ball was hoisted each morning and dropped precisely at 1 PM. Its use diminished in 1907 when the time ball apparatus was removed to Signal Hill, Kowloon.

=== Old Kowloon Fire Station ===
The Old Kowloon Fire Station, also known as the Former Tsim Sha Tsui Fire Station, was originally completed in 1920; a charity shop selling handcrafts occupied the space starting in 1986 until the 2003–09 renovations.

=== Fire Station Accommodation Block ===
The Fire Station Accommodation Block is immediately north of the Old Kowloon Fire station, and was completed in 1922.

== Gallery ==
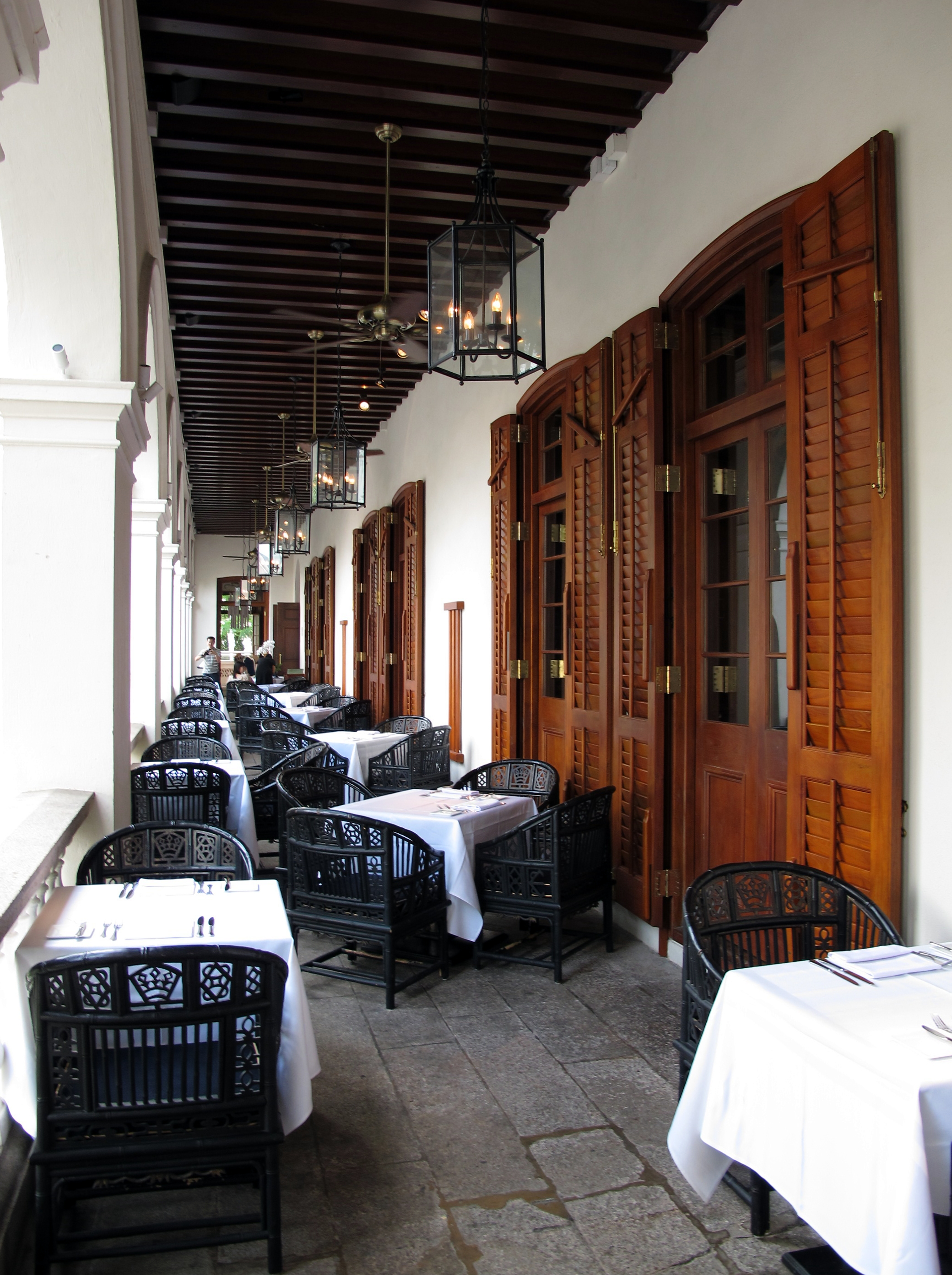
Hullett House Corridor

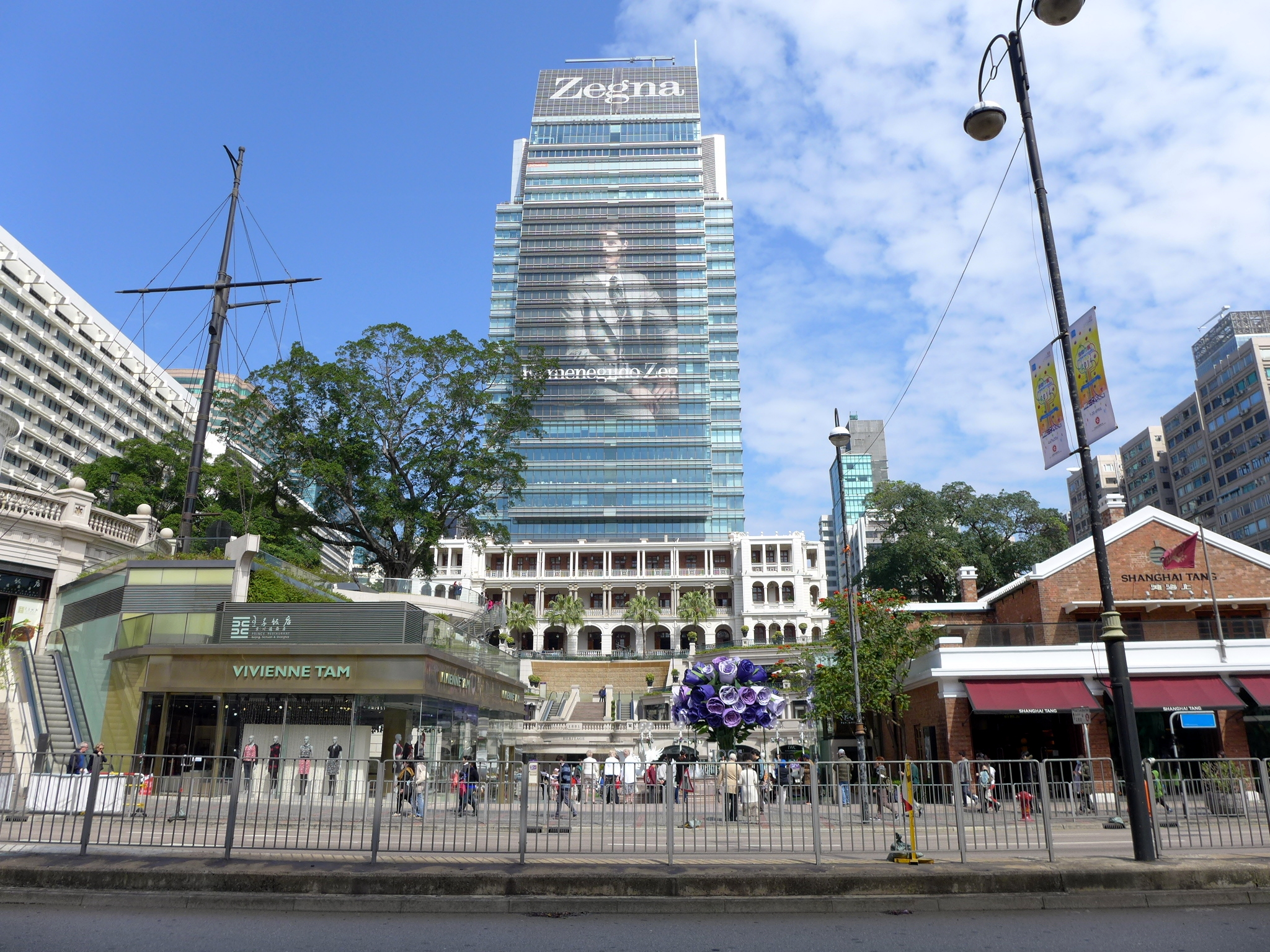
The Former Marine Police Headquarters Compound together with the One Peking Road office building behind it

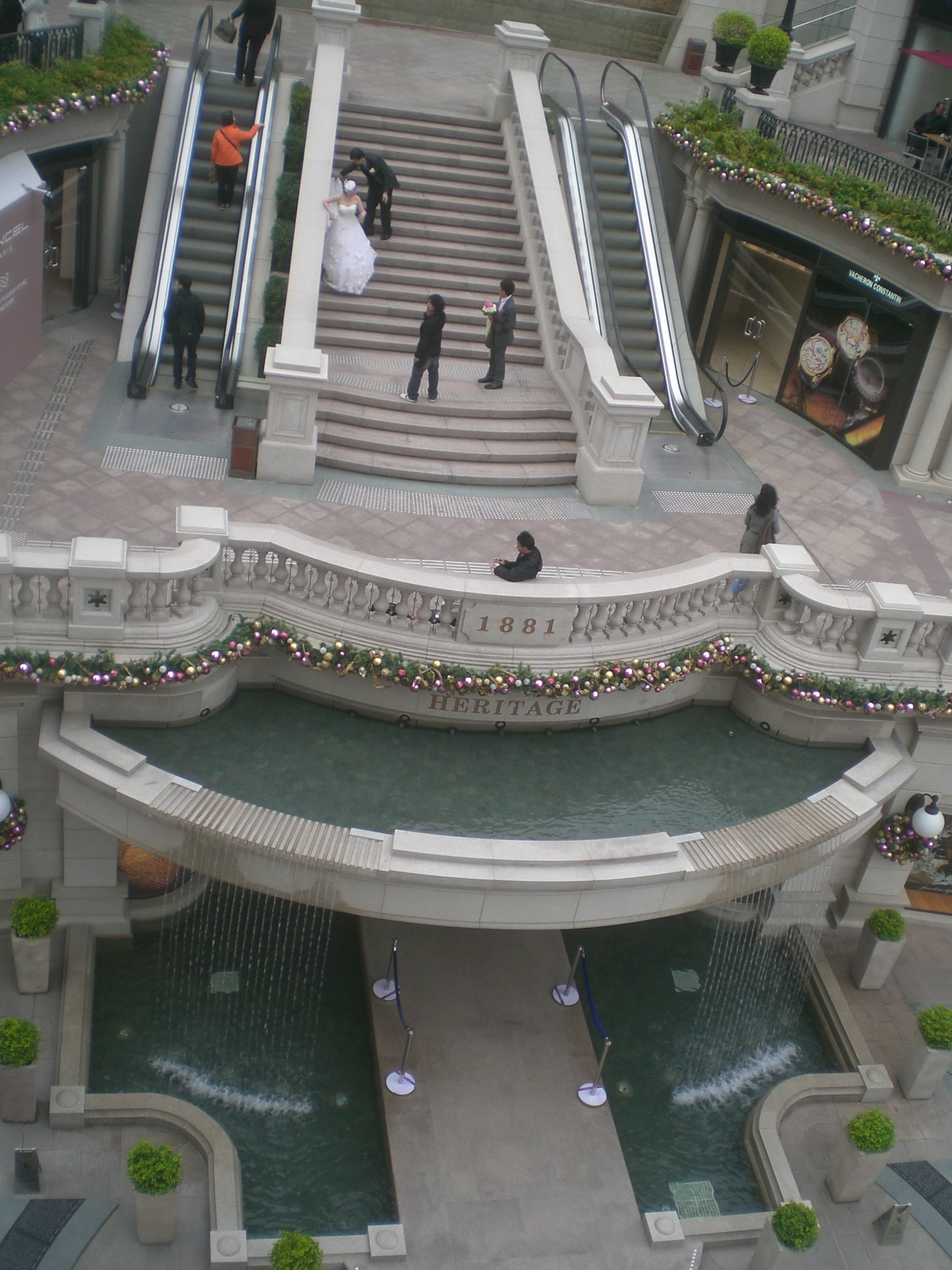
Stairs and waterfalls in front of the main building

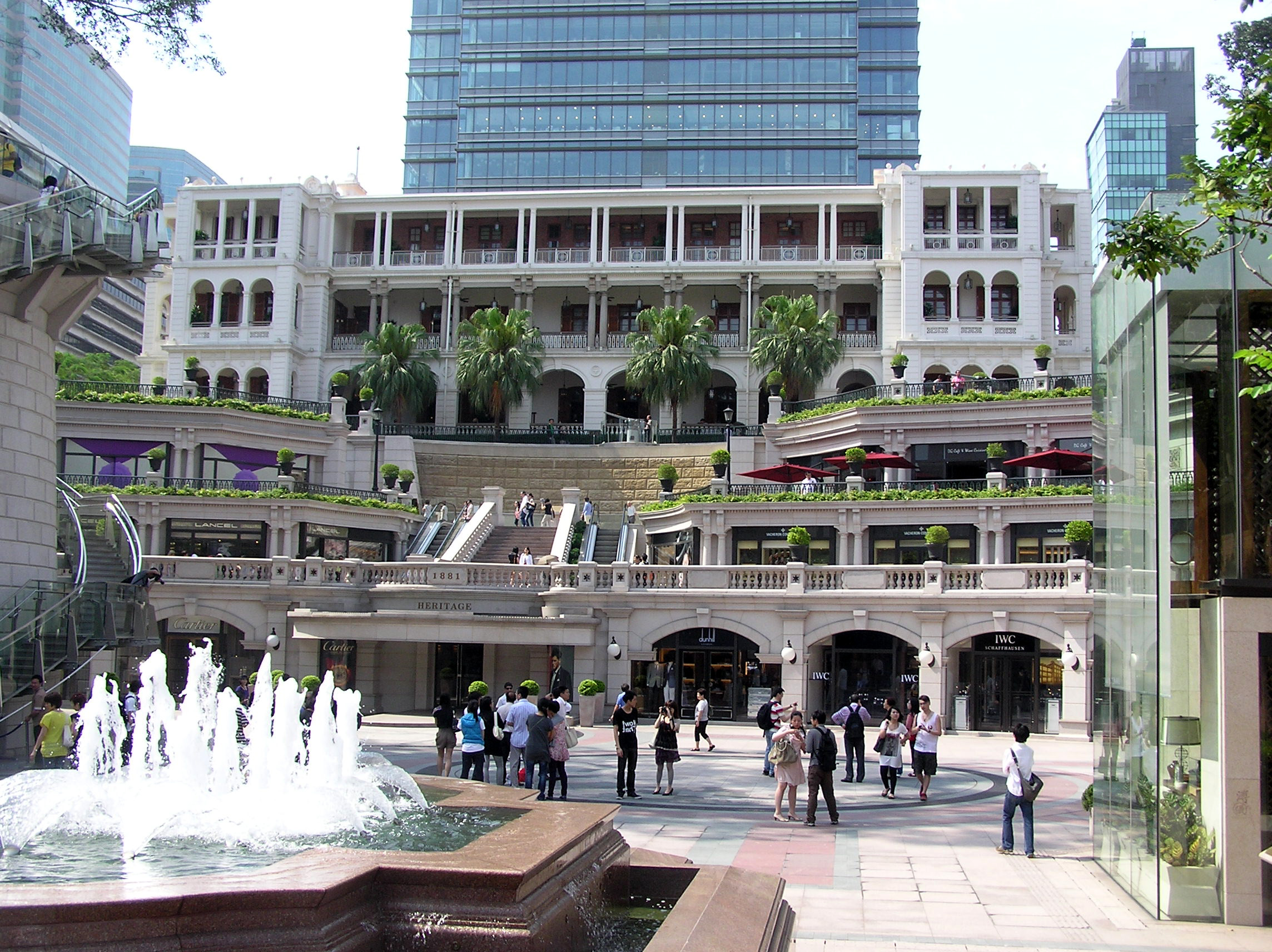
The front of the complex in 2010

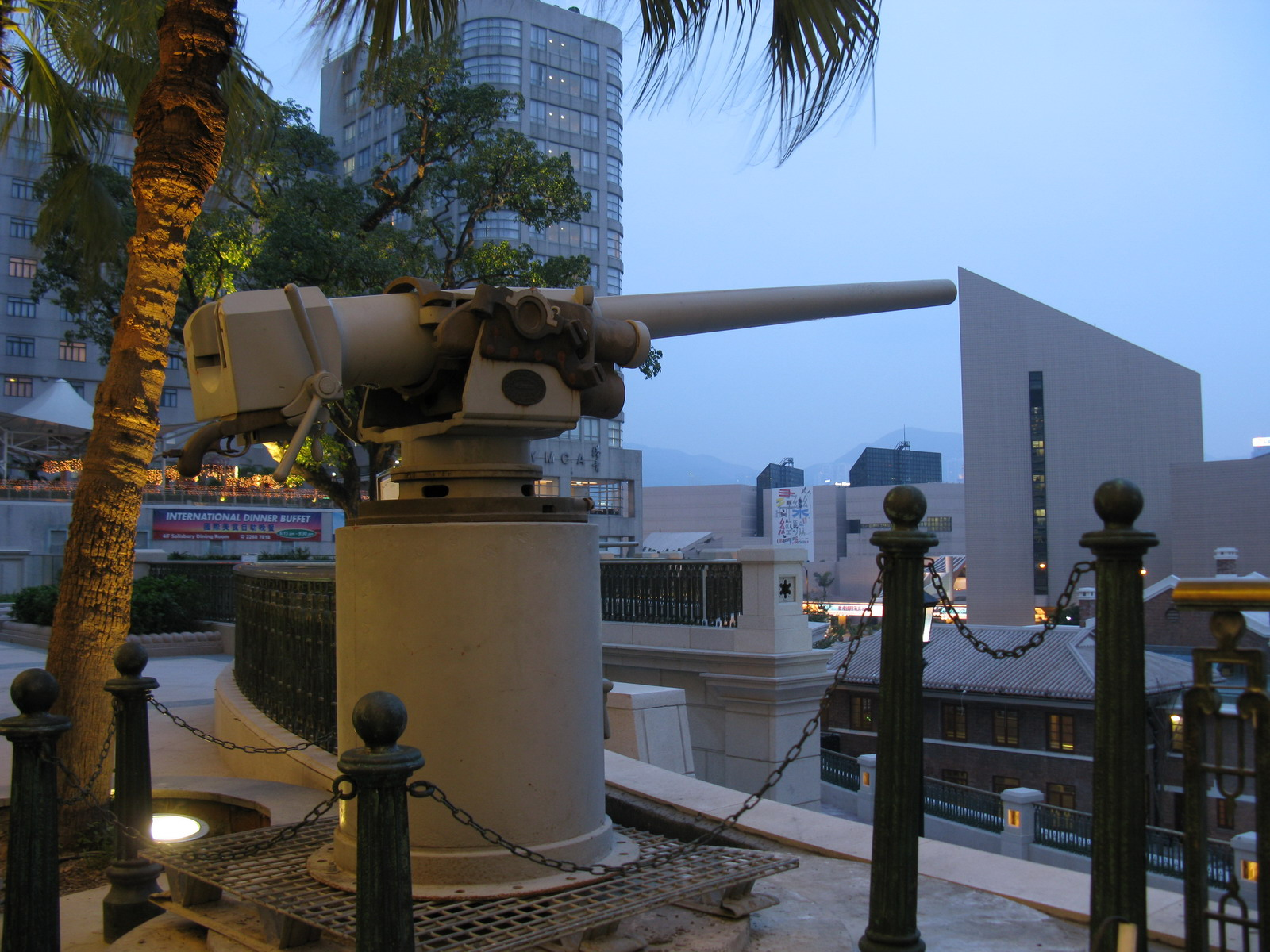
Artillery battery at Former Marine Police Headquarters Compound

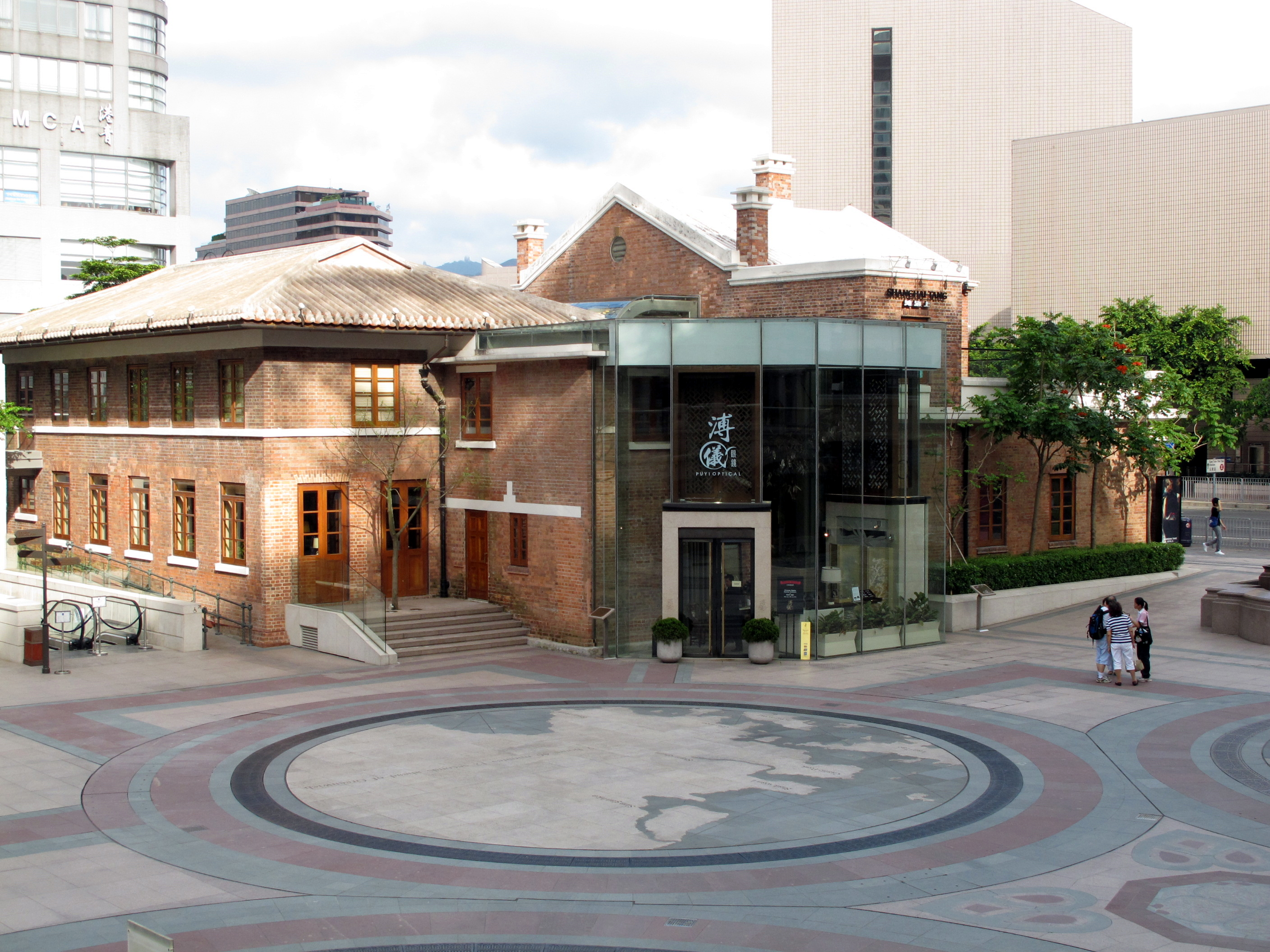
Old Kowloon Fire Station after renovation

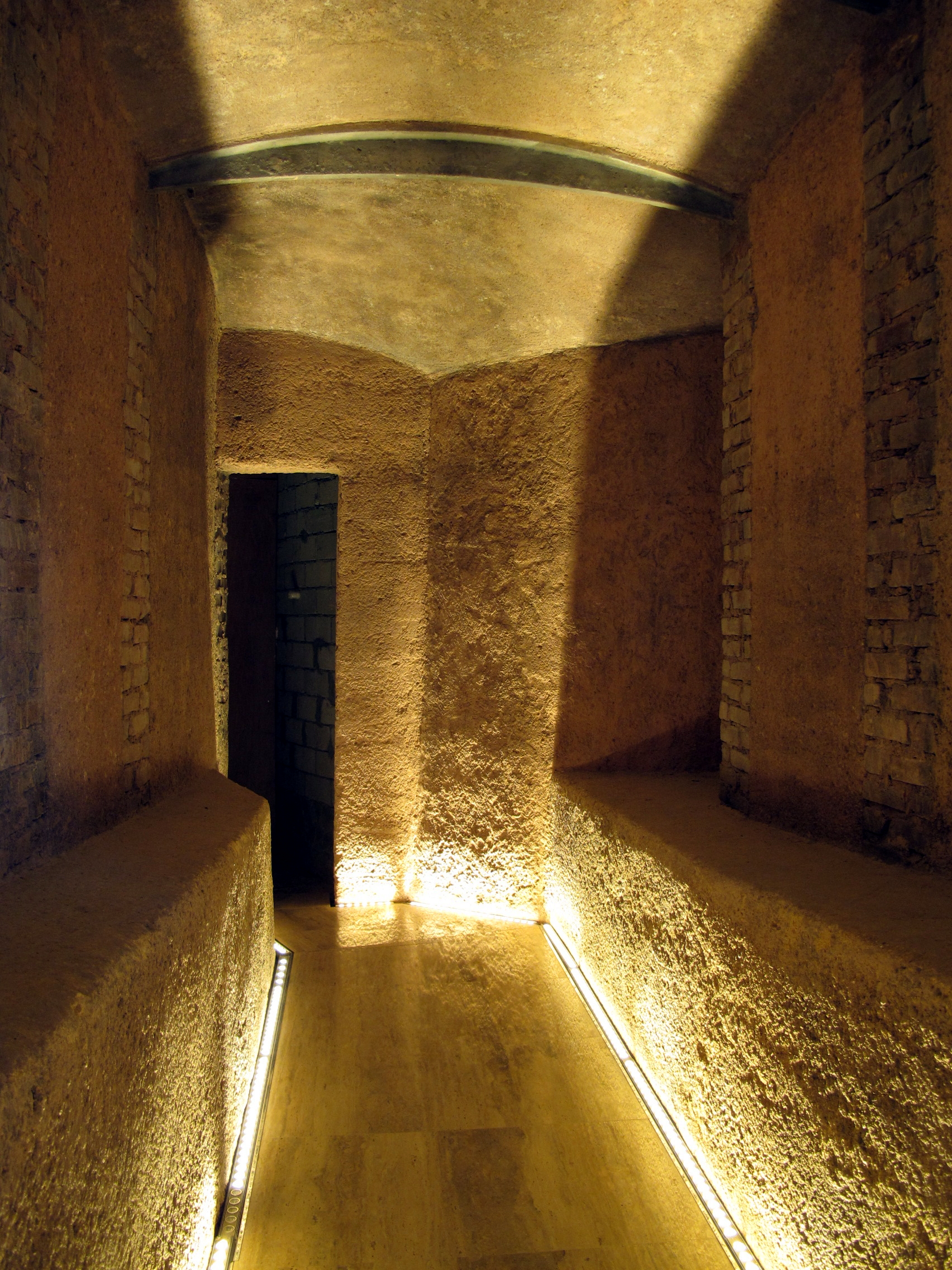
Shelter Tunnel

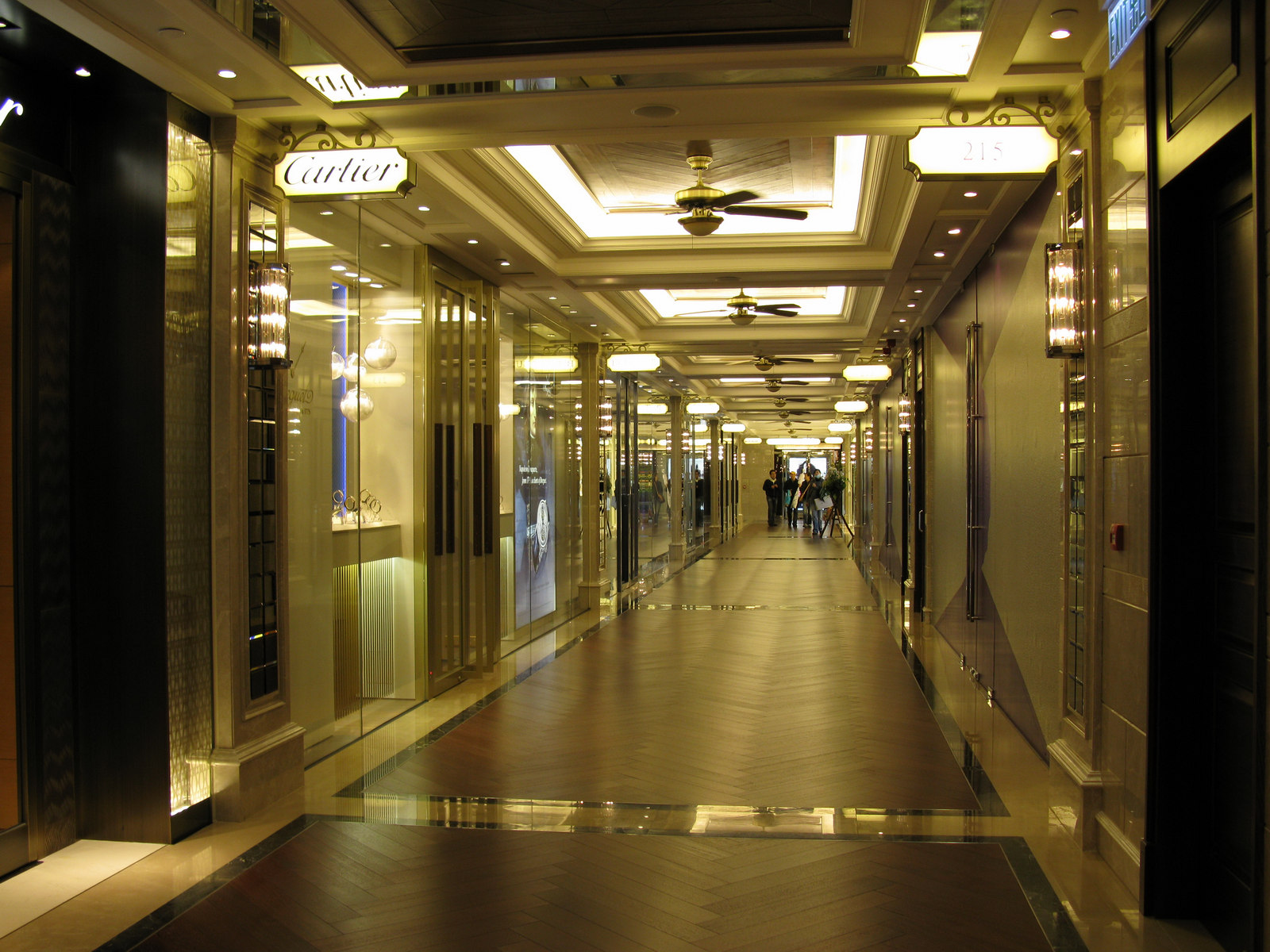
The shopping arcade

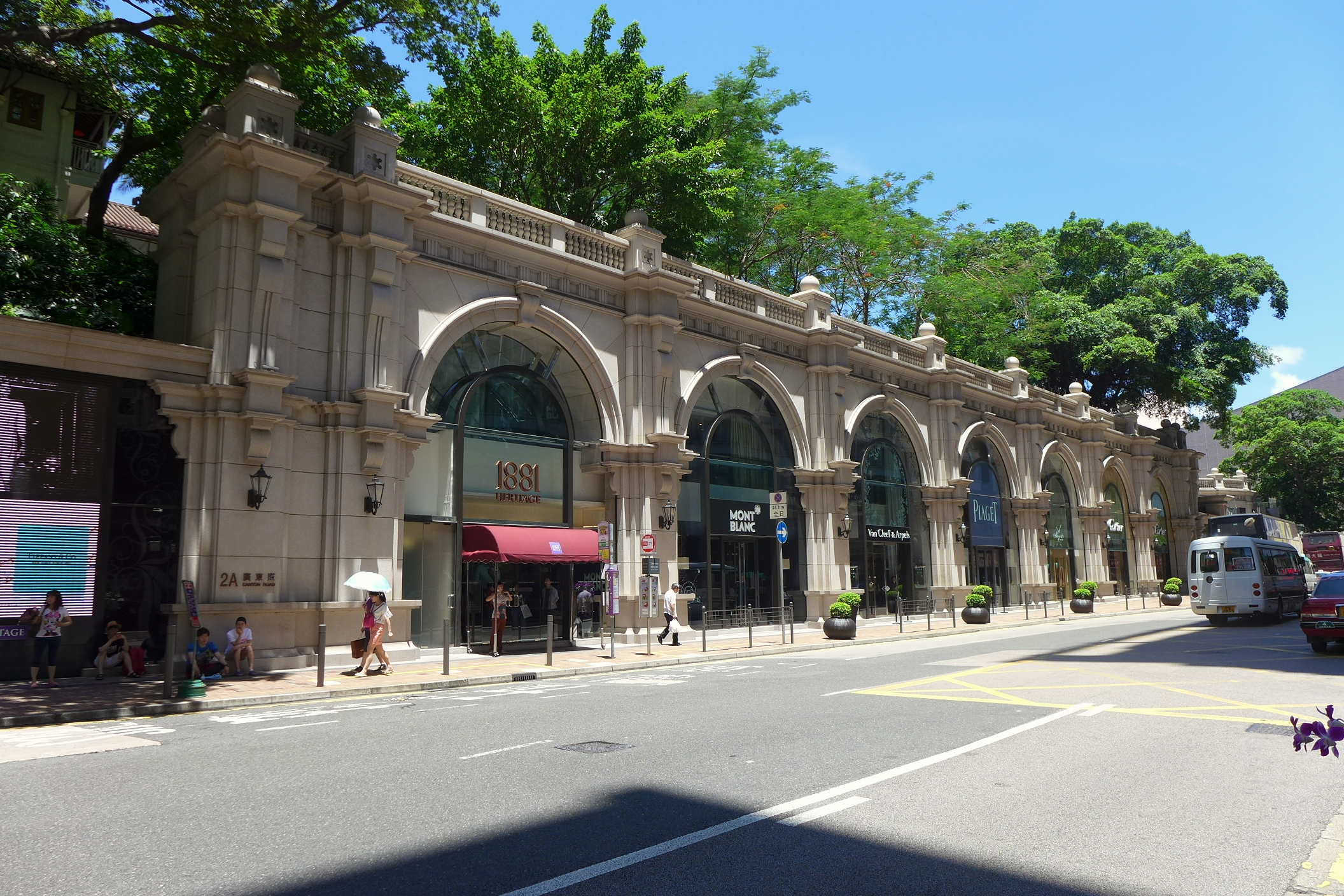
The shopping arcade viewed from Canton Road

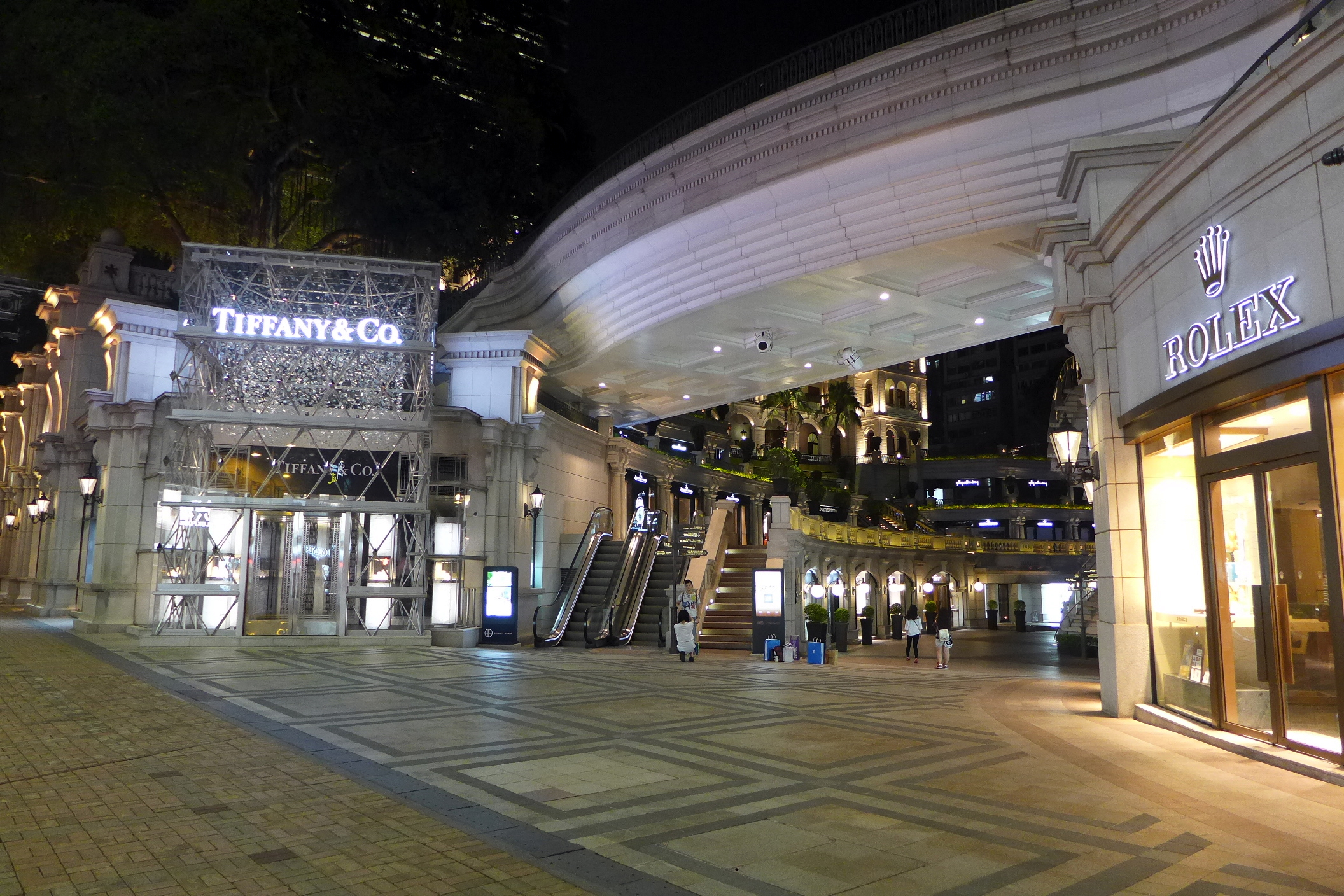
Partial view of the courtyard of the Former Marine Police Headquarters Compound.

== See also ==
- Adaptive reuse
- Revitalising Historic Buildings Through Partnership Scheme
- Historic police buildings in Hong Kong
