= Yung Shue Long =

Coordinates: 22.226981°N 114.114708°E

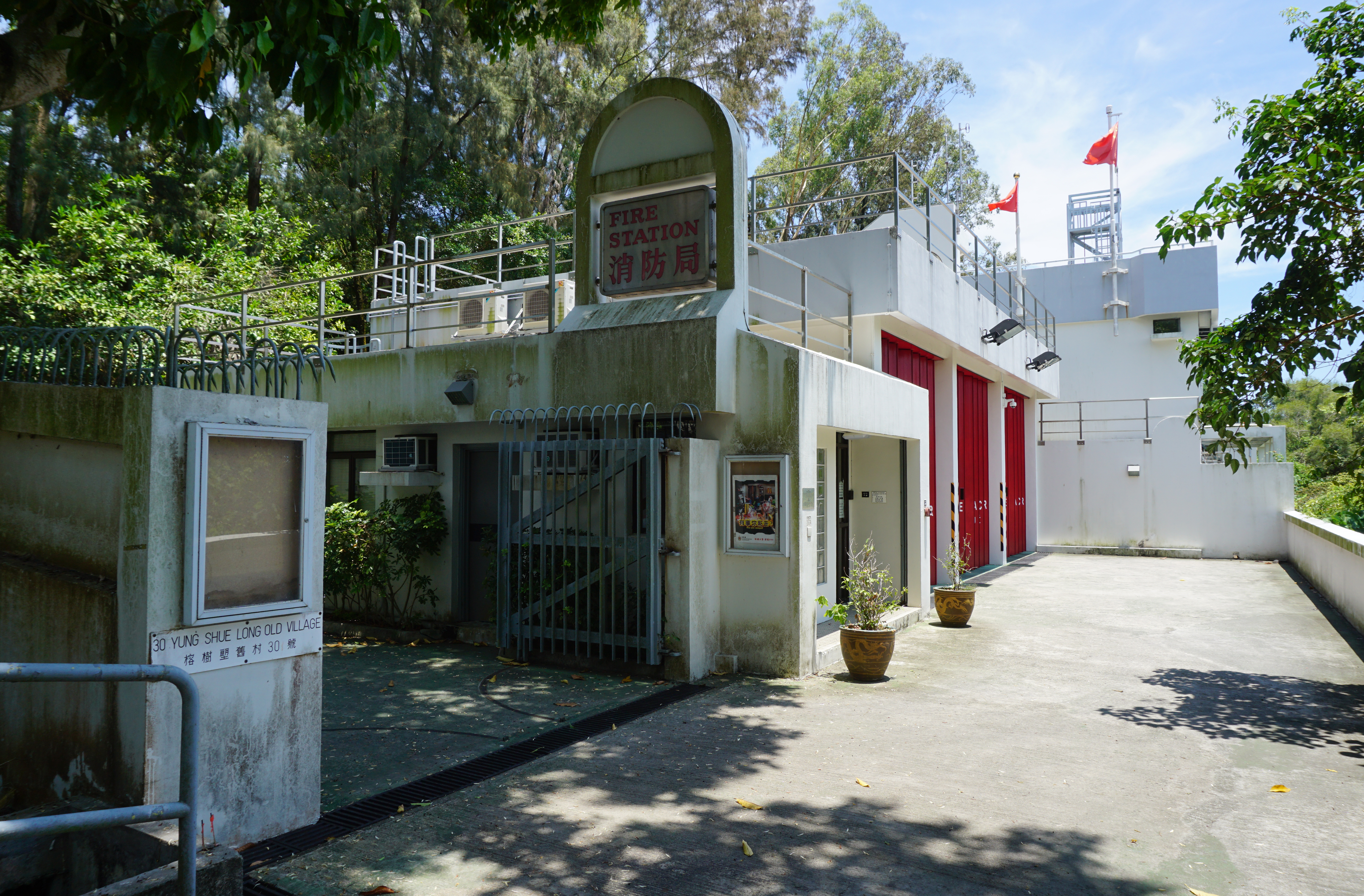
Lamma Fire Station in Yung Shue Long Old Village.

Yung Shue Long (Chinese: 榕樹塱) is a village located in the area of Yung Shue Wan on the North side of Lamma Island, the third largest island in the territory of Hong Kong.

== Administration ==
Yung Shue Long is a recognized village under the New Territories Small House Policy.
