= Canton Road =

Road in Kowloon, Hong Kong

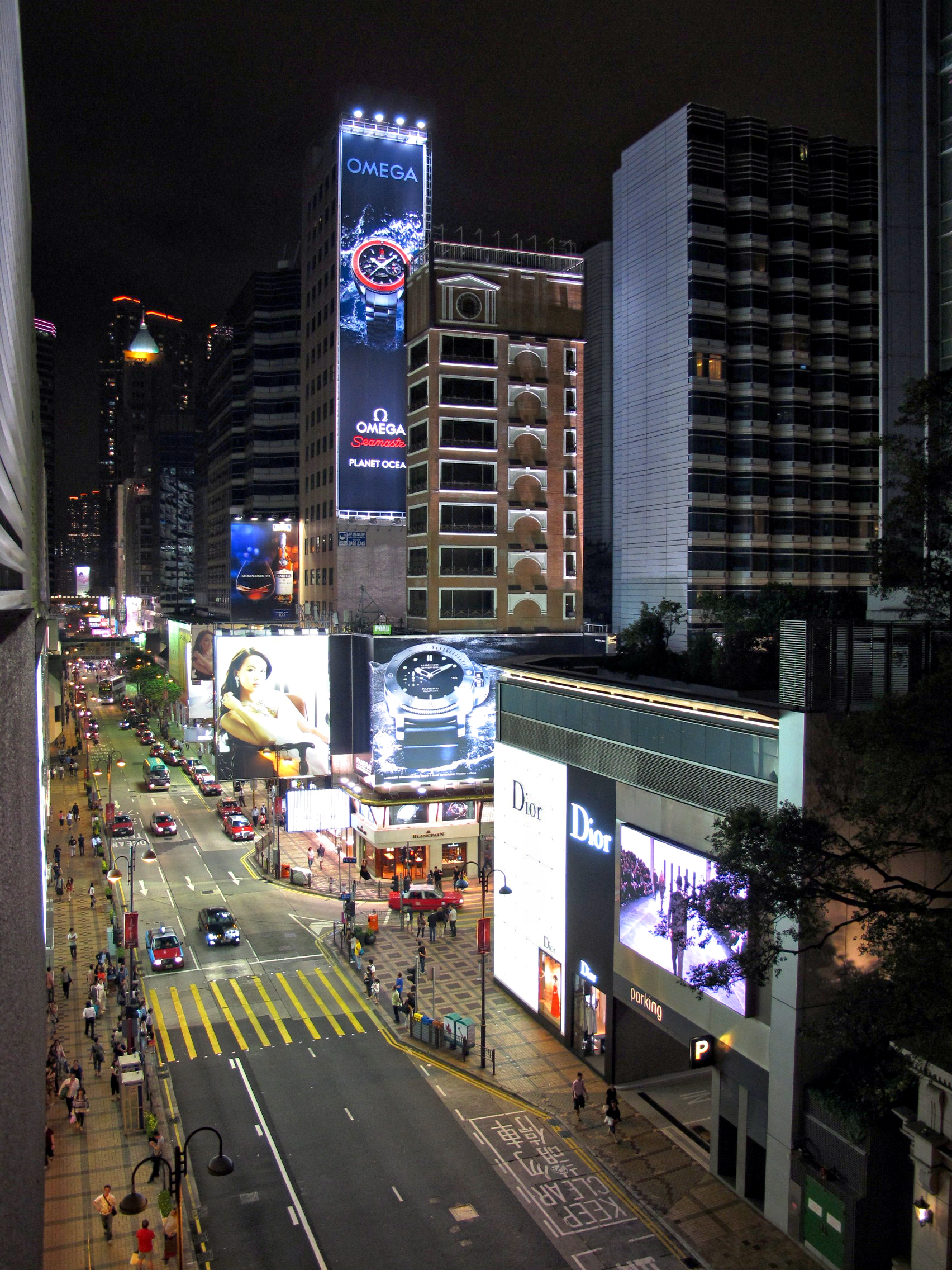
- Harbour City (left side of the road) in the Tsim Sha Tsui section in May 2012.
- Interactive map of Canton Road
- Native name: 廣東道 (Yue Chinese)
- Former name: MacDonnell Road
- Namesake: Guangzhou
- Location: Kowloon, Hong Kong
- Coordinates: 22°19′03″N 114°10′03″E
- South end: Salisbury Road
- North end: Lai Chi Kok Road

Canton Road (Chinese: 廣東道; Jyutping: gwong2 dung1 dou6) is a major road in Hong Kong, linking the former west reclamation shore in Tsim Sha Tsui, Jordan, Yau Ma Tei, Mong Kok and Prince Edward on the Kowloon Peninsula. The road runs mostly parallel and west to Nathan Road. It starts from the junction with Salisbury Road in the south and ends in the north at the junction with Lai Chi Kok Road in the Prince Edward area. The southern section of Canton Road is home to many upscale retail shops, shopping centres and others business establishments, with busy traffic from both vehicles and pedestrians from morning till late at night.

== Name ==
The road was originally named MacDonnell Road. It was renamed to Canton Road in 1909 to avoid confusion with MacDonnell Road on Hong Kong Island. The road is named after the City of Canton (also known as Guangzhou, 廣州), following a pattern where roads in the area were named after cities in China and Vietnam. However, an error resulted in Canton being interpreted as referring to the Province of Canton (Now Guangdong, 廣東), resulting in the Chinese name of the road becoming 廣東道 instead of the intended 廣州道.

== Sections and features ==
Canton Road is not one continuous road, instead, it is divided into four sections, interrupted by a major housing estate (Prosperous Garden) and disjointed by a traffic intersection (Jordan Road) as the result of urban development in the past hundred years. The following list follows a south-north order. (W) indicates the western side of the road, while (E) indicates the eastern side.

=== Tsim Sha Tsui section ===
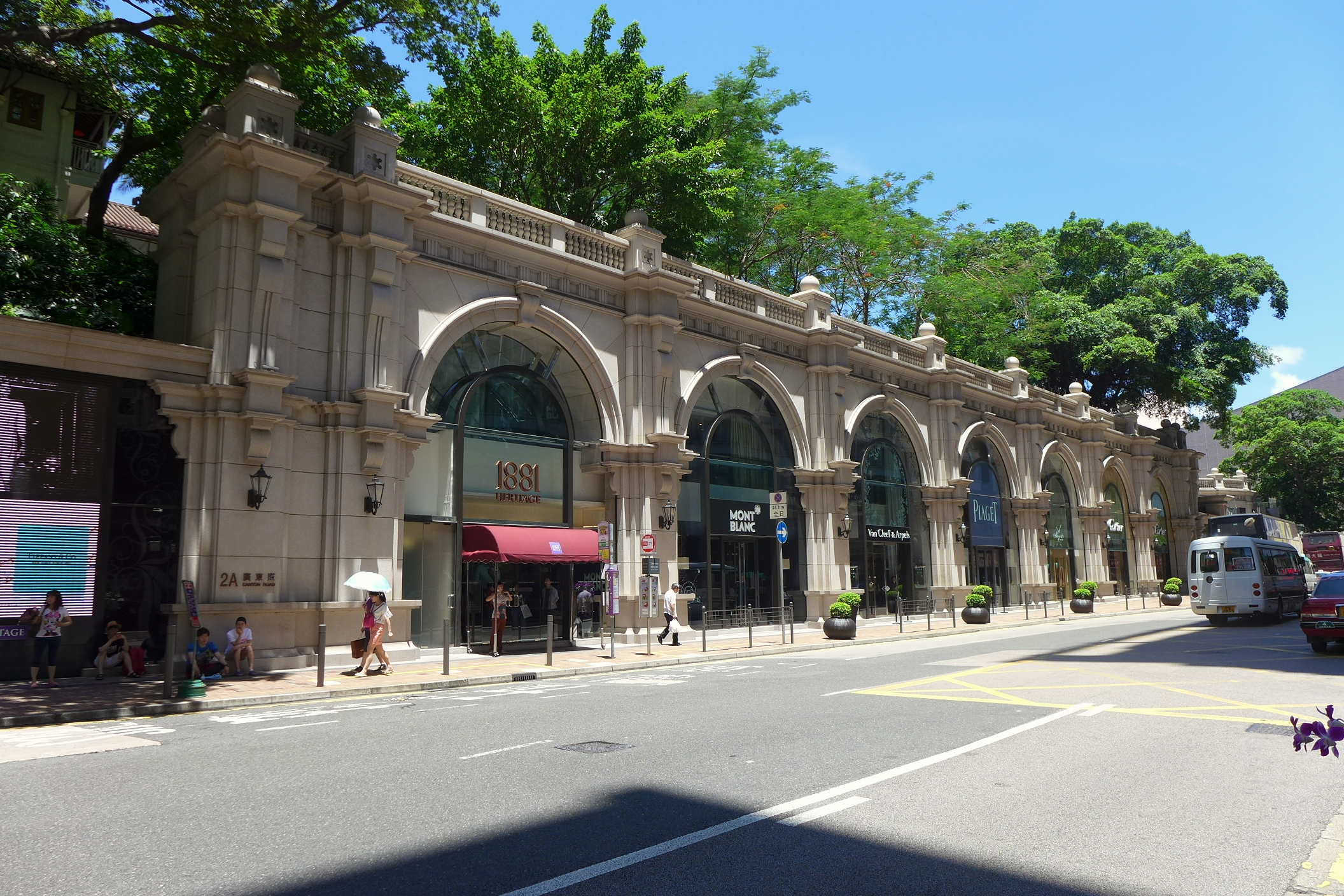
Southern end of Canton Road, along the 1881 Heritage in June 2015

The section starts at Salisbury Road and ends at Jordan Road. Features include:

- (W) Star House, at the intersection with Salisbury Road and facing the Tsim Sha Tsui Ferry Pier Bus Terminus
- (E) Former Marine Police Headquarters Compound, at the intersection with Salisbury Road. A declared monument, it has been renamed "1881 Heritage" and re-developed into a shopping mall and hotel.
- (W) Harbour City, which contains the Marco Polo Hong Kong Hotel, the Ocean Terminal, the Ocean Centre and The Gateway
- (E) One Peking office and shopping mall tower, at the junction with Peking Road
- (E) junction with Peking Road
- (E) Silvercord (新港中心) and the Silvercord Arcade (No. 30), at the junction with Haiphong Road
- (E) junction with Haiphong Road
- (E) junction with Kowloon Park Drive
- (W) China Hong Kong City, which contains the Hong Kong China Ferry Terminal
- (E) A small portion of Kowloon Park
- (E) Lai Chack Middle School (No. 180)
- (W) Tsim Sha Tsui Fire Station (No. 333)
- (E) Victoria Towers (No. 188), at the junction with Austin Road
- (E) junction with Austin Road
- (W) Exit F of Austin MTR station
- (W) Canton Road Government Offices (廣東道政府合署) (No. 393). It was one of the oldest remaining government office buildings at the time of its demolition in 2011.
- (E) junction with Bowring Street
- (W) junction with Wui Cheung Road
- (E) King George V Memorial Park, Kowloon at the intersection with Jordan Road

=== Jordan to Yau Ma Tei section ===
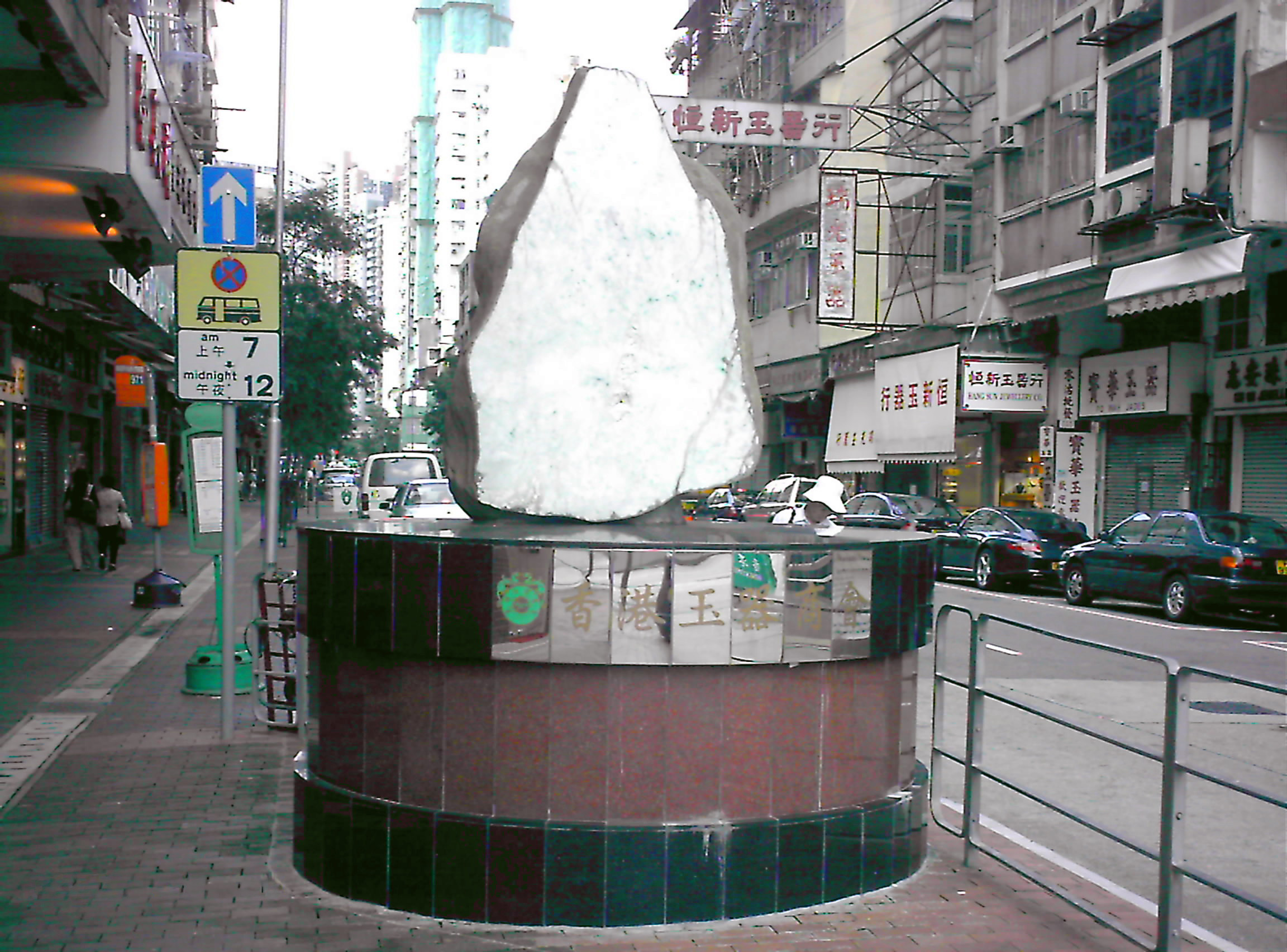
Jade monument in Canton Road, near the intersection with Jordan Road in August 2009.

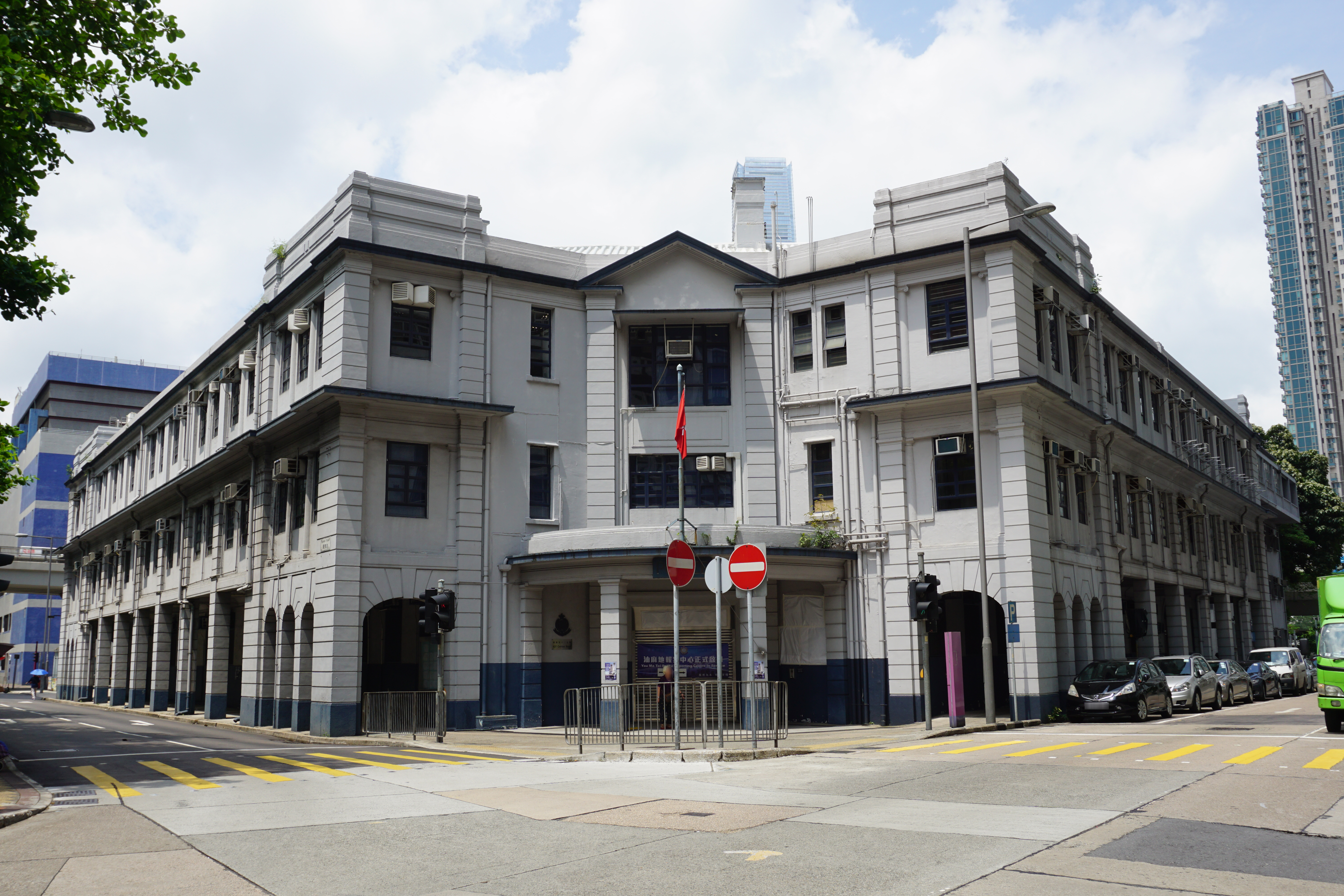
Yau Ma Tei Police Station, at the intersection of Canton Road and Public Square Street in May 2016.

The section starts at Jordan Road and ends at Public Square Street. The part of this section between Jordan Road and Kansu Street is sometimes called "Jade Street" because of the number of jewellery shops selling jade.

- (W) Giant jade stone near the intersection with Jordan Road (north side)
- (E) > junction with Nanking Street
- (E) > junction with Ning Po Street
- > intersection with Saigon Street
- (E) No. 578 Canton Road, a building proposed for conservation, at the intersection with Saigon Street
- (E) > junction with Pak Hoi Street
- > intersection with Kansu Street
- (W) Yau Ma Tei Police Station, a Grade III historic building, at the intersection with Public Square Street

The road is interrupted north of Public Square Street, and Prosperous Garden, a housing estate, is located in its place. The Broadway Cinematheque is located within Prosperous Garden.

=== Yau Ma Tei section ===
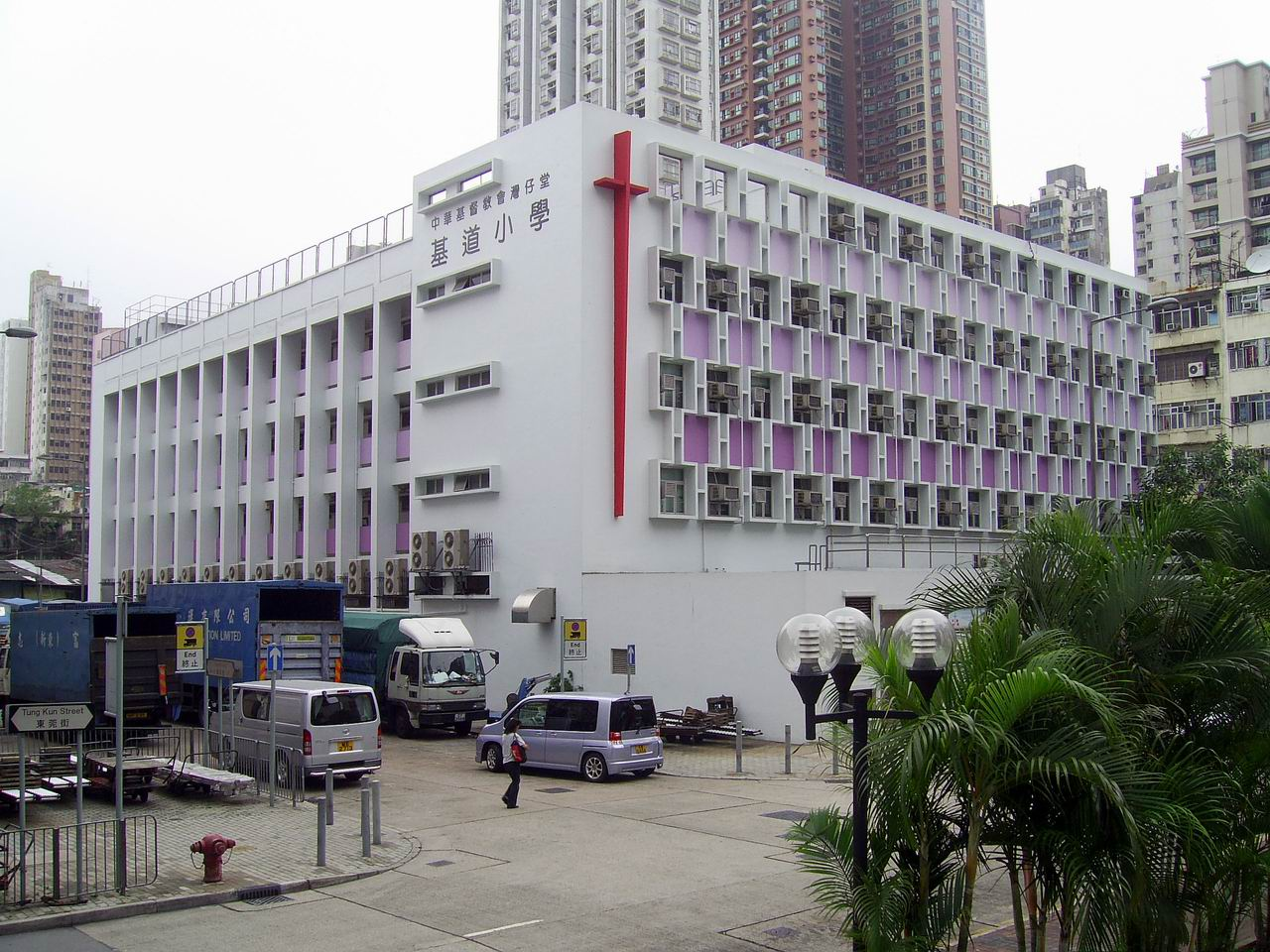
Yau Ma Tei section in April 2008: a primary school occupies the whole eastern side of this section. The vehicles are within Canton Road.

This very short section (about 30m long) starts at Tung Kun Street, north of Prosperous Garden and ends at the Yau Ma Tei Fruit Market, a Grade III historic building. This section is bordered by two schools:

- (W) Tung Koon District Society Fong Shu Chuen School
- (E) Wanchai Church Kei To School

=== Yau Ma Tei to Prince Edward section ===
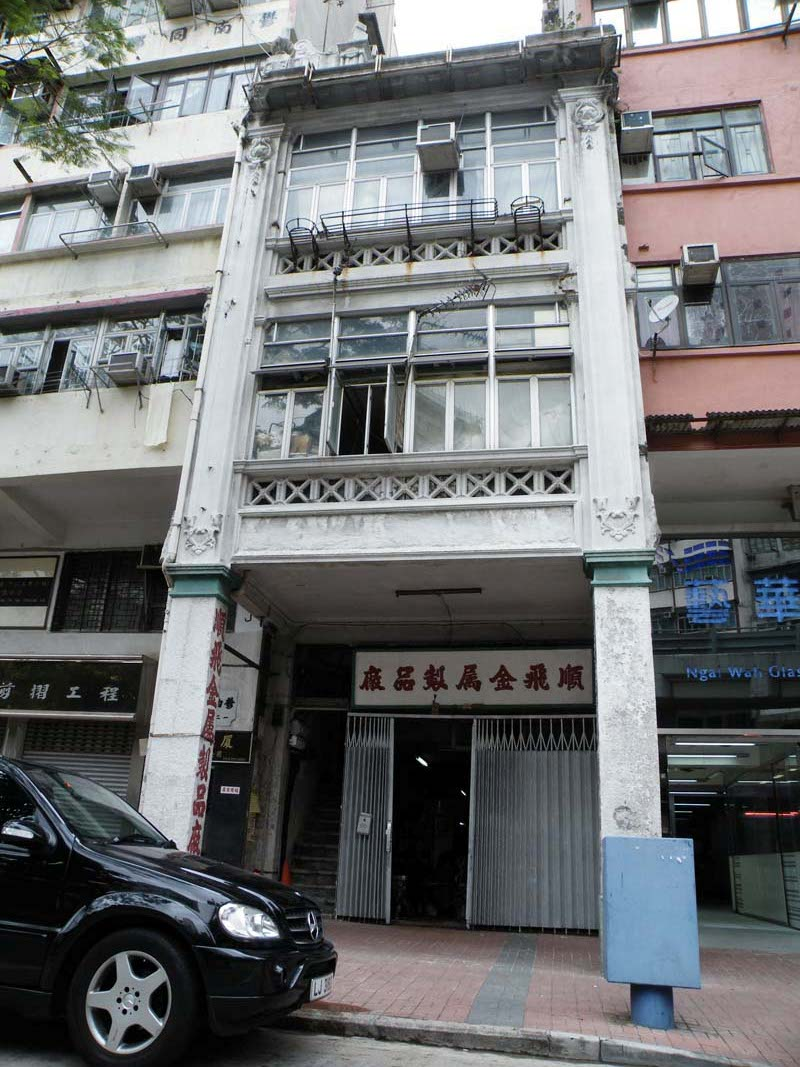
No. 1235 Canton Road in July 2010.

The section starts at Waterloo Road, north of the Yau Ma Tei Fruit Market and ends at Lai Chi Kok Road. This section features a street market in the Mong Kok area.

- > intersection with Pitt Street
- (E) > junction with Hamilton Street
- > intersection with Dundas Street
- > intersection with Soy Street
- > intersection with Shantung Street
- > intersection with Nelson Street
- (W) > junction with Nam Tau Street
- (W) Mongkok Market Complex between the junctions with Nam Tau Street and Argyle Street
- > intersection with Argyle Street
- (W) China Cafe (No. 1077A), a cha chaan teng featured in several Hong Kong films, including the 2001 Fulltime Killer, the 2003 PTU, the 2005 Election and the 2007 Whispers and Moans.
- (E) > junction with Fife Street
- > intersection with Mong Kok Road
- > intersection with Bute Street
- > intersection with Arran Street
- > intersection with Prince Edward Road West
- (W) No. 1235 Canton Road, tong-lau proposed for conservation

== West Rail line (Tuen Ma Line) ==
It was proposed that a station, Canton Road on the Kowloon Southern Link of the West Rail line, could be built beneath the Tsim Sha Tsui section of the road, outside Harbour City. The plan was put off after unsuccessful negotiation between KCRC and The Wharf on financial arrangement. Another station, Austin, near the junction of Canton Road and Wui Cheung Road in Kwun Chung opened on 16 August 2009.

== In popular culture ==
The final shootout sequence of the 2003 film PTU, directed by Johnnie To, takes place in Canton Road. The sequence was actually shot in Ap Lei Chau.

== Gallery ==
=== Tsim Sha Tsui section ===
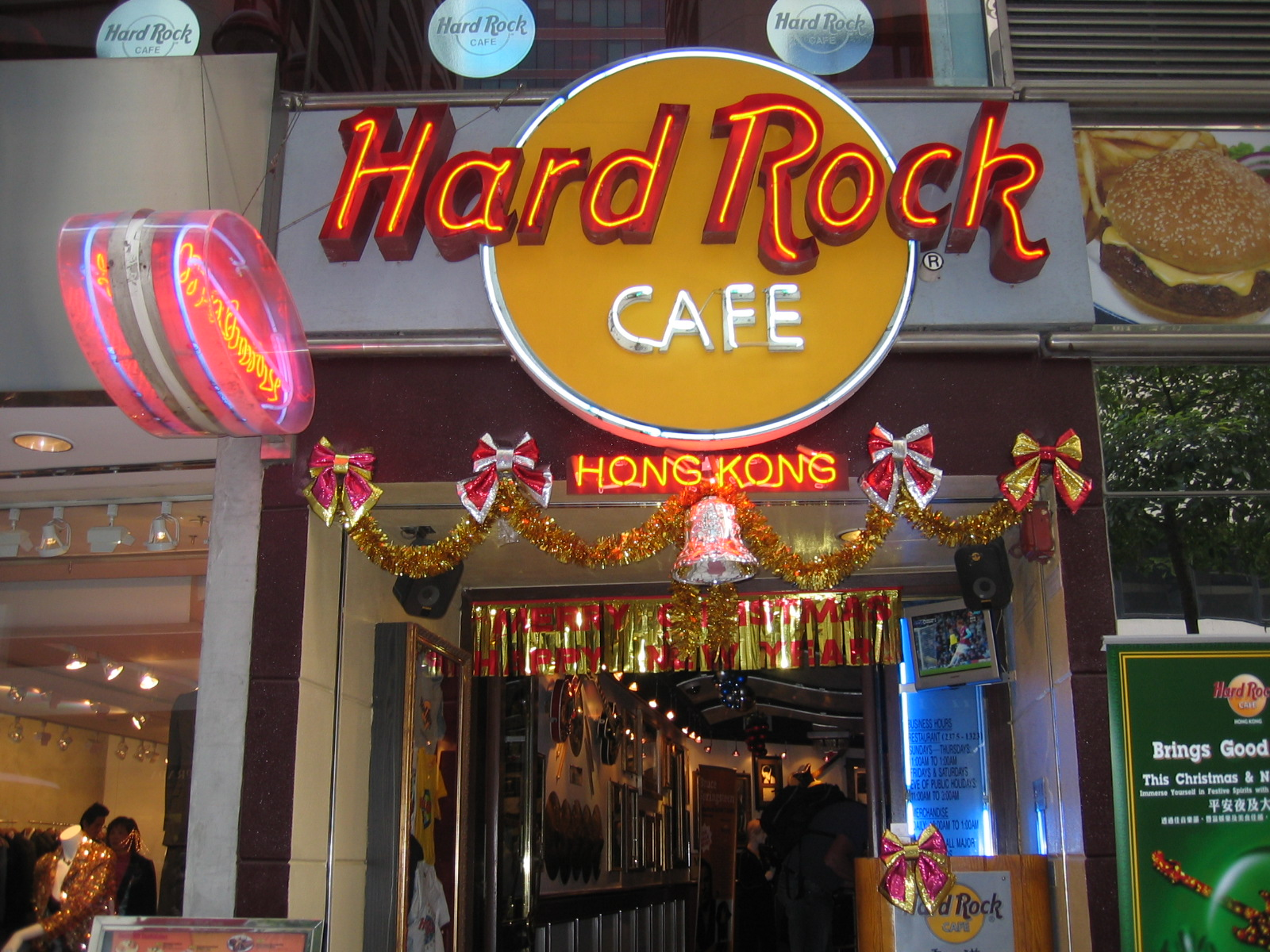
Hard Rock Cafe, G/F & 1/F, Silvercord in December 2005 (closed since 24 November 2008)

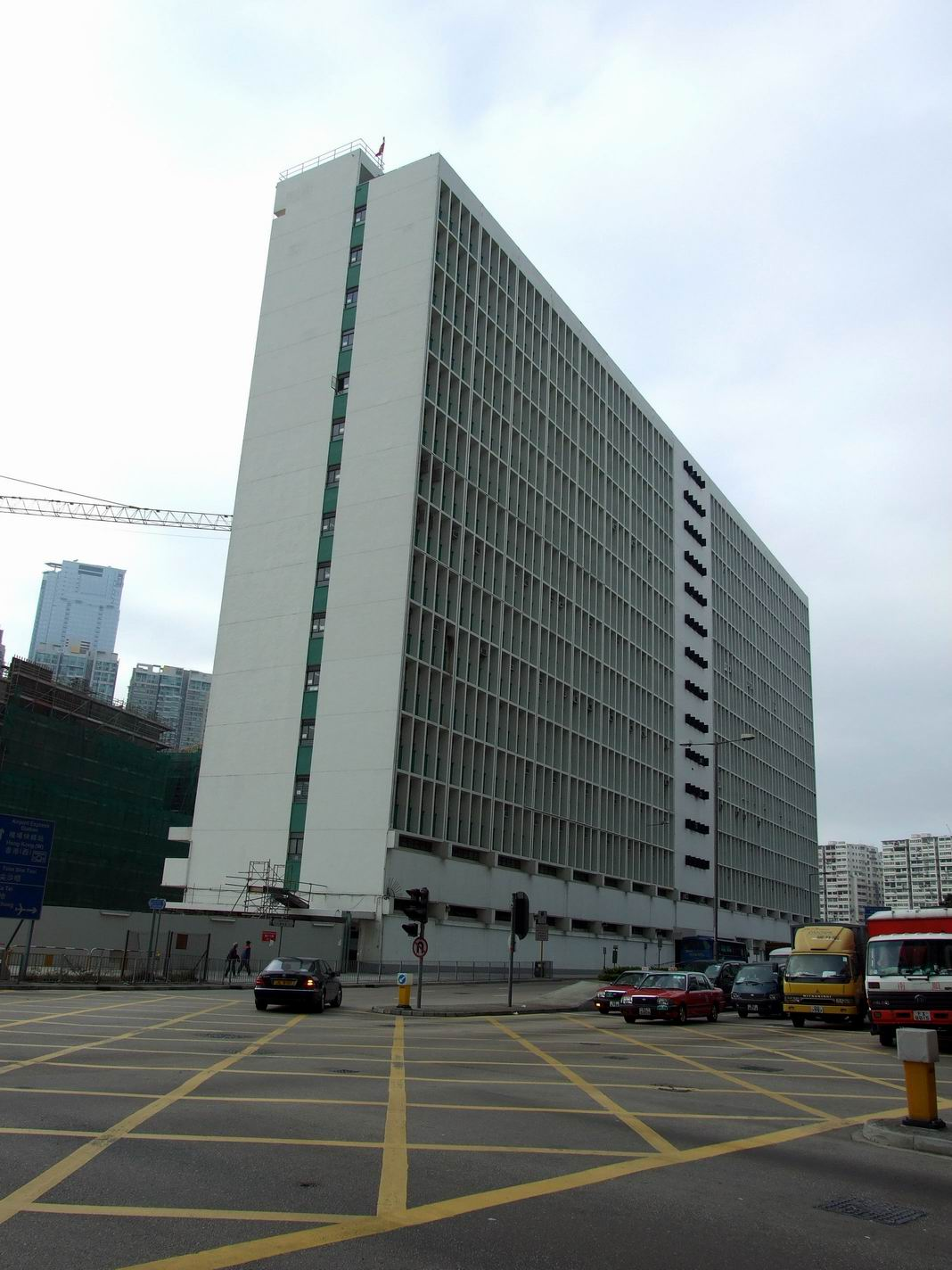
Canton Road Government Offices in January 2008, demolished in 2011

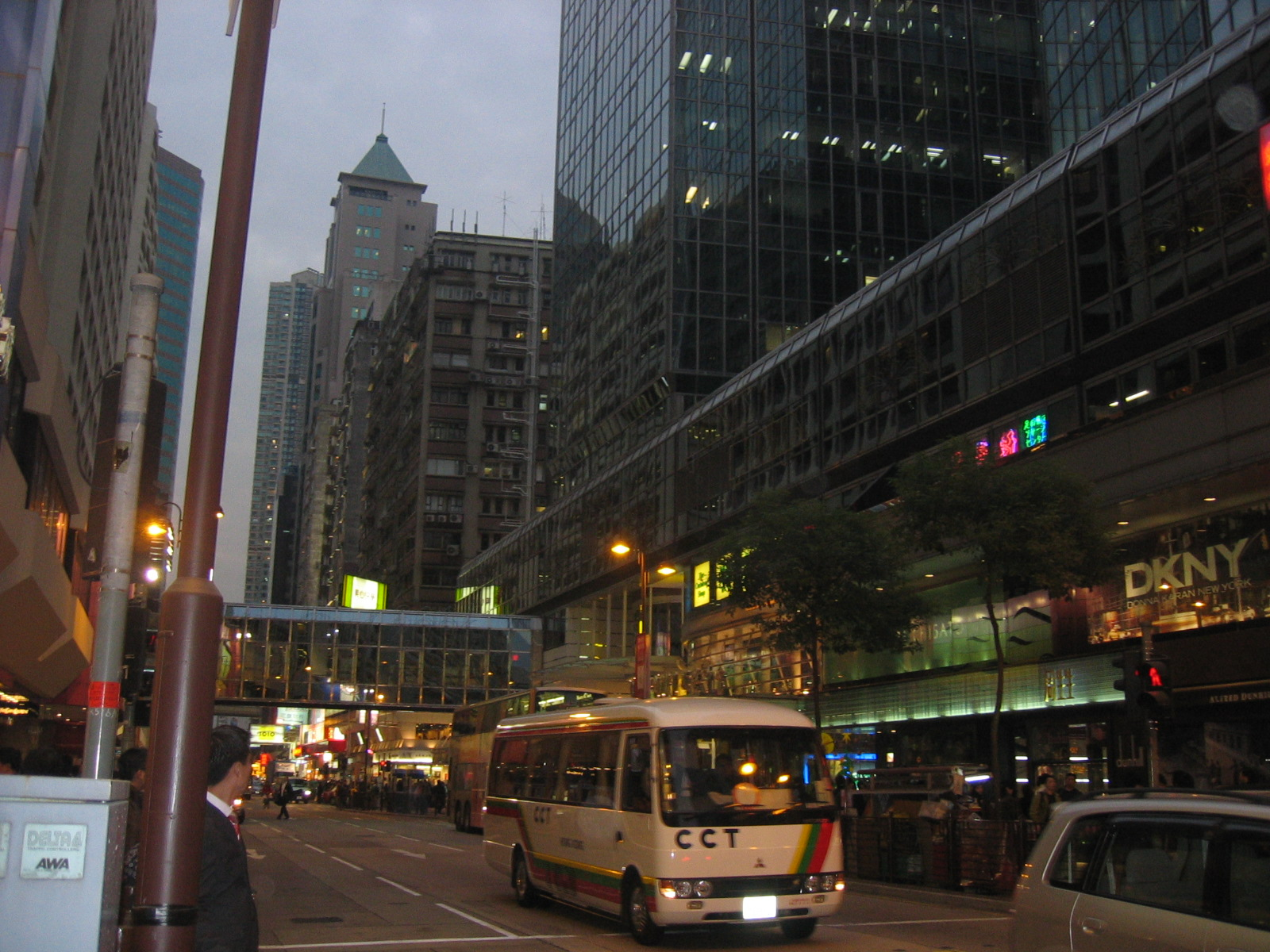
Canton Road near Silvercord in the evening, looking north in December 2005

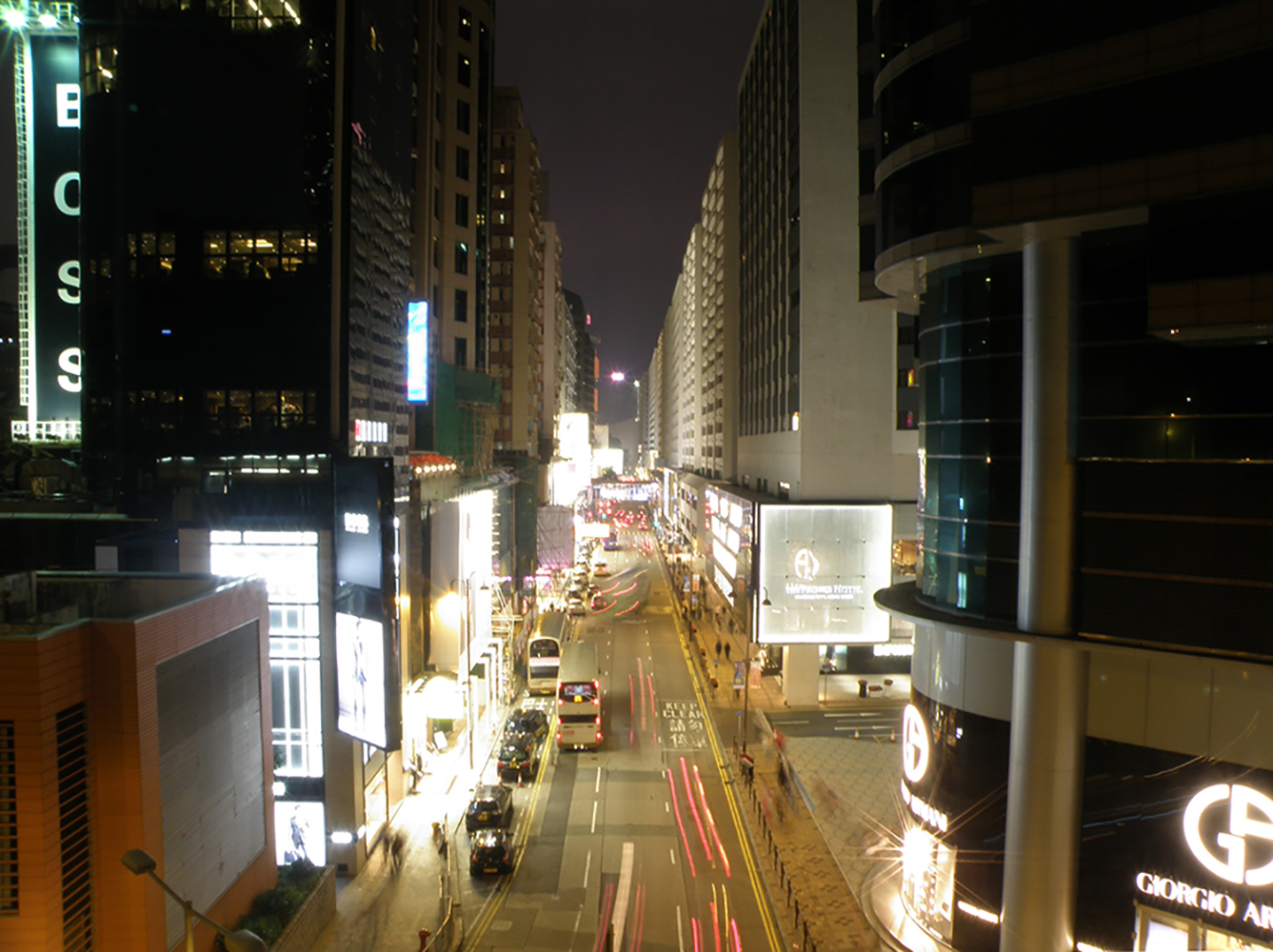
Canton Road along Harbour City at night, looking south in March 2015

== See also ==
- Shanghai Street, a 2.3 km long street, generally parallel to Canton Road and Nathan Road
- List of streets and roads in Hong Kong
