= Public Square Street =

Street in Yau Ma Tei, Hong Kong

Coordinates: 22°18′36.47″N 114°10′13.07″E

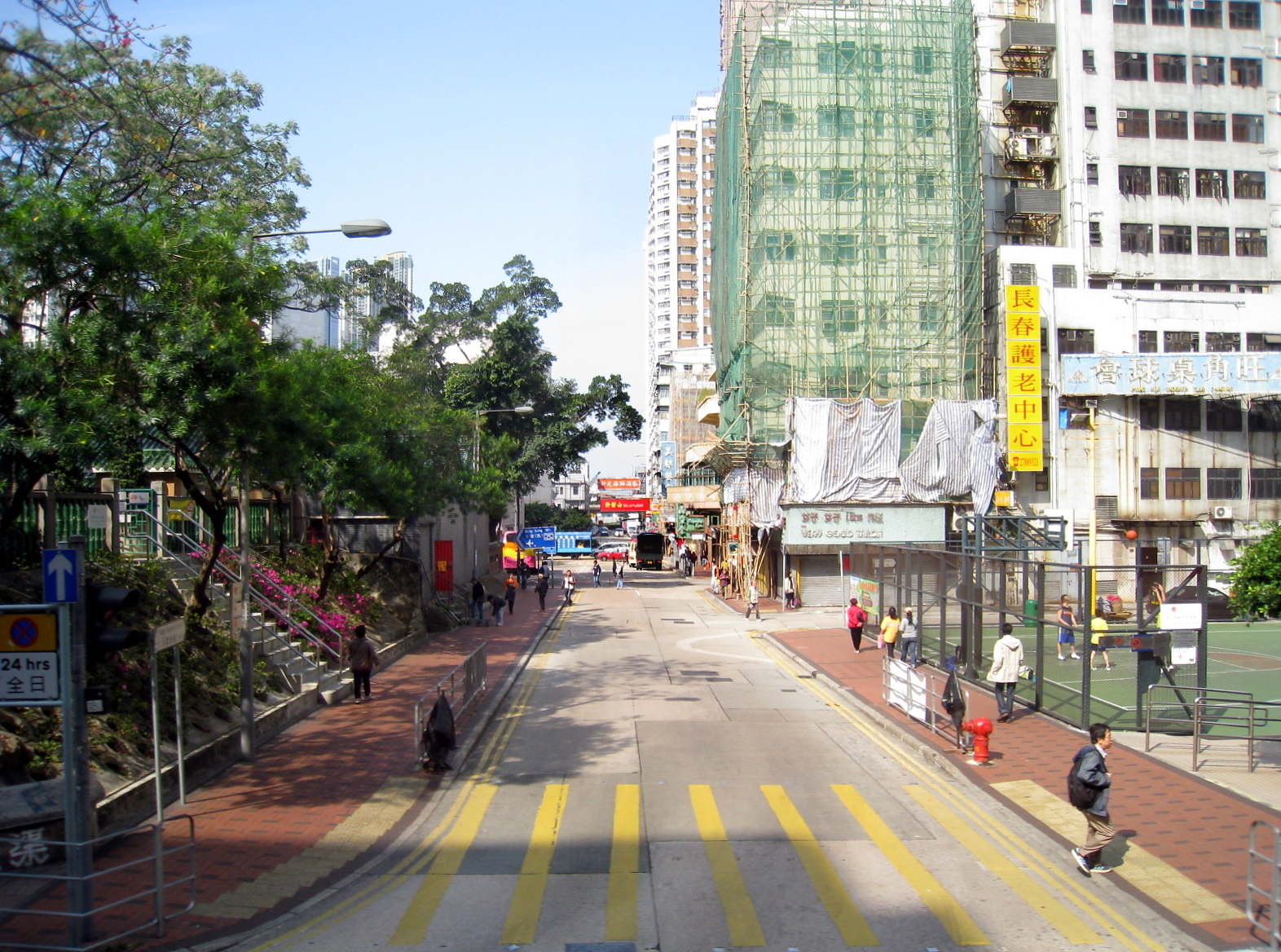
- Public Square Street, at its intersection with Nathan Road, looking west.
- Traditional Chinese: 眾坊街
- Simplified Chinese: 众坊街
Transcriptions
Standard Mandarin
- Hanyu Pinyin: Zhòngfāngjiē
Yue: Cantonese
- Yale Romanization: jung3 fong1 gaai1
- Jyutping: zung3 fong1 gaai1

Alternative Chinese name
- Traditional Chinese: 公眾四方街
- Simplified Chinese: 公众四方街
Transcriptions
Standard Mandarin
- Hanyu Pinyin: Gōngzhòng Sìfāng Jiē
Yue: Cantonese
- Jyutping: gung1 zung3 sei3 fong1 gaai1

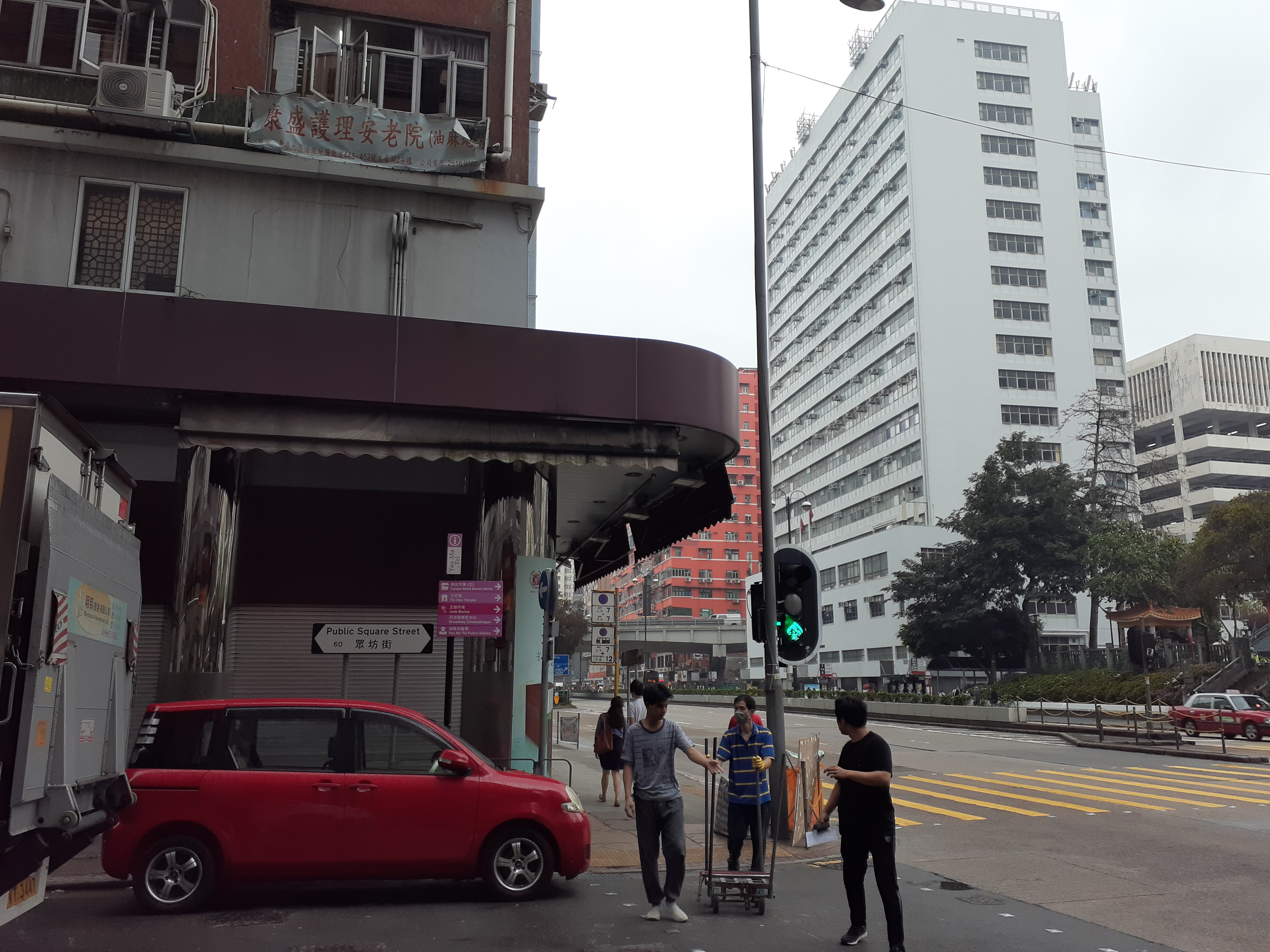
Corner of Public Square Street and Nathan Road, here in the section between Cliff Road and Nathan Road. The tall white building is Kowloon Government Offices (九龍政府合署).

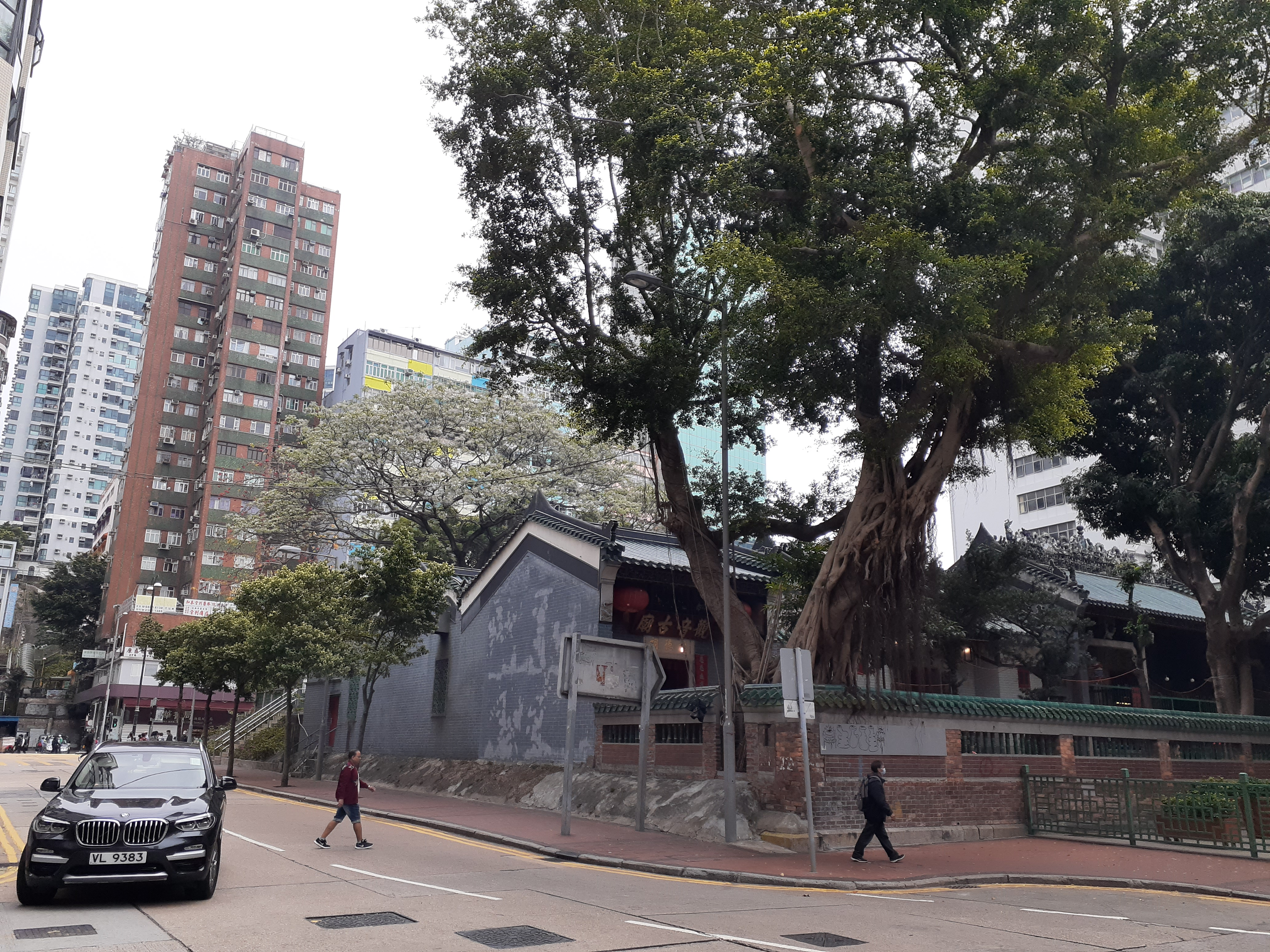
Tin Hau Temple Complex along Public Square Street.

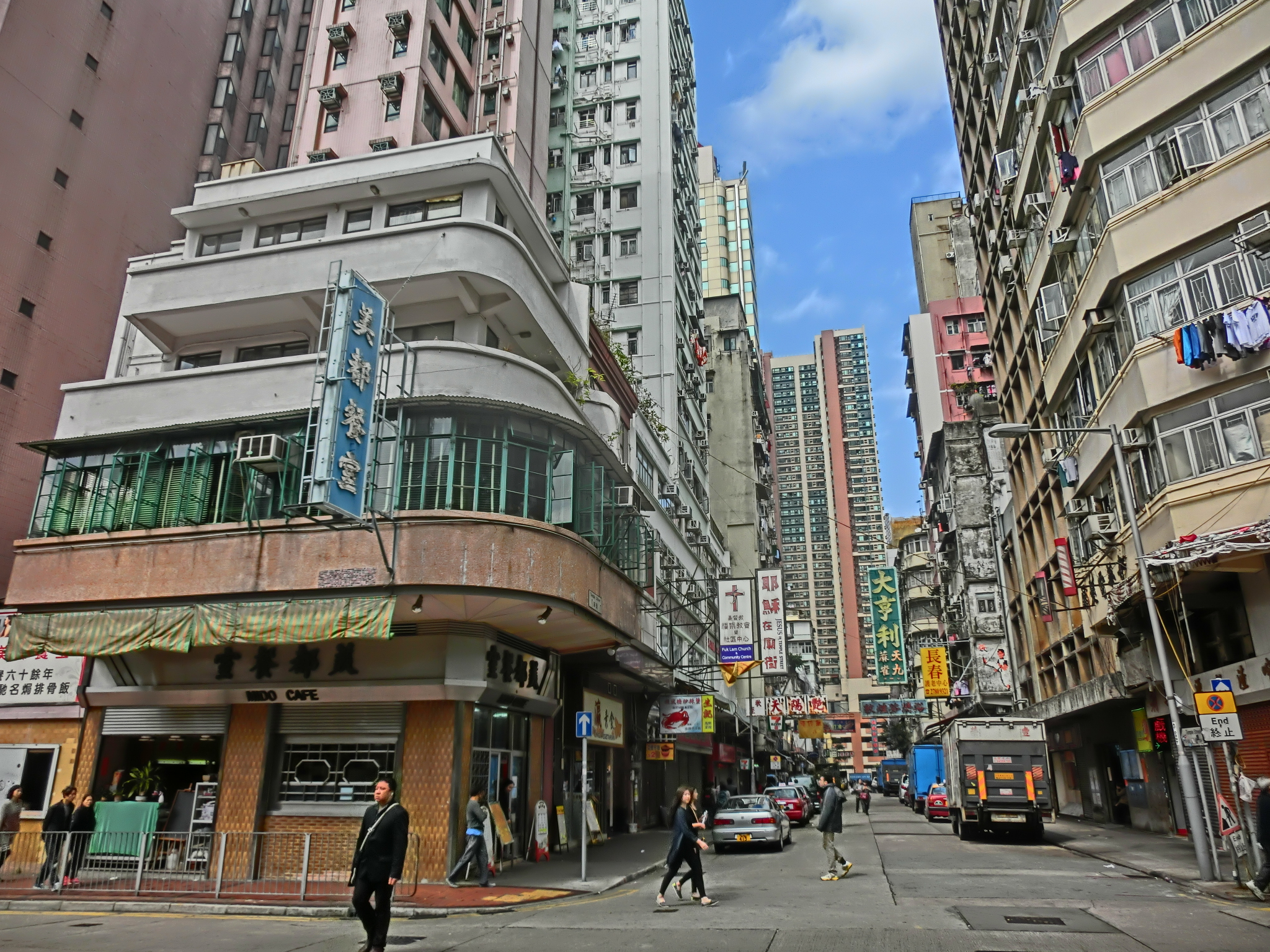
Mido Cafe (美都餐室) at the corner of Public Square Street and Temple Street. Looking north into Temple Street.

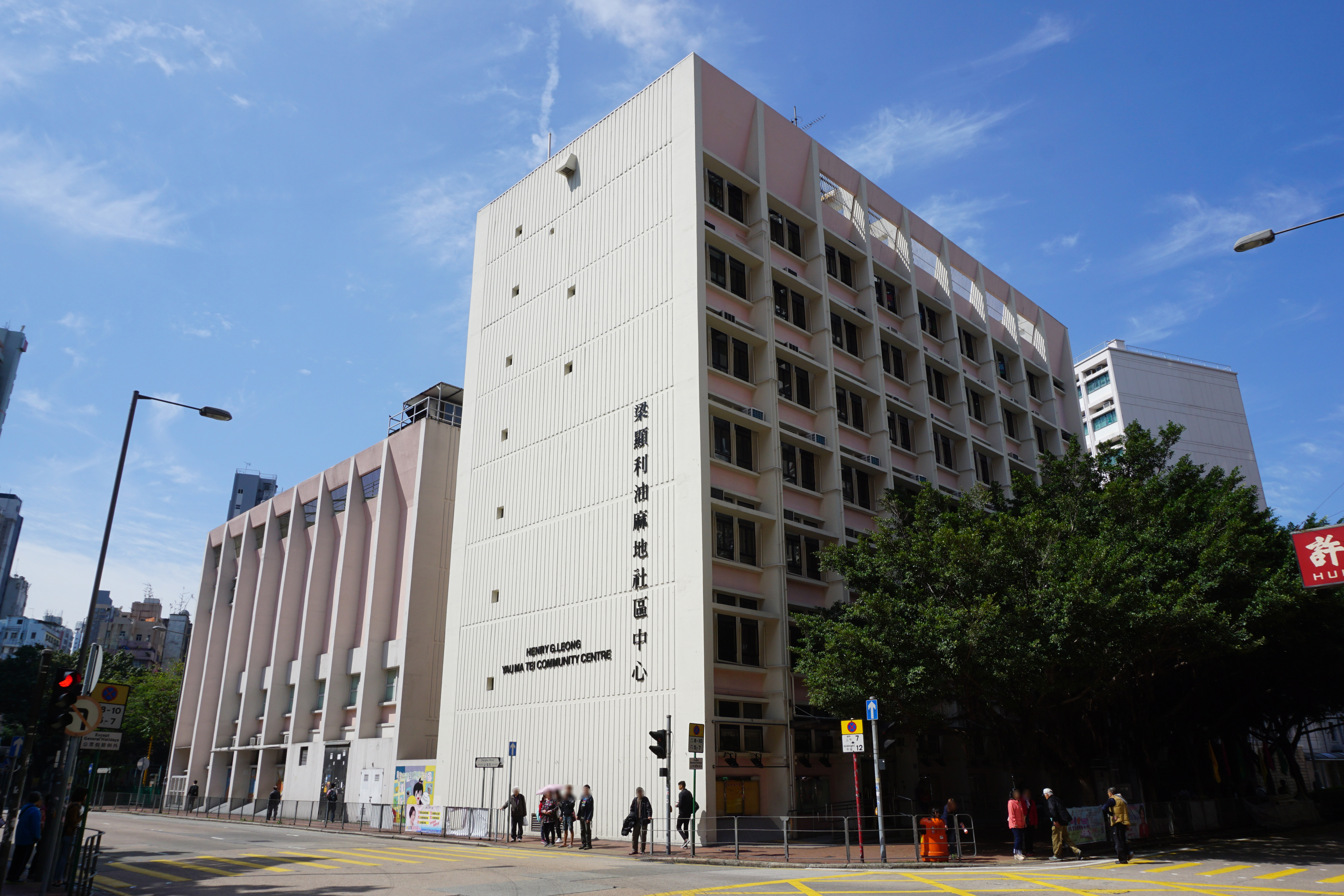
Henry G. Leong Yaumatei Community Centre (梁顯利油麻地社區中心) at the corner of Public Square Street and Shanghai Street.

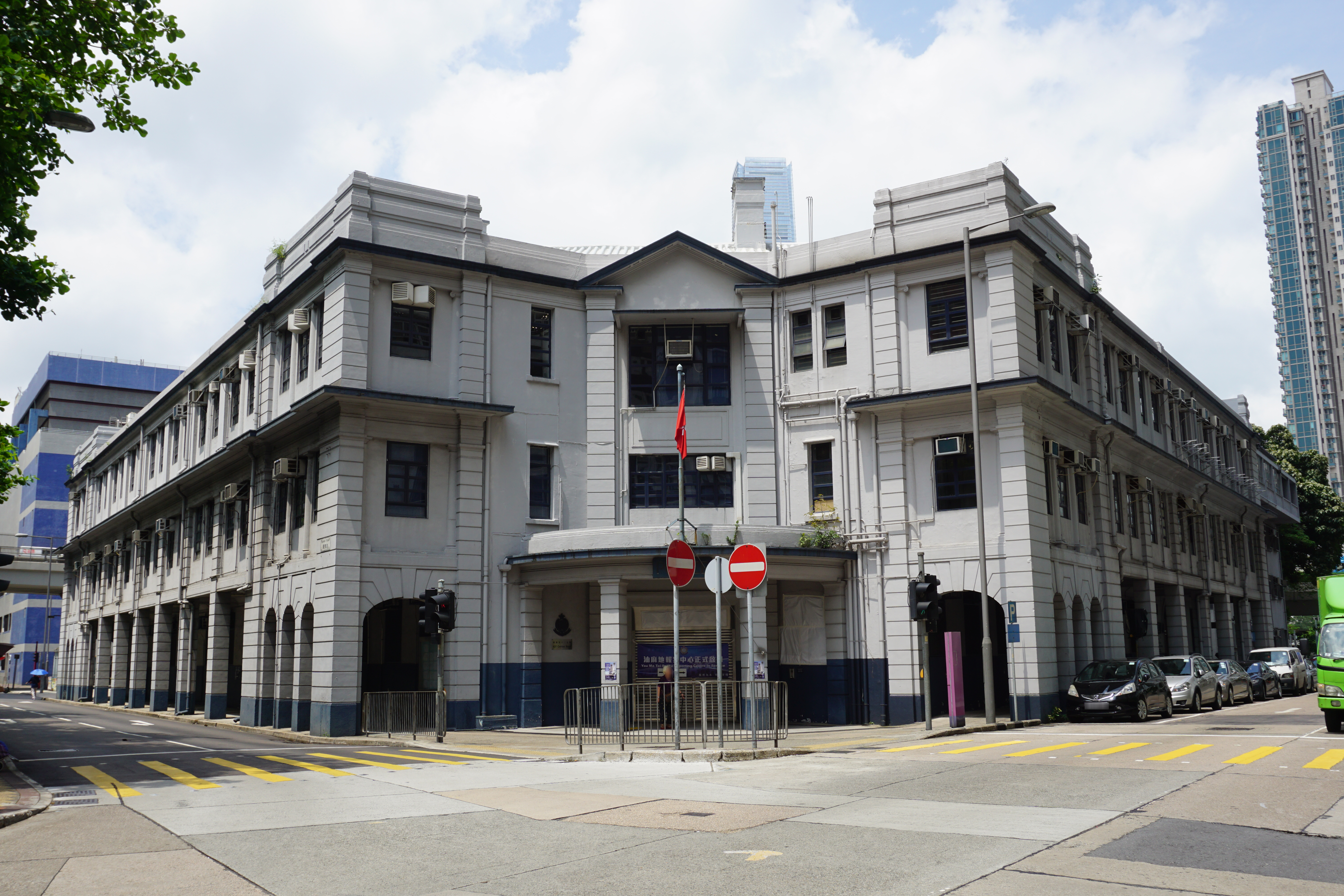
Yau Ma Tei Police Station at the corner of Public Square Street and Canton Road.

Public Square Street (Chinese: 眾坊街; Cantonese Yale: jung3 fong1 gaai1; formerly 公眾四方街) is a street in Yau Ma Tei, Kowloon, Hong Kong.

== Location ==
The street runs in an east-west alignment from Cliff Road to Ching Ping Street (澄平街), meeting Nathan Road, Temple Street, Shanghai Street, Reclamation Street and Canton Road in its course.

== History ==
The street was built in 1887. Its original name in Chinese was 公眾四方街 (Kung Chong Sze Fong Kai in Cantonese), a mistranslation that resulted from the word square being misinterpreted as a geometric shape. The more accurate translation of 眾坊街 (Chung Fong Kai in Cantonese language) was adopted in 1976.

A large-scale reclamation was carried out in Yau Ma Tei between 1900 and 1904, between today's Reclamation Street and Ferry Street. Public Square Street was extended to Ferry Street accordingly.

The end of the street, near present-day Ferry Street, the Yau Ma Tei Ferry Pier was one of main pier for ferry transport across Victoria Harbour between Kowloon and Hong Kong Island. The ferry pier was completed in 1923. The pier was later relocated to Ferry Point near Kwun Chung.

The Tin Hau Temple Complex, a school and a community office were built in Public Square Street at the end of the 19th century by the leaders of the Yau Ma Ti Kaifong. In 1966, they all were still standing in a form similar to their original one.

== Features ==
The public square in the street's name refers to Yung Shue Tau (榕樹頭), a gathering place in front of the Tin Hau Temple in Yau Ma Tei. Apart from the landmarks of Yung Shue Tau and Tin Hau Temple, there are also the night market of Temple Street, historical Yau Ma Tei Police Station, and Broadway Cinematheque. Jade Market is just a few walks away. On the other side of Nathan Road, the end near Cliff Road has steps leading to the hill of King's Park.

Landmarks and adjoining roads, from East to West:

- > Junction with Cliff Road (石壁道). At the foot of King's Park hill
- > Junction with Nathan Road
- Public Square Street Rest Garden (眾坊街/甘肅街休憩花園)
- Arthur Street Temporary Playground (鴉打街臨時遊樂場)
- > Junction with Arthur Street (鴉打街)
- Tin Hau Temple Complex. A declared monuments.
- > Junction with Temple Street
- Mido Cafe. At the corner of Public Square Street and Temple Street (north side)
- Yau Ma Tei Community Centre Rest Garden at Yung Shue Tau
- > Junction with Shanghai Street
- Henry G. Leong Yaumatei Community Centre (梁顯利油麻地社區中心). At the corner of Public Square Street and Shanghai Street
- > Junction with Reclamation Street
- Yau Ma Tei Jockey Club Polyclinic (Old Block) (油麻地賽馬會分科診療所 (舊翼))
- > Junction with Canton Road
- Yau Ma Tei Police Station. At the corner of Public Square Street and Canton Road. Now listed as a Grade II historic building, it was completed in 1922 and largely retains its original design. It replaced an older police station which was also located on Public Square Street.
- Prosperous Garden
- > Junction with Ching Ping Street (澄平街)

== See also ==
- List of streets and roads in Hong Kong
