= Shanghai Street =

Street in Kowloon, Hong Kong

Coordinates: 22.30647°N 114.16959°E

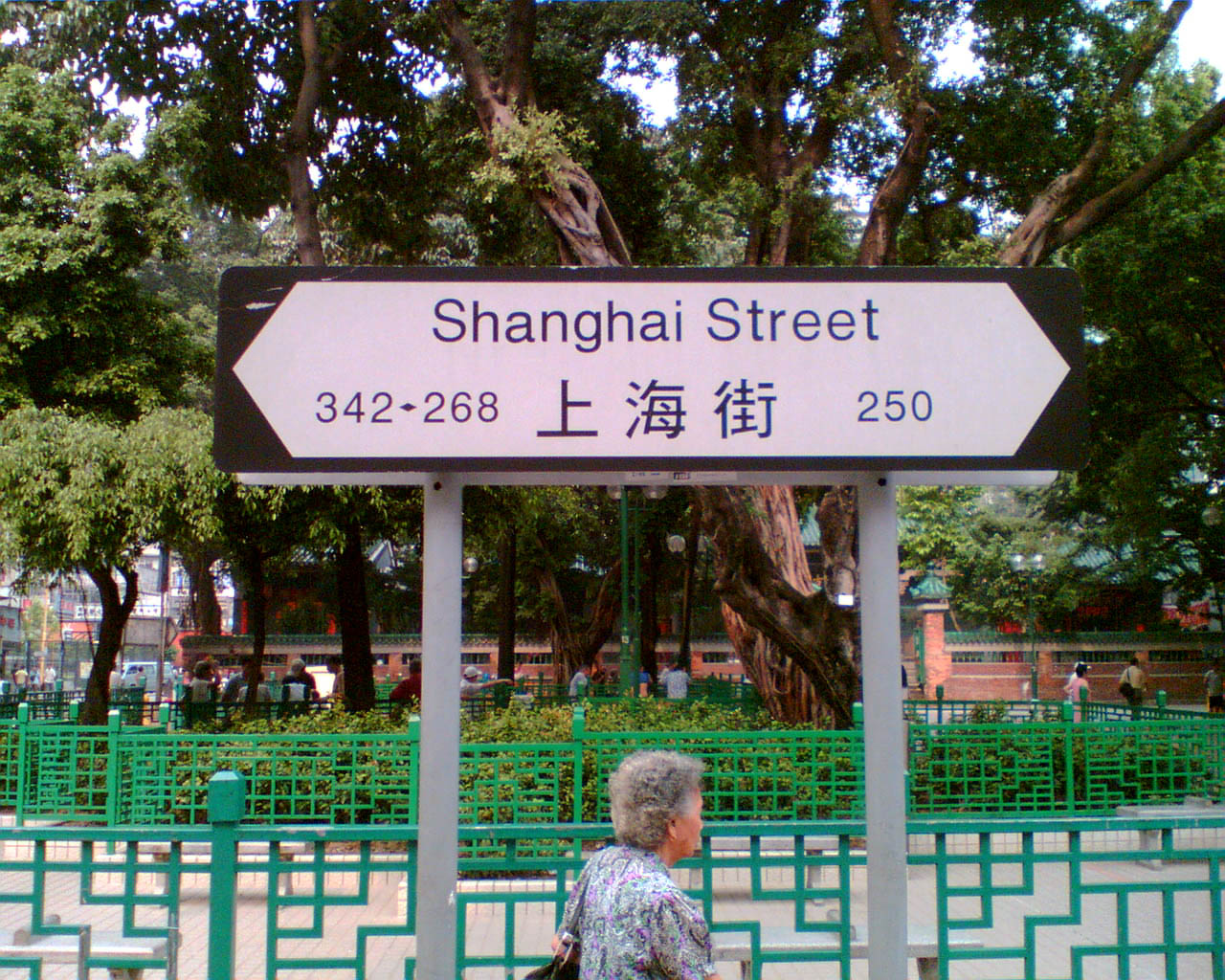
- The Yau Ma Tei Tin Hau Temple at Yung Shue Tau.
- Chinese: 上海街
Transcriptions
Standard Mandarin
- Hanyu Pinyin: Shànghǎi Jiē
Yue: Cantonese
- Yale Romanization: seung6 hoi2 gaai1

Shanghai Street (Chinese: 上海街; Jyutping: soeng6 hoi2 gaai1) is a 2.3 km long street in the Jordan, Yau Ma Tei and Mong Kok areas of Kowloon, Hong Kong. Completed in 1887 under the name of Station Street (差館街), it was once the most prosperous street in Kowloon. It originates from the south at Austin Road, and terminates in the north at Lai Chi Kok Road. Parallel to Shanghai Street are Nathan Road, Temple Street, Portland Street, Reclamation Street and Canton Road. Though parallel, Shanghai Street was marked by 2- to 3-floor Chinese-style buildings while Nathan Road was marked by Western-style buildings.

== History ==
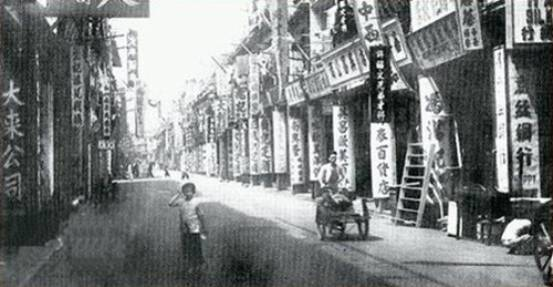
Shanghai Street in the early 1900s.

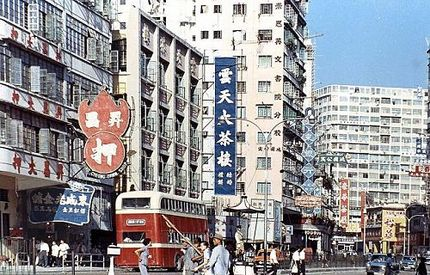
Shanghai Street in the 1960s.

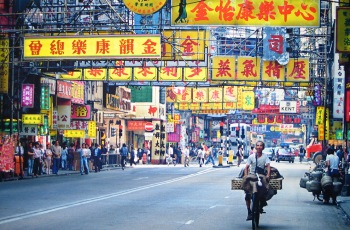
Hanging signs advertise the presence of sex industry venues mixed in with other shops and residential buildings.

Prior to 1874 the land that Shanghai Street stands on was sea, making Shanghai Street an early example of reclaimed land in Hong Kong.

The street is not so named because of a Shanghainese population. Prior to being renamed Shanghai Street it was originally called Station Street, for Yau Ma Tei Police Station, a police station located at the junction of Public Square Street and Shanghai Street, until its relocation to No. 627 Canton Road in 1922. Since the police station was the landmark of the area, the street was named for it. On 12 November 1898, it was divided into two sections, Station Street South and Station Street North.

There were two reasons for the renaming. First, in 1909, the Government started to name streets in Kowloon after major Chinese provinces that traded with Hong Kong, to recognise Hong Kong as a commercial port. The British colonial government of Hong Kong found the area of Station Street was as prosperous as Shanghai in China at the time when Hong Kong trade relation with Shanghai. Therefore, they renamed Station Street to Shanghai Street on 19 March 1909. The second reason was that there was a street called Upper Station Street (差館上街) in Sheung Wan, on Hong Kong Island and it caused confusion with the one in Yau Ma Tei and Mong Kok.

One of the then-two Magistrate's Courts of Kowloon was located in Shanghai Street between Public Square Street and Market Street, until it was demolished in 1957. The other one was the Kowloon Magistracy in Gascoigne Road, built in 1936 and renamed the South Kowloon District Court in 1957. The North Kowloon Magistracy, built in 1960 in Shek Kip Mei, later shared the workload.

Before the 1970s when Nathan Road became prosperous, Shanghai Street was the leading business corridor in Hong Kong. In the mid 19th century Station Street had already started to prosper. In the tax record book of 1880, there were 150 taxed units, including a brothel, the most number of units at that time. There were about 9,000 people living in Yau Ma Tei at that time, and the district was already the most populated. With the addition of over a hundred shops, the district became the most prosperous area from the late 19th century to the mid 20th century. The shops there were originally related to traditional Chinese trades and livelihoods, including shops selling traditional wedding dresses, fung shui tools, pawnshops and books. From the 1970s to 1990s, the Mong Kok area of Shanghai Street was characterised by a wide variety of hostess clubs and other venues related to the sex trade; these continue to trade alongside the traditional businesses and residential units.

== Features ==
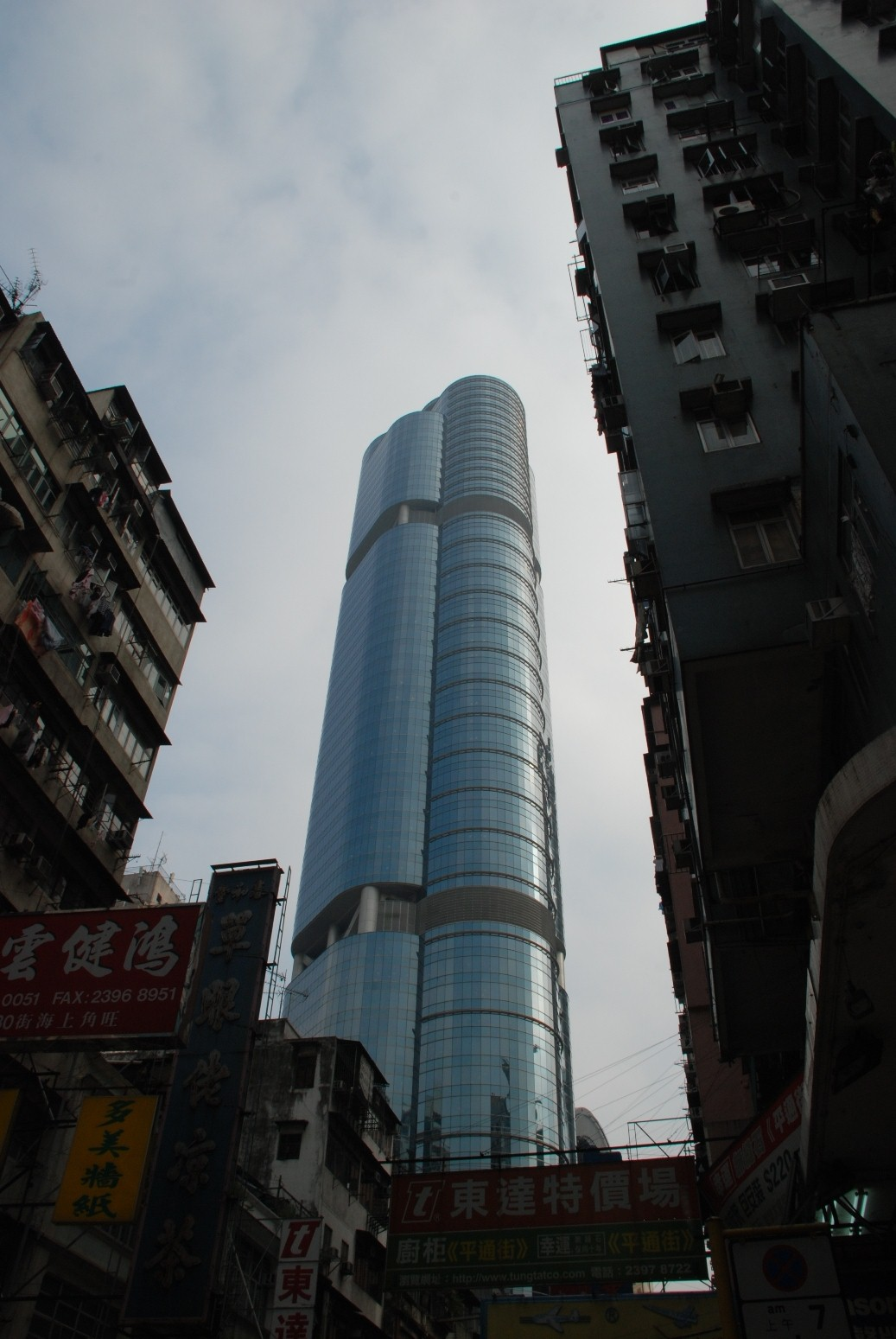
Langham Place seen from Shanghai Street.

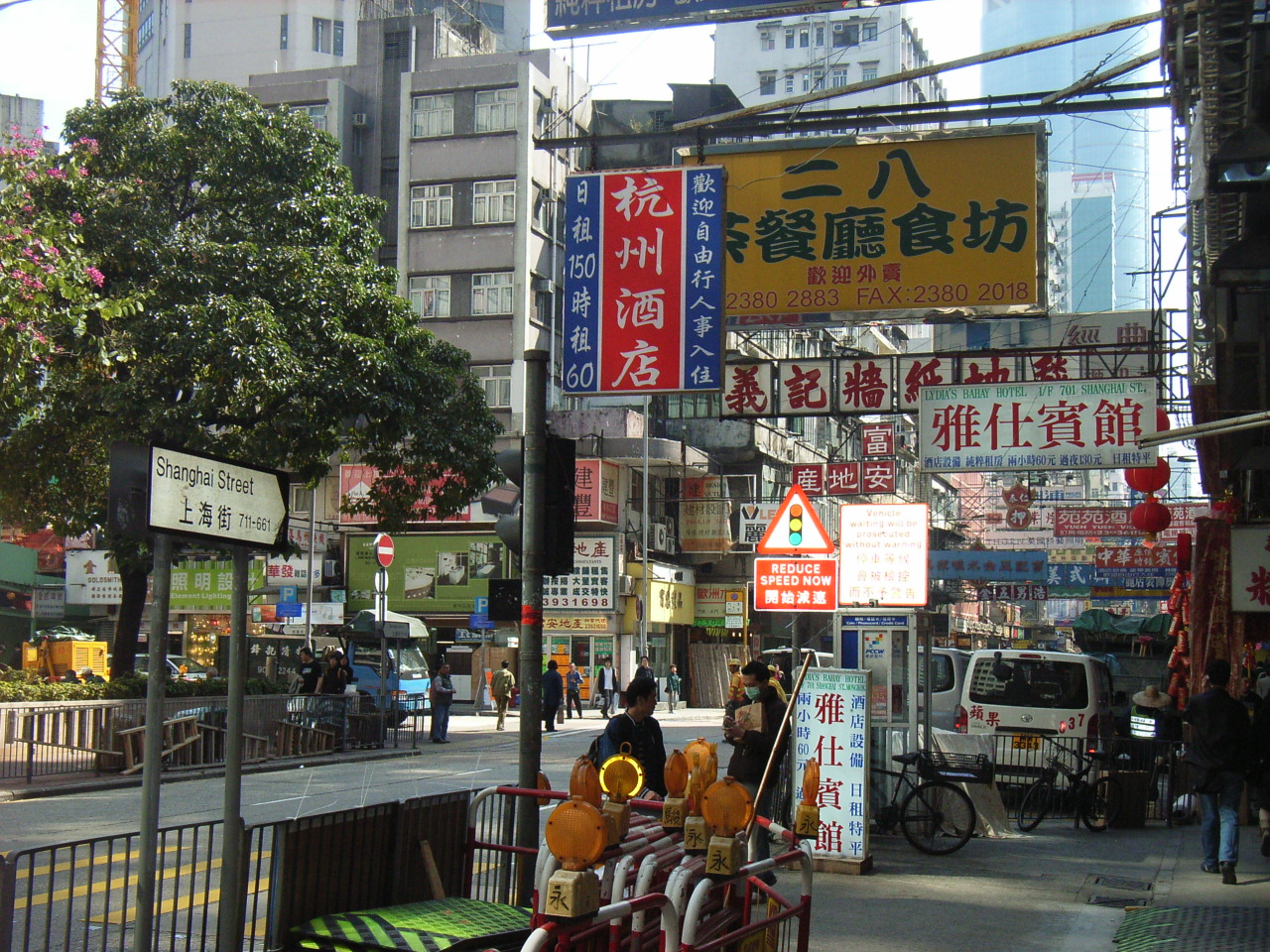
The northern end of Shanghai Street, near its intersection with Lai Chi Kok Road.

The following list follows a south-north order. (W) indicates the western side of the road, while (E) indicates the eastern side.

- > intersection with Austin Road
- > intersection with Bowring Street
- (W) > junction with Min Street
- (W) A small portion of King George V Memorial Park, Kowloon
- > intersection with Jordan Road
- > intersection with Nanking Street
- > intersection with Ning Po Street
- > intersection with Saigon Street
- > intersection with Pak Hoi Street
- > intersection with Kansu Street
- (E) Yau Ma Tei Car Park Building (No. 250)
- (E) > junction with Market Street
- (E) Yau Ma Tei Community Centre Rest Garden (Yung Shue Tau)
- > intersection with Public Square Street
- > intersection with Wing Sing Lane
- (E) > junction with Hi Lung Lane
- (E) Nos. 316–318 Shanghai Street
- > intersection with Man Ming Lane
- (E) Hong Kong International Hobby and Toy Museum (No. 330)
- (E) Engineer's Office of the Former Pumping Station (No. 344)
- (W) Street Sleepers' Shelter (No. 345A)
- > intersection with Shek Lung Street
- > intersection with Waterloo Road
- > intersection with Pitt Street
- > intersection with Hamilton Street
- > intersection with Dundas Street
- (E) > junction with Changsha Street
- (E) Joye Fook Mansion (Nos. 466, 466A & 468)
- > intersection with Soy Street
- > intersection with Shantung Street
- (E) Langham Place (shopping mall and office tower)
- (W) Cordis Hong Kong (No. 555)
- > intersection with Argyle Street
- (E) Nos. 600–626 Shanghai Street
- > intersection with Fife Street
- > intersection with Mong Kok Road
- > intersection with Bute Street
- (E) Mei Koon Mansion (Nos. 698–710)
- > intersection with Arran Street
- > intersection with Lai Chi Kok Road

== Heritage ==
=== Engineer's Office of the Former Pumping Station ===
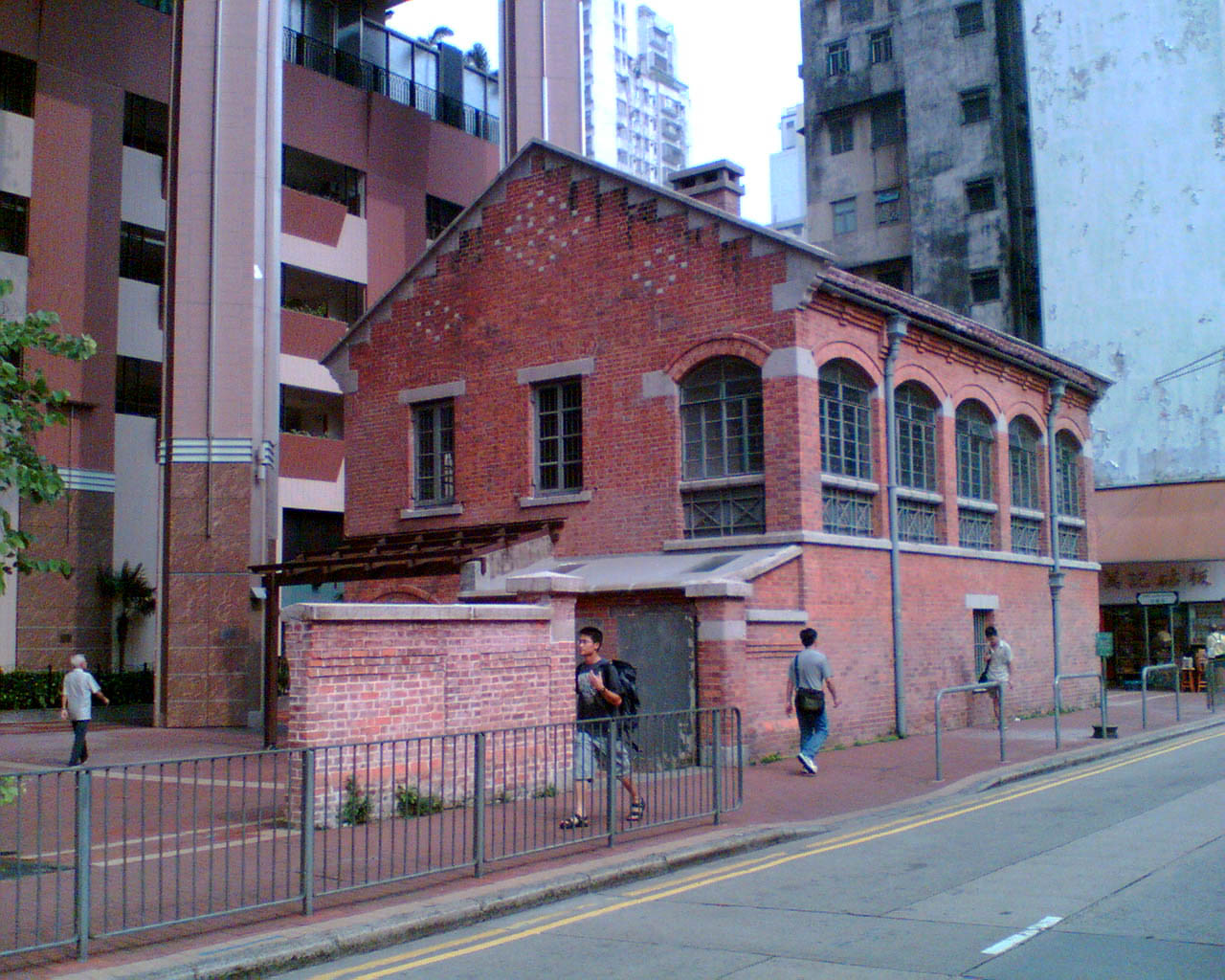
Engineer's Office of the Former Pumping Station.

The Engineer's Office of the Former Pumping Station, Water Supplies Department (前水務署抽水站工程師辦公室), sometimes called "The Red Brick House" (紅磚屋), is a Grade I historical building located at No. 344 Shanghai Street.

It is the only remaining building of a former pumping station, which was built in 1895 and ceased operation in 1911. Its three buildings underwent different adaptive reuse: one of them, now demolished, was converted into a post office in the 1910s–1920s. Another one became a hazardous goods store. The remaining building became a hawkers control office. In the pre-war and early post-war days Yunnan Lane, which was located by the side of the post office, became a place where professional letter writers set up their stalls. The post office ceased operation in 1967 with the opening of the nearby Kowloon Central Post Office. The vacated post office was then used as a "Street Sleepers' Shelter" operated by the Salvation Army, until the end of the 1990s, when the shelter for the homeless moved across the street to the building on 345A Shanghai Street, where it is still located.

The building is now vacant awaiting a suitable adaptive re-use. It is proposed that the Red Brick Building will revitalise in conjunction with the Yau Ma Tei Theatre as a Xiqu Activity Centre, providing a performing and practising venue for small-scale Cantonese Opera performance. It would also serve as training venue for budding artists. This revitalisation project was endorsed by the Public Works Subcommittee of the Finance Committee of the Legislative Council at its meeting on 21 January 2009.

=== Shophouses ===
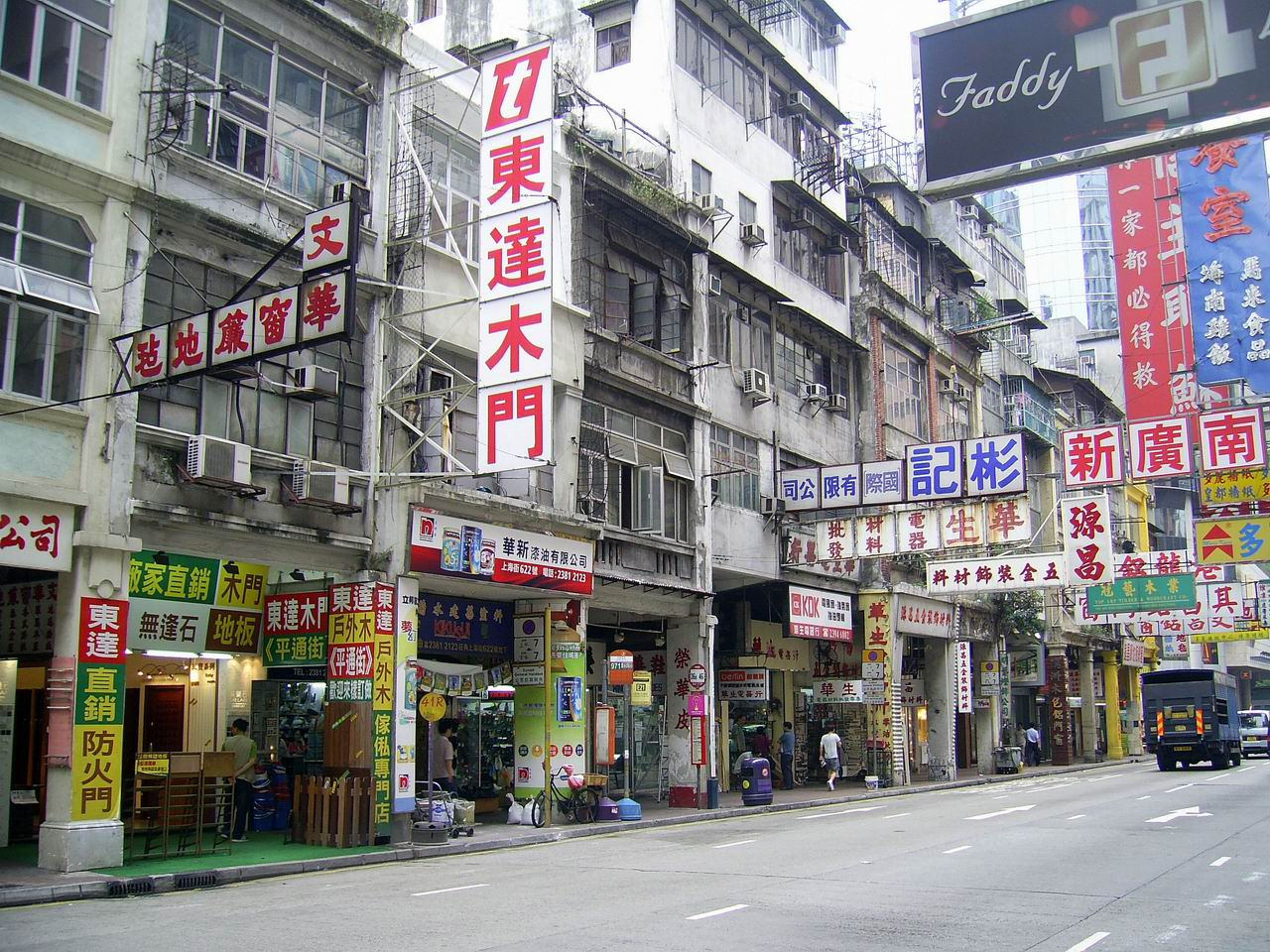
Nos. 600–626 Shanghai Street, in Mong Kok.

Nos. 600-626 Shanghai Street, or more specifically Nos. 600, 602, 604, 606, 612, 614, 620, 622, 624 and 626, is a group of ten pre-war shophouses (tong-lau) in the Mong Kok section of Shanghai Street, that have been listed as Grade I historical buildings for their historical value. It is believed that Nos. 620 – 626 are the oldest buildings among them. No. 330 Shanghai Street, a post-war tong lau adjacent to the Engineer's Office of the Former Pumping Station, houses the Hong Kong International Hobby and Toy Museum.

==== History of shophouses ====
Shophouses were mainly occupied by Chinese and predominantly seen all over southern Chinese cities and town in the 19th century. There were various reasons for the existence of tong lau in Hong Kong, which including economic development of Hong Kong, Second World War and also the influx of Chinese migrants to Hong Kong.

These 10 typical shophouses are believed to have been built in the 1920s and 1930s, which are typical of an old commercial street. They are composed of shops on the ground floor that open up to a public arcade or "five-foot way", and low-rented residential accommodations upstairs. Shops selling furnishings, building construction materials (such as window frames, curtains, paint and hardware), traditional Chinese utensils, Chinese and Western household kitchen tools, ceremonial items, traditional Chinese wedding gowns, grocery, snake soup as well as traditional Nepalese snacks can be found in Shanghai Street.

As part of Hong Kong's living heritage, those shop houses are still functional in their communities and play important roles in the lives of local people. In recent years, residents and individuals have refurbished some shophouses and converted them into restaurants, shops or artists' interaction centre like Shanghai Street Artspace project managed by the Department of Creative Arts of the Hong Kong Institute of Education (HKIEd) aiming to explore, develop and learn from the artistic culture of Yau Ma Tei.

==== Preservation ====
In September 2008, the Urban Renewal Authority (URA) announced two heritage conservation plans, which proposed to preserve the ten blocks of pre-war shophouses on Shanghai Street in Mong Kok and ten other blocks on Prince Edward Road East. Four 1960s buildings that dissect the shophouse cluster in Shanghai Street are also included in the project. The Shanghai Street project covers an area of about 1,128m^{2}. The project aims to preserve and revitalise these shophouse clusters for commercial uses.

The projects, which costs HK$1.33 billion, is the largest single conservation initiative ever undertaken in Hong Kong. This conservation plan is the initiative of the expanded conservation strategy for 48 pre-war shophouses across Hong Kong. The URA has two alternatives: to buy property rights of the shop houses and redevelop them into commercial or other uses; to re-zone them so as to limit the use of those shop houses for preservation purposes. Most of the cost, about $1.23 billion, would be spent on property acquisition and tenants' rehousing of the 73 households with 220 residents in the two sites' 24 buildings. The remaining one-tenth of the sum is used for renovation.

For shophouses in Shanghai Street, necessary building services such as lifts, fire escapes and disabled access for the shophouses would be built in the 1960s buildings. The exact usage of the revamped shophouses has not been determined and is open to any options. One of the tentative suggestions is to house low-priced restaurant so that the public will have opportunities to use the verandas. The proposed aim is transforming Shanghai Street into a popular food street, or directly translated from the Chinese as "Food Paradise".

In addition, the authority plans to reserve the shops upstairs for the arts community, such as bookstores and dance studios. The cluster of shophouses on Prince Edward Road East would be remained as a part of the flower market so that the thriving flower trade would not be disrupted.

The Prince Edward Road East project and the Shanghai Street project are expected to be completed by 2014 and 2015 respectively. But some people see problems with the URA's plans: not so much capital a conservation strategy as an acquisition or buy-out of properties; elimination of Shanghai Street true character by removing the stores and residents.

== Building and street rehabilitation ==
Since 2005, the Urban Renewal Authority has cooperated with different real estate developers to rehabilitate Shanghai Street. Here is the summary and the photos after rehabilitation.

Building/ Street name	Address	OP date	Latest comprehensive rehabilitation works completed	Pictures
Joye Fook Mansion (載福樓)	466, 466A & 468 Shanghai Street, Yau Ma Tei	1966	Feb 2005	
Mei Koon Mansion (美觀大廈)	698–710 Shanghai Street, Mong Kok	1966	Mar 2005	
316–318 Shanghai Street	316–318 Shanghai Street, Yau Ma Tei	1957	Jun 2005	

The first rehabilitation project was Joye Fook Mansion, which is located on 466, 466A & 468 Shanghai Street, Yau Ma Tei. Joye Fook Mansion has been occupied since 1966 and its building age is 43. The rehabilitation works completed in February 2005. The next rehabilitation project was Mei Koon Mansion located on 698–710 Shanghai Street, Mong Kok. Mei Koon Mansion has been occupied since 1966. The rehabilitation works completed in March 2005. In June 2005 the final rehabilitation project on 316–318 Shanghai Street had completed.

== Langham Place project ==
To redevelop the area between Mongkok and Yau Ma Tei, Land Development Corporation had proposed the Langham Place project, in which, 11,976 square metres (128,910 sq ft) area was involved across Argyle Street, Portland Street, Shantung Street and Reclamation Street. The main goal is to urbanise the unused area. The existing gross floor area (GFA) in this project was 40,810 square metres. 58 buildings and 2,603 residents had been affected. The construction was completed in July 2004. The total GFA is now 167,419 square metres (1,802,080 sq ft) and the commercial space is 160,870 square metres (1,731,600 sq ft).

Langham Place is a Grade A 59-storey office tower. Its height is 255.1 metres (837 ft). It houses the 665-room Langham Place Hotel and a 15-storey mall. Langham Place comprises an office tower, hotel, and shopping mall.

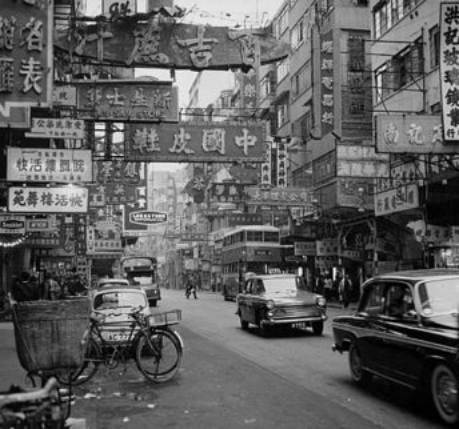
Shanghai Street in the mid 20th century.

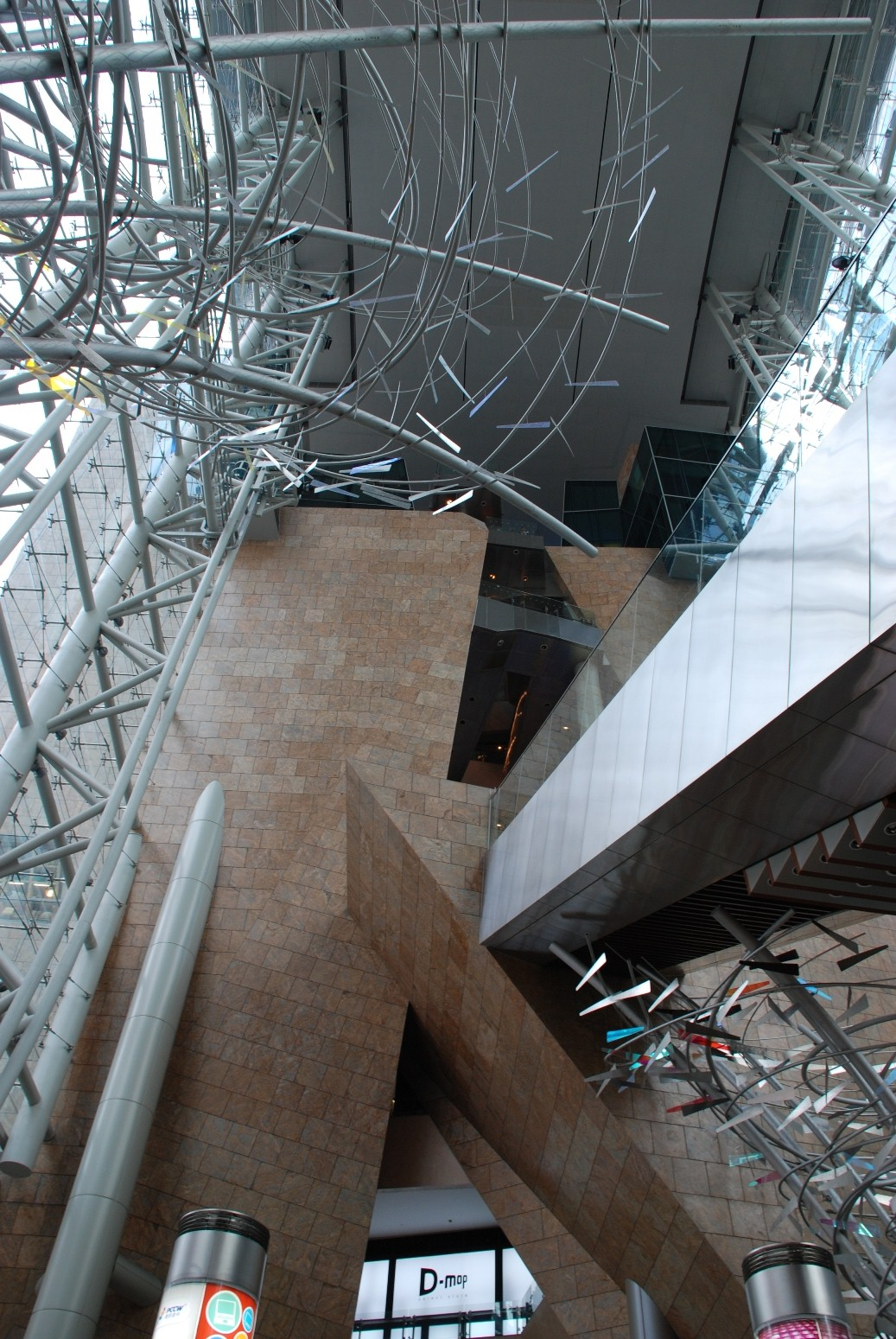
Shopping mall of Langham Place

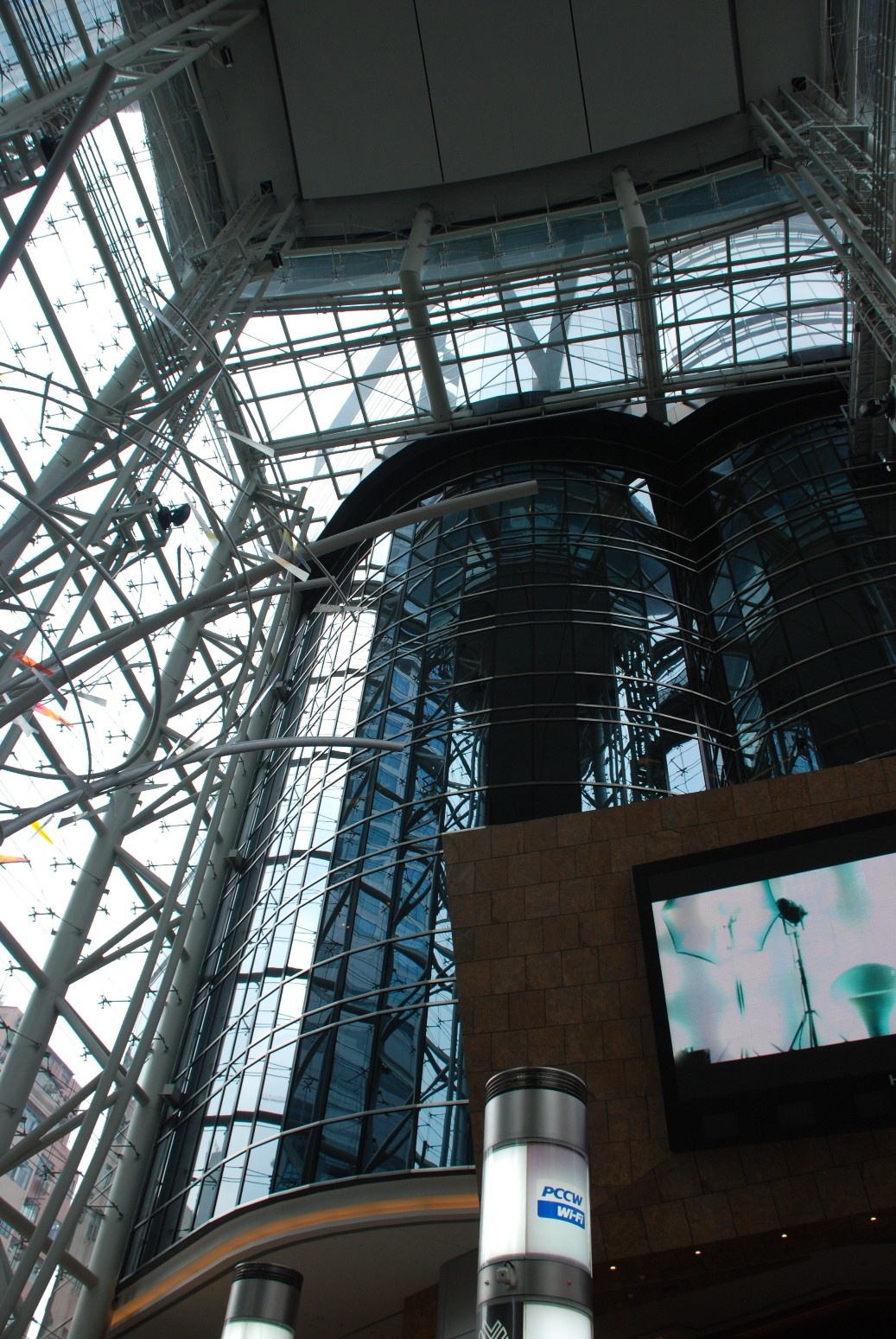
Office tower of Langham Place

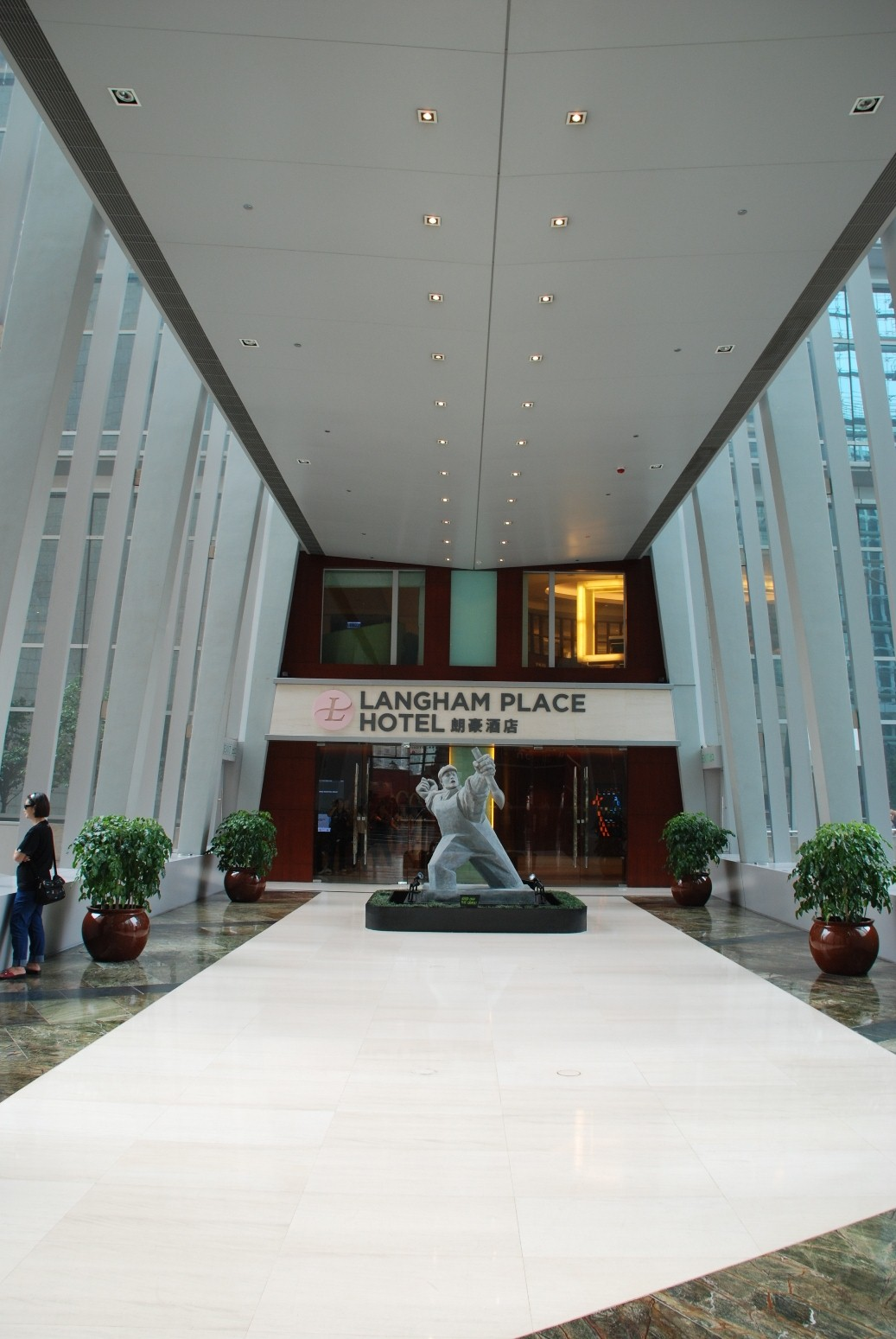
Hotel of Langham Place

== See also ==
- List of streets and roads in Hong Kong
- Yau Tsim Mong District
- Declared monuments of Hong Kong
- Heritage conservation in Hong Kong
- History of Hong Kong
