= Yung Shue Tau =

Public square in Hong Kong

Coordinates: 22.30981°N 114.1703°E

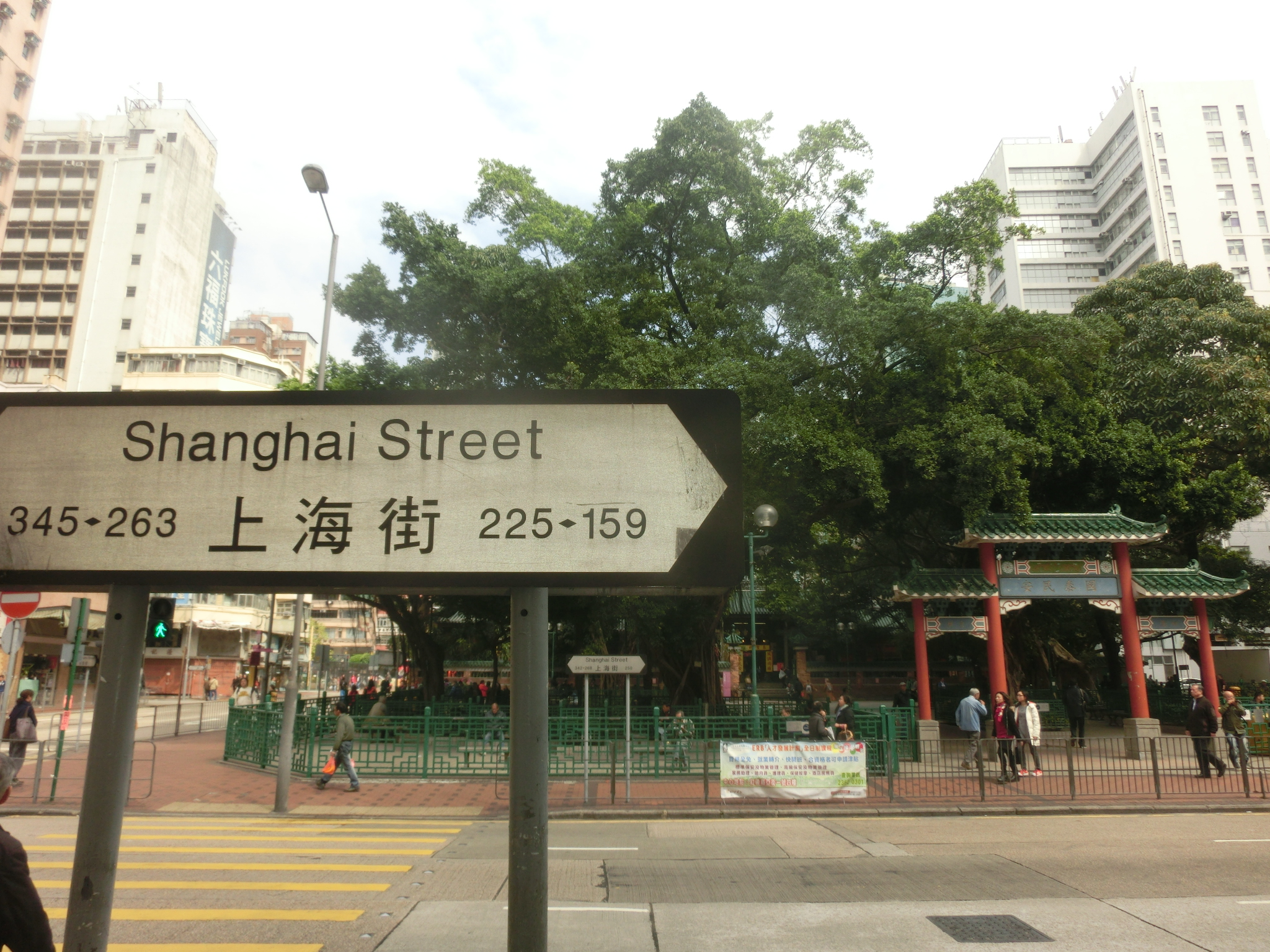
Shanghai Street at Yung Shue Tau. The Yau Ma Tei Tin Hau Temple is visible behind the trees in the background.

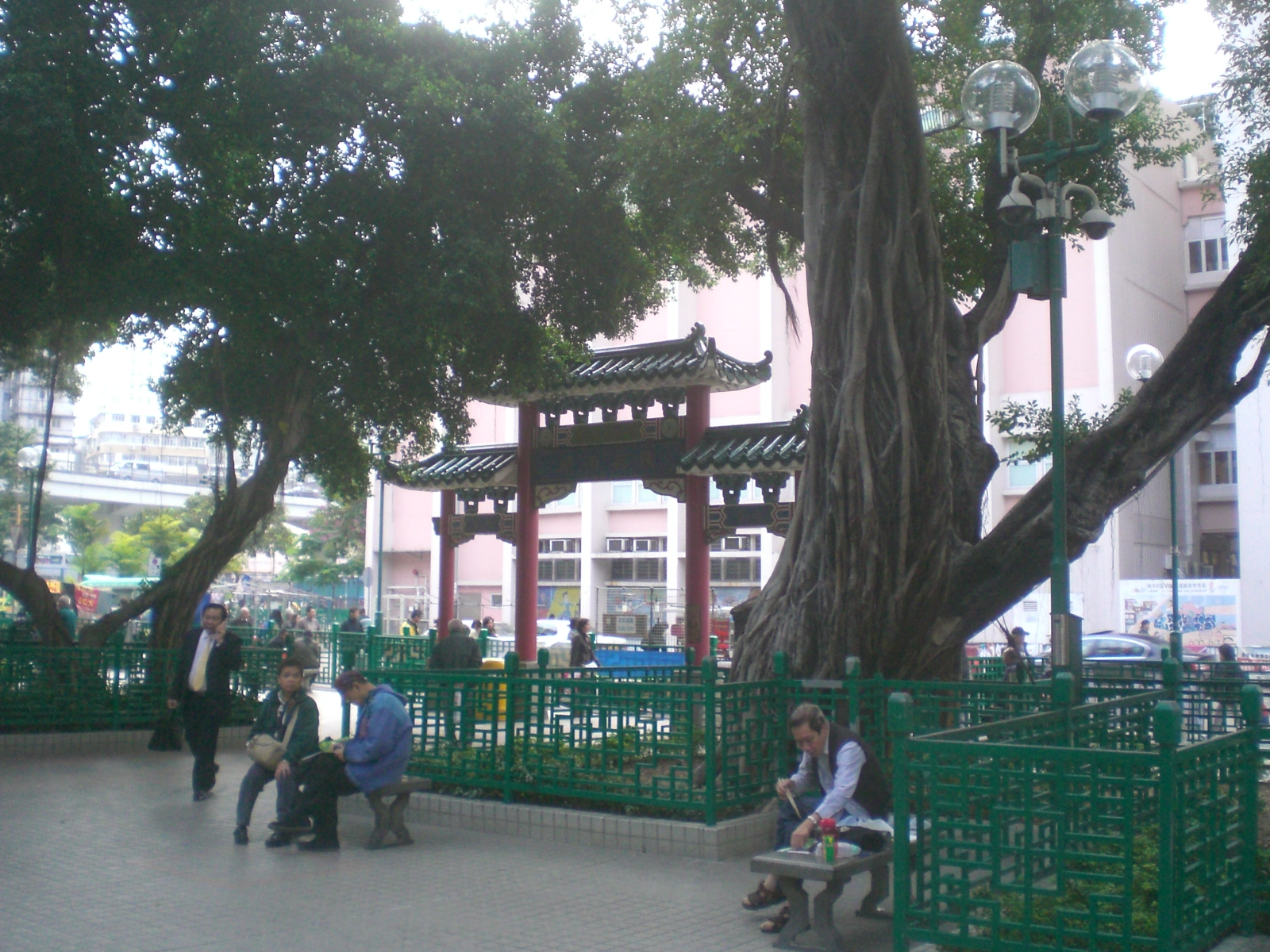
Yau Ma Tei Community Centre Rest Garden

Yung Shue Tau (Chinese: 榕樹頭) is the public square in front of the Tin Hau Temple in Yau Ma Tei of Kowloon in Hong Kong. The name in Cantonese means banyan tree head, and many banyan trees are still there. Yung Shue Tau is known natively but seldom written on the maps. The temple and square are deemed as the heart of the Yau Ma Tei and the remnant of fishing traditions.

== Location ==
The square is bounded by Shanghai Street, Public Square Street (which derives its name from Yung Shue Tau), Market Street (街市街) and the Tin Hau Temple. It splits the Temple Street into north and south sections. While the square was directly facing the Yau Ma Tei waterfront in the late 19th century, it is now almost three kilometers from the shore, as a consequence of land reclamation.

== Features ==
The square is occupied by the Yau Ma Tei Community Centre Rest Garden (油麻地社區中心休憩花園), a gathering place for senior citizens. Many of them play Chinese chess under the banyan trees at the day time. In the evening, the surroundings are full of hawkers, Cantonese street opera and fortune tellers, and are part of a tourist attraction, the Temple Street Night Market.
