= Mido Cafe =

Coordinates: 22.31024°N 114.17032°E

- Interactive map of Mido Cafe

Restaurant information
- Established: 1950
- Location: 63 Temple Street, Yau Ma Tei, Hong Kong

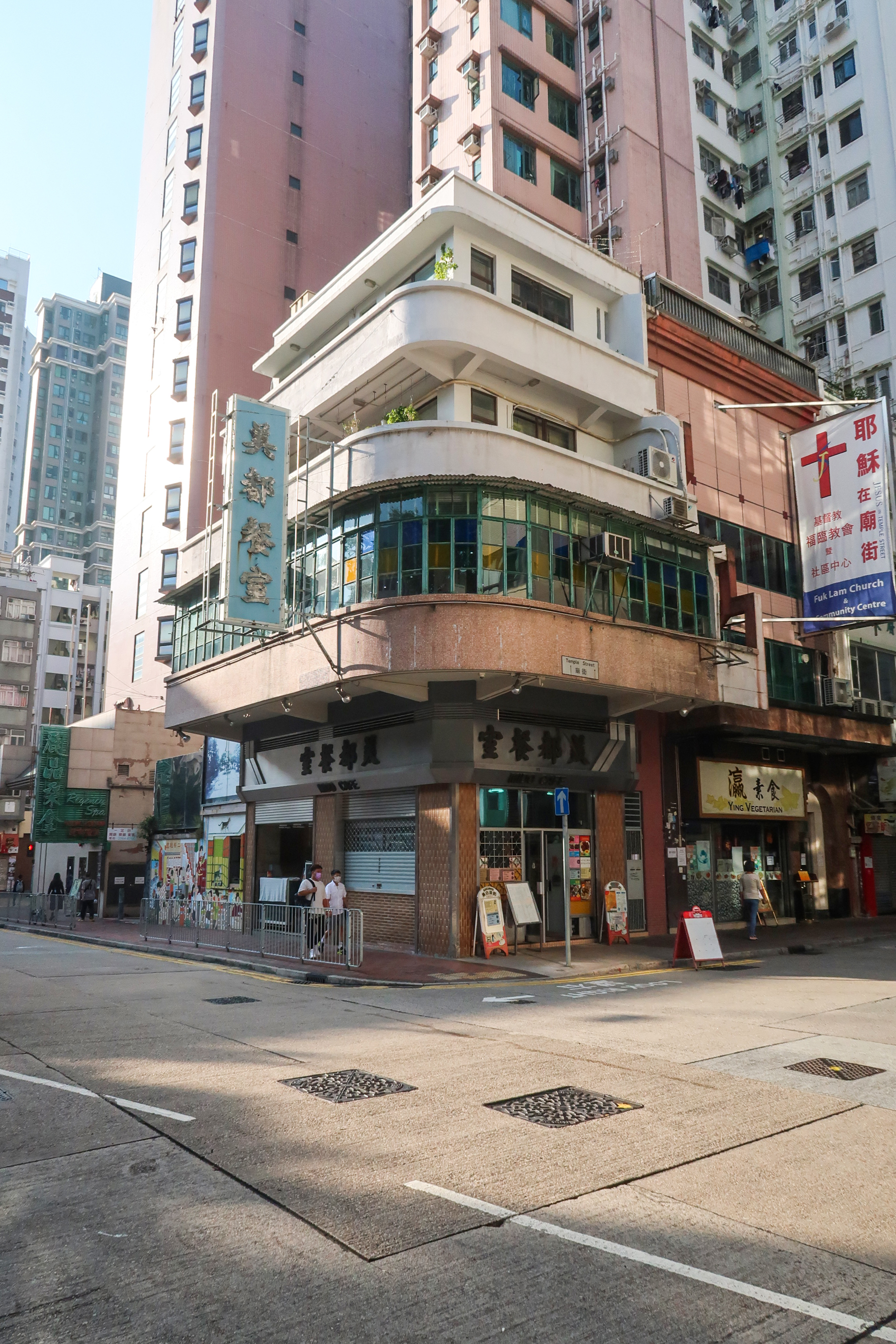
Mido Cafe in 2020.

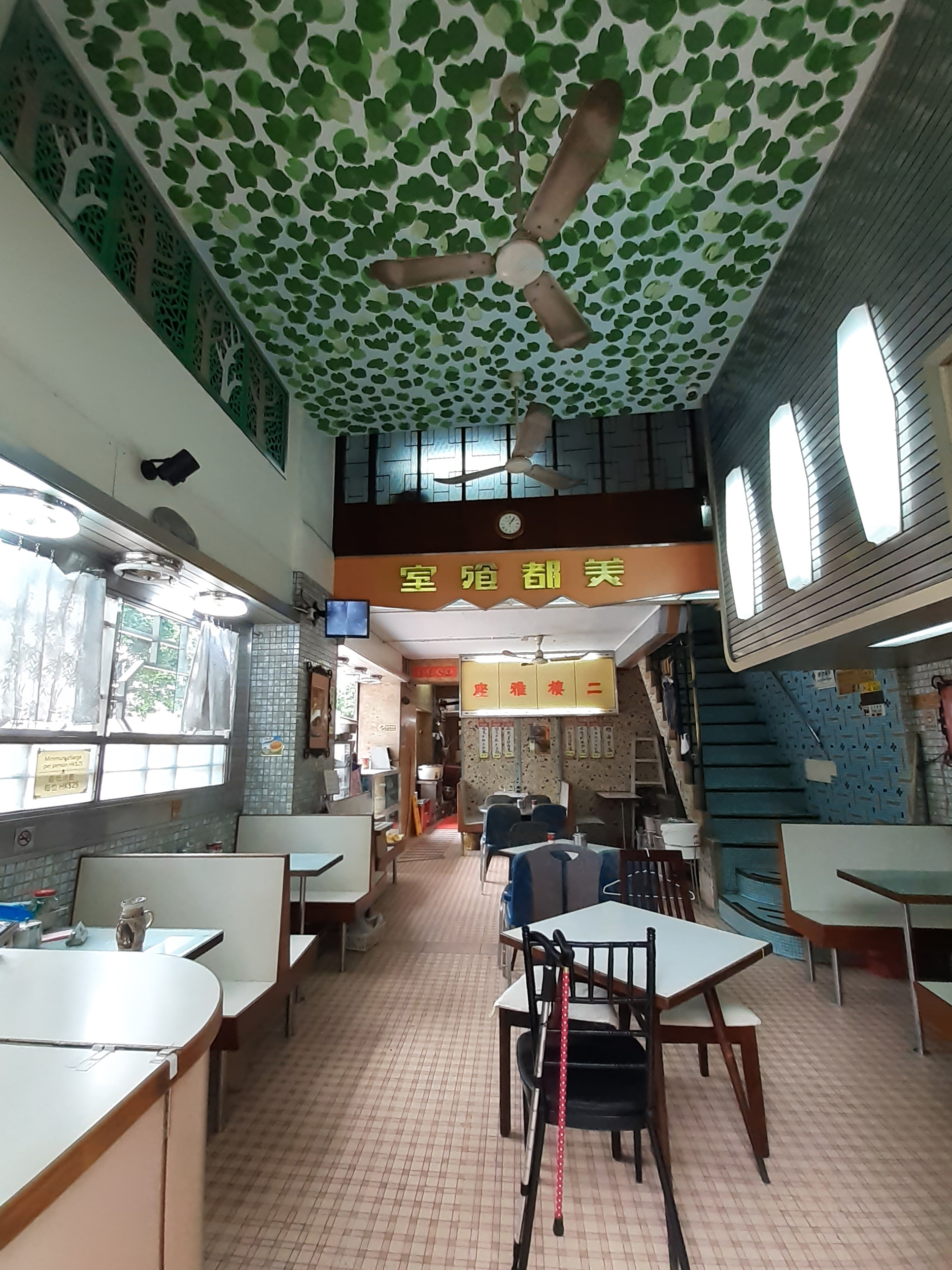
Ground floor of Mido Cafe in 2020.

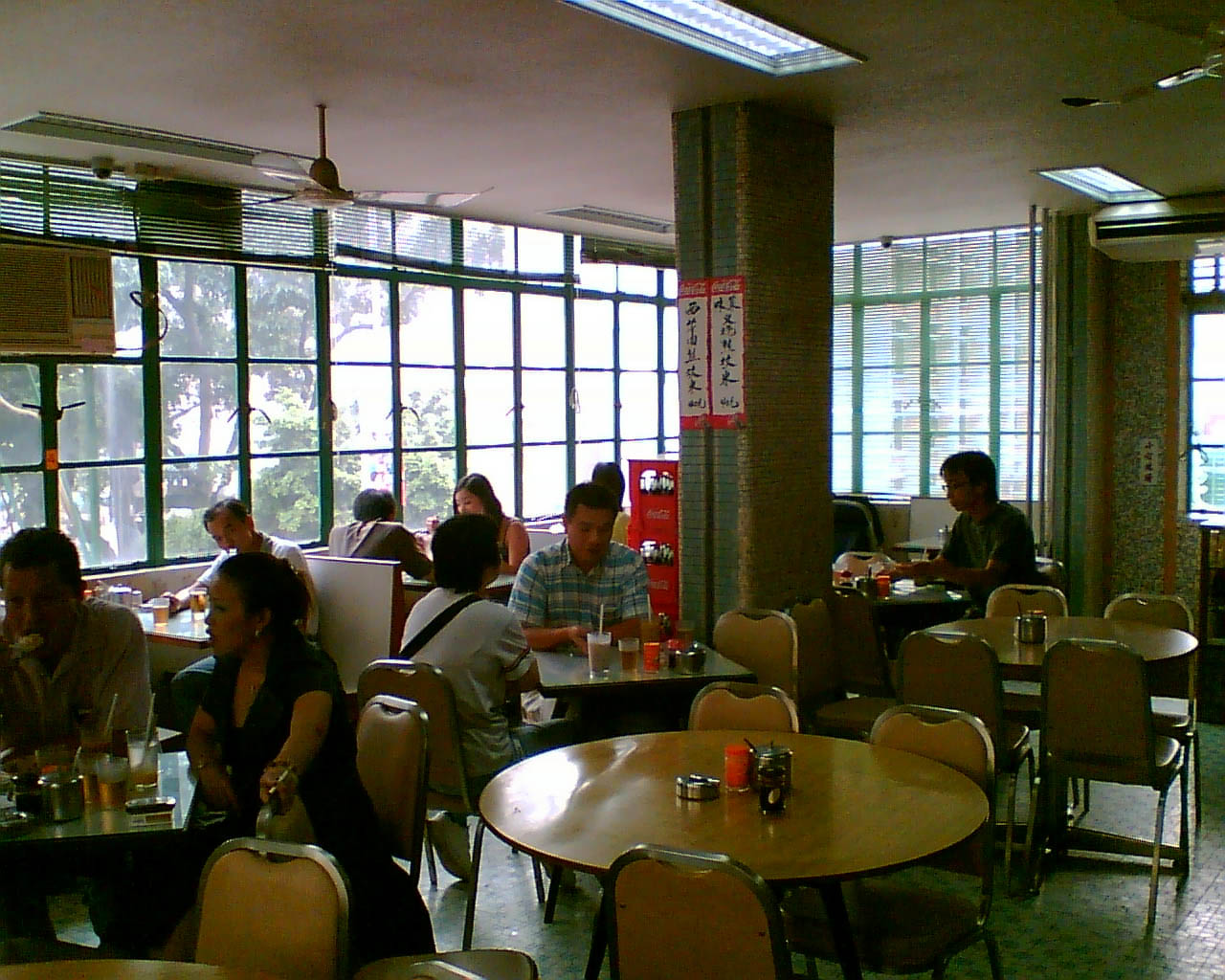
Upper floor of Mido Cafe in 2006.

Mido Cafe (Chinese: 美都餐室) is a cha chaan teng and bing sutt located No. 63 Temple Street, at the corner of Public Square Street, in Yau Ma Tei, Kowloon, Hong Kong.

Mido Cafe was established in 1950. It occupies the ground and first floor of a four-storey concrete building, and has retained a number of original features, such as wood booths and floor and wall tiles of that era.

It suddenly closed on July 18, 2022 via a letter on the door, which did not specify if this was a temporary closure or a permanent closure. After a pause of three months, the restaurant reopened its doors for business on October 28, 2022.

It has been featured in several films and TV shows, including The World of Suzie Wong (1960), Days of Being Wild (1990), Moonlight Express (1999), Street Fighters, Goodbye Mr. Cool (2001), Revolving Doors of Vengeance (2005), Strangers (2018).

== See also ==
- China Cafe
