= Yau Ma Tei Police Station =

Police station in Hong Kong

Coordinates: 22.309676°N 114.168704°E

- 油麻地警署
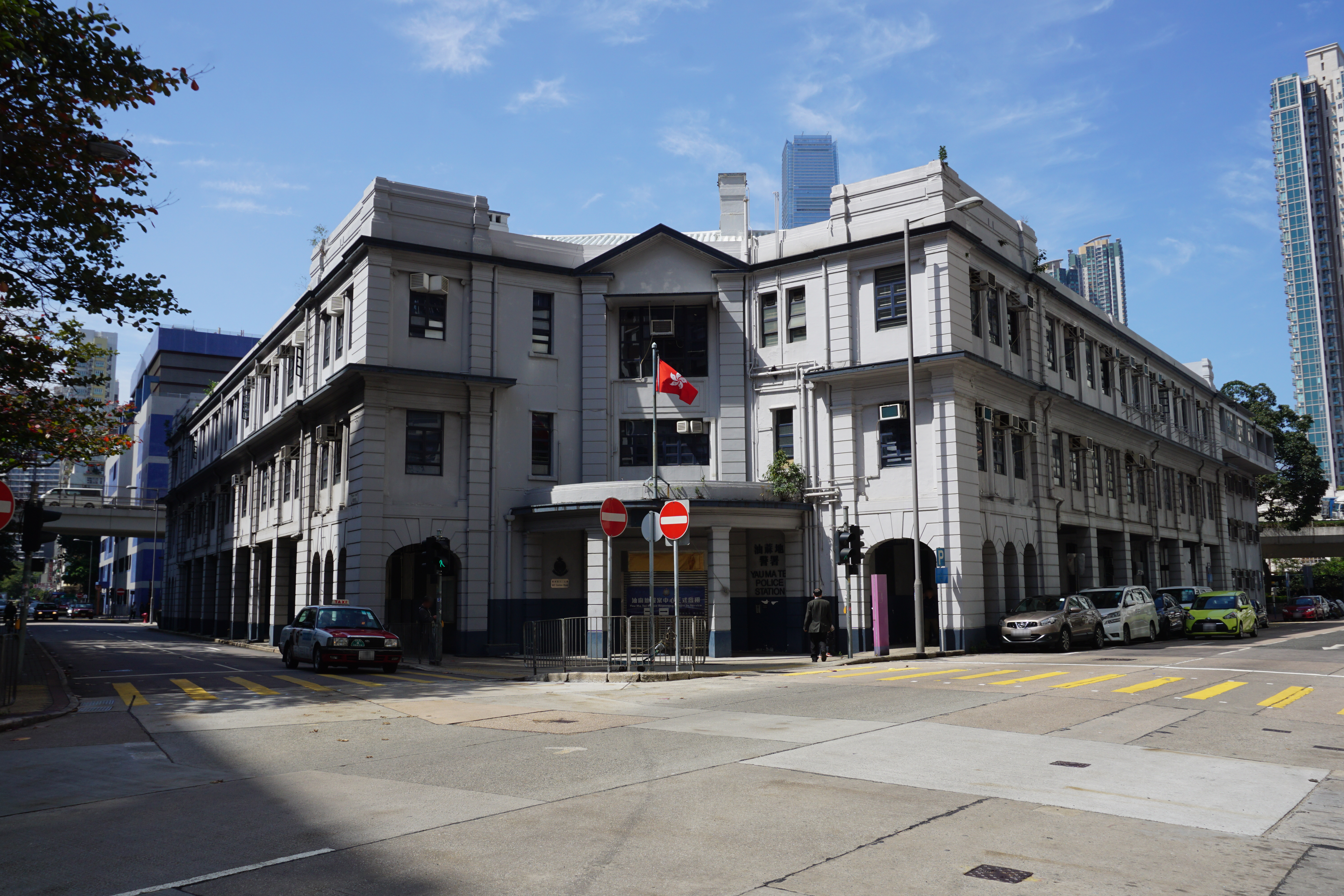
- Old Yau Ma Tei Police Station
- Interactive map of the Yau Ma Tei Police Station area

General information
- Type: Police station
- Architectural style: Neoclassical; Edwardian
- Location: Yau Ma Tei, Kowloon, 627 Canton Road, Hong Kong
- Completed: 1922; 104 years ago
- Closed: 22 May 2016; 10 years ago

Hong Kong Graded Building – Grade II
- Designated: 18 December 2009; 16 years ago
- Reference no.: 320

Yau Ma Tei Police Station
- Chinese: 油麻地警署
Transcriptions
Standard Mandarin
- Hanyu Pinyin: Yóumádì Jǐngshǔ
Yue: Cantonese
- Yale Romanization: Yàuh màah déi gíng chyu
- Jyutping: Jau4 maa4 dei2 ging2 cyu3

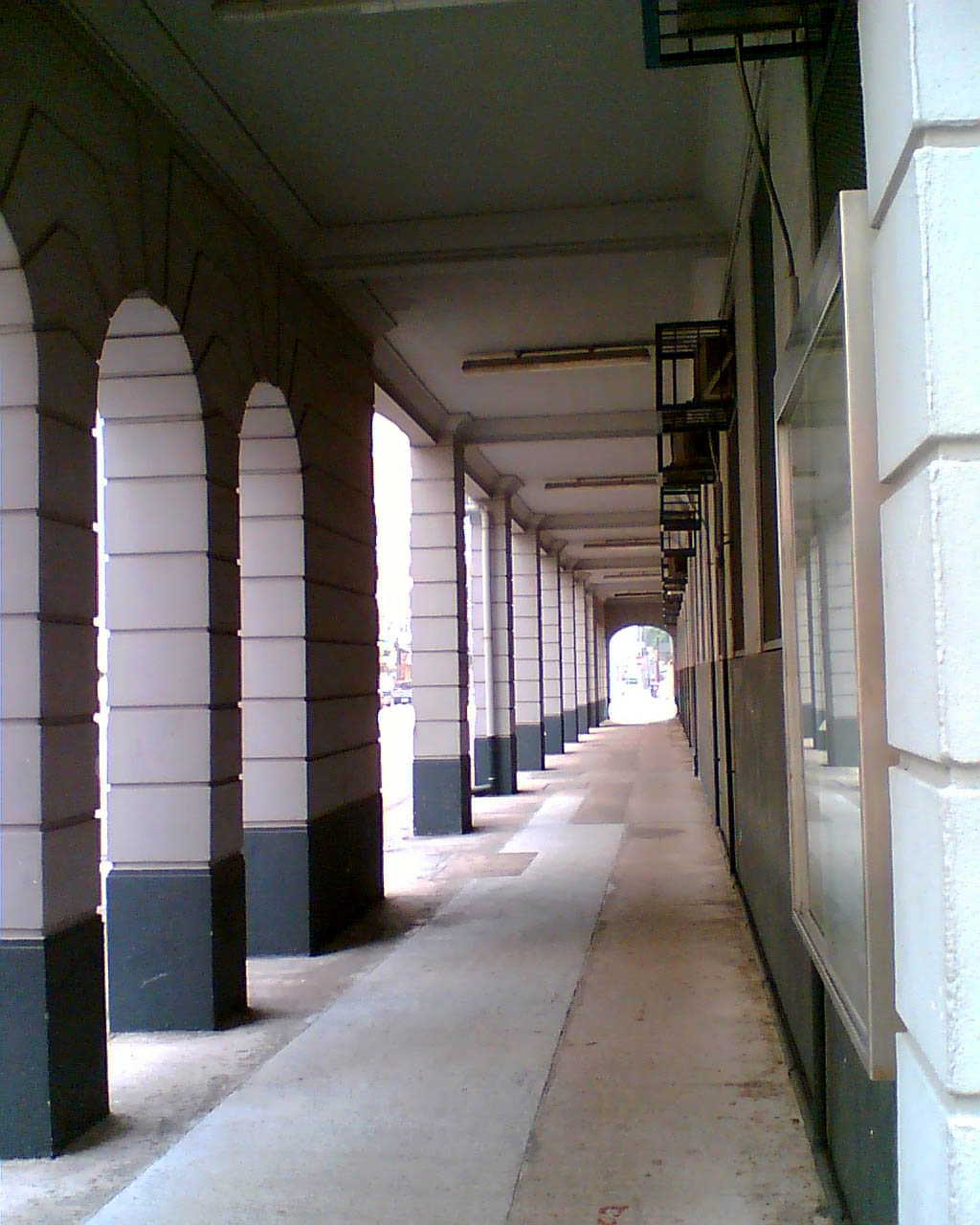
Outside corridor of old station

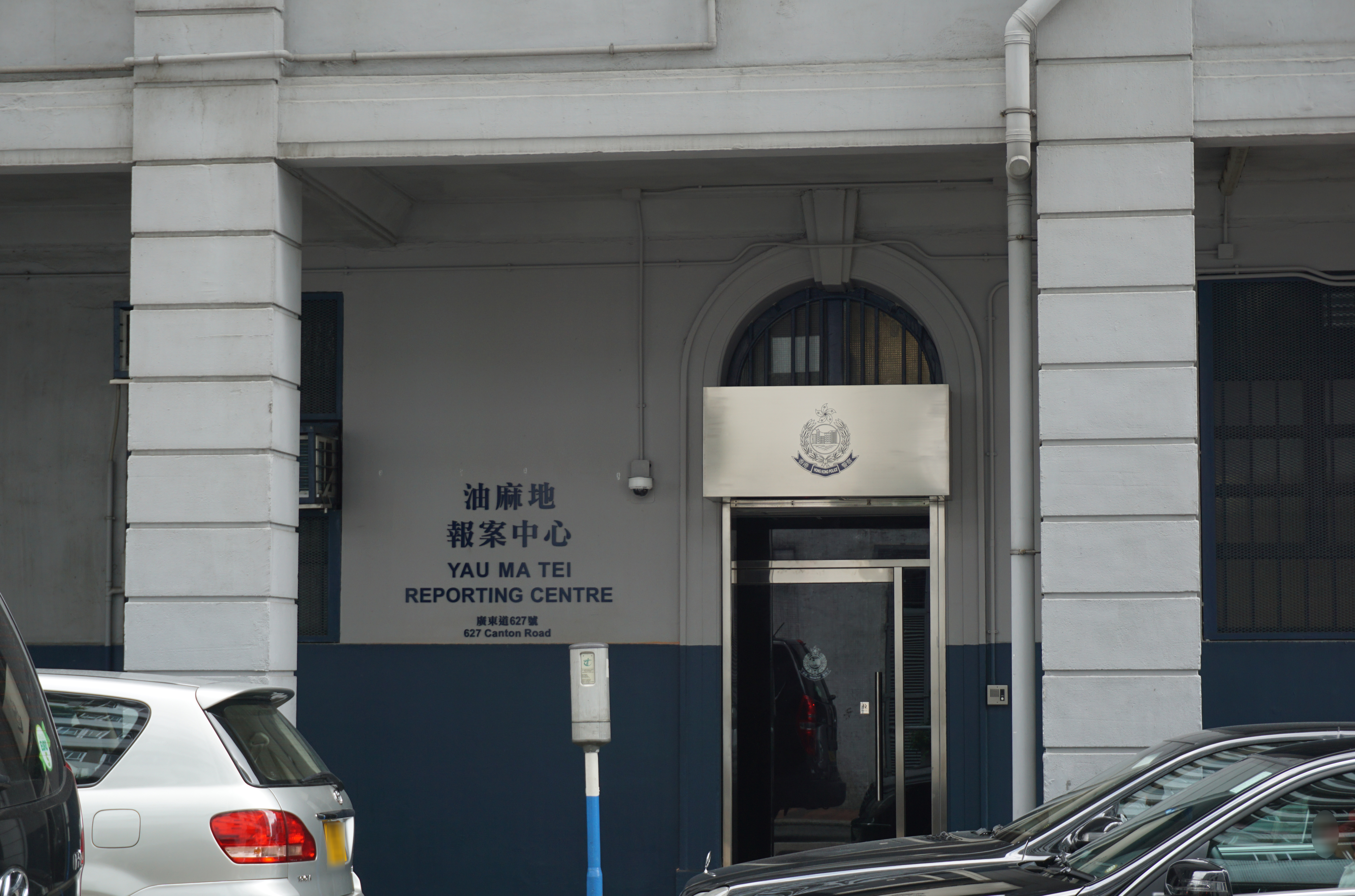
Reporting Centre of old station

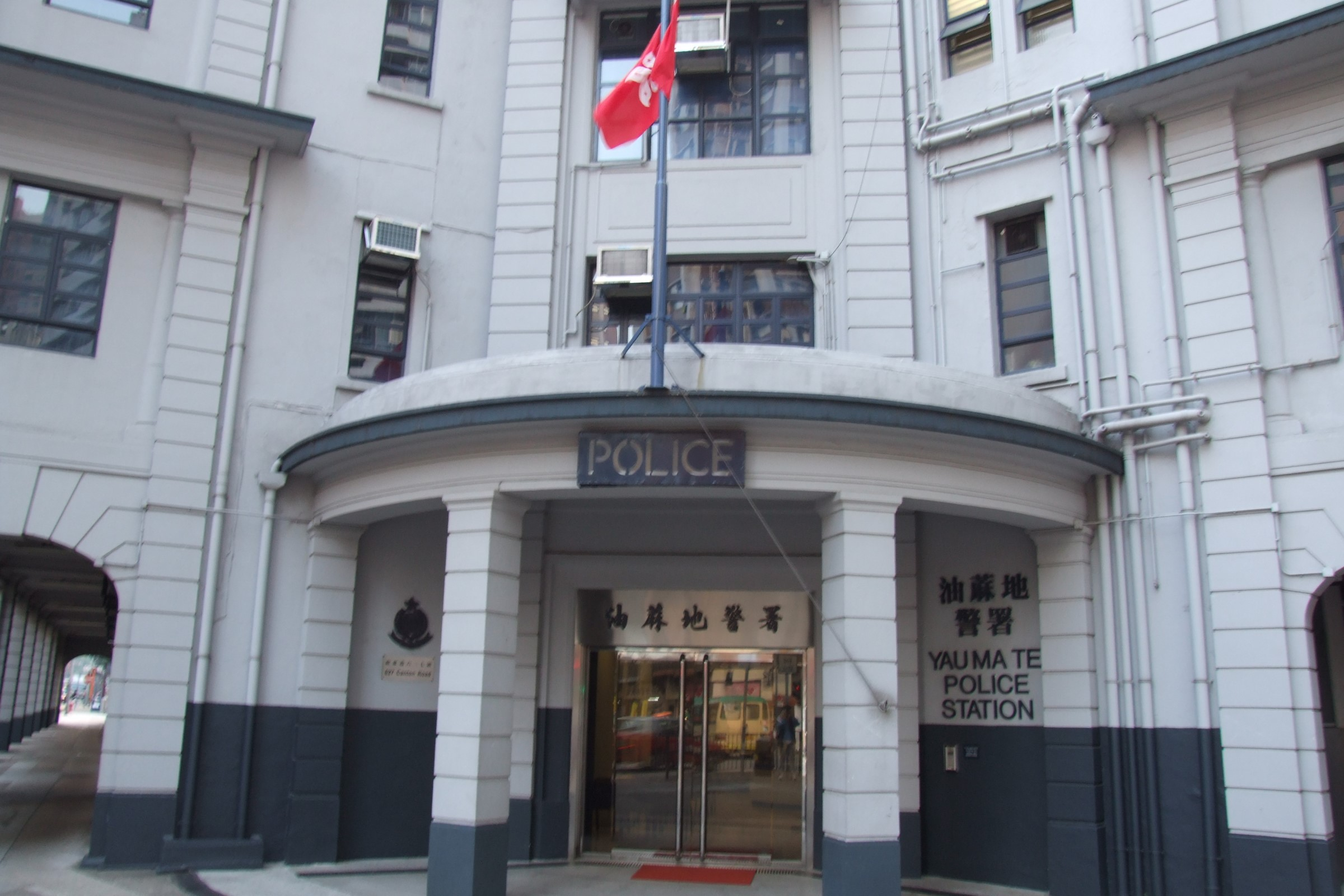
Entrance of old station (closed)

Yau Ma Tei Police Station is a former police station in Yau Ma Tei, Kowloon, Hong Kong. Its buildings at No. 627 Canton Road, at the junction of Public Square Street, were erected in 1922 after relocation from the junction of Public Square Street and Shanghai Street.

The station closed on 22 May 2016 (except for the reporting centre, which will remain open to the public). A new station of the same name opened on that date at No. 3 Yau Cheung Road.

== History ==
Yau Ma Tei Police Station was built in 1922. Additions were made after World War II, including a 1957 extension wing to serve as barracks and an accommodation block, to the west of the existing station. During the 1966 riots, the police station was attacked by a mob but the police managed to suppress it rapidly.

== Architecture ==
The neoclassical Main Block is built in Edwardian Free Style. There is a traditional portico on both sides of Canton Road and Public Square Street. The main entrance is a semi-circular portico set in the indented corner at the junction of Public Square Street and Canton Road. Such indented corners are features often used for feng shui reasons.

== Conservation status ==
On 18 December 2009, the building was classified as a Grade II historic building. Part of the new wing which was constructed in the 1950s is proposed to be underpinned as part of the reprovisioning works associated with the construction of the three-laned Central Kowloon Route in order to retain the structure of the existing structural form for the benefit of future generations. The original building has a large side gate opening onto Public Square Street, to the right of the main entrance. This gate has been permanently locked since at least the late 1970s, because opening is deemed unlucky after a number of shooting incidents involving officers who left the station via the gate. In one corner of the compound there is a small shrine to ward off the bad fung-shui which some believe to be created by the adjacent Gascoigne Road Flyover.

In the wake of growing heritage conservation awareness following the demolition of the Star Ferry Pier in Edinburgh Place, lawmakers are threatening to block funding of the project.

== Cultural appearances ==
The Yau Ma Tei Police Station is the location of a scene of the 2001 film Rush Hour 2. However, because the scene called for an explosion, the real filming had to be done in a movie studio, where wires and other special effects could be used.

The station was also featured in the 2007 TVB programme On the First Beat. It was used multiple times for shots of the canteen, locker rooms, and other locations.

== Transportation ==
- Yau Ma Tei station Exit C

== See also ==
- Historic police buildings in Hong Kong
