= Cordis Hong Kong =

Skyscraper hotel in Hong Kong

Cordis, Hong Kong

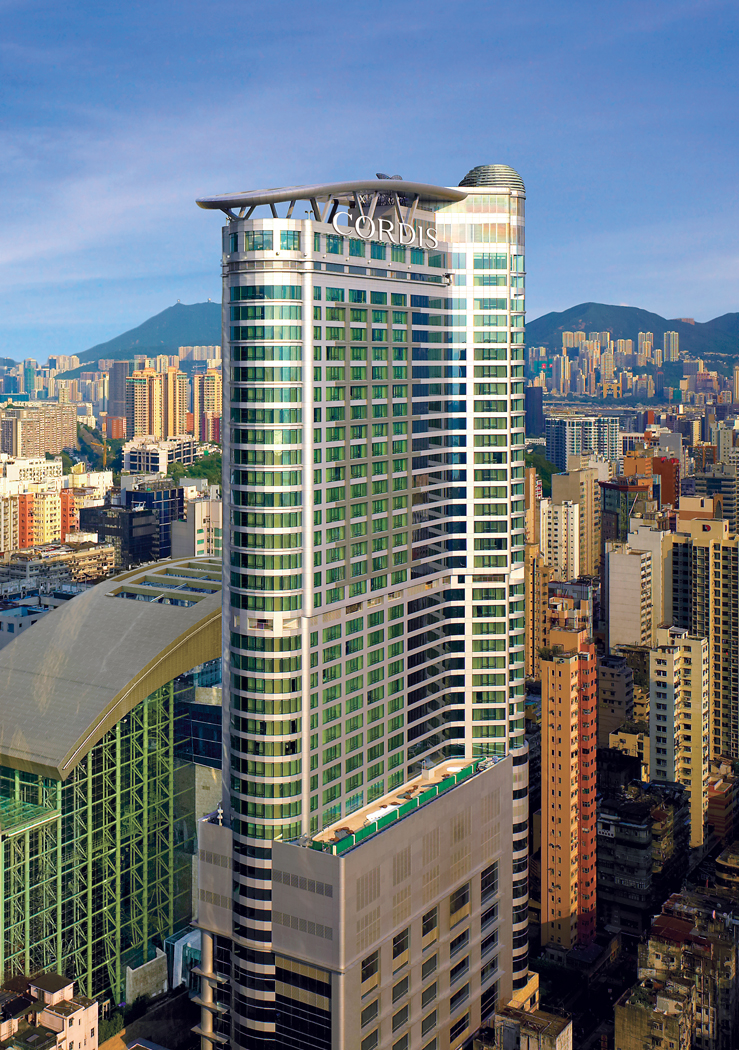
- Cordis, Hong Kong at Langham Place

- Location within Hong Kong urban core

General information
- Location: 555 Shanghai Street, Mong Kok, Hong Kong
- Coordinates: 22°19′5″N 114°10′4″E
- Opened: 4 August 2004; 22 years ago
- Owner: Great Eagle Holdings
- Operator: Langham Hotels International

Technical details
- Floor count: 42

Design and construction
- Developer: Great Eagle Group; Urban Renewal Authority

Other information
- Number of rooms: 664
- Number of suites: 101
- Number of restaurants: 4

Website
- www.cordishotels.com/en/hong-kong/

Cordis, Hong Kong (Chinese: 香港康得思酒店), formerly the Langham Place Hotel (朗豪酒店), is a five star hotel located at 555 Shanghai Street, Mong Kok, Hong Kong. It is operated by Langham Hotels International.

== History ==
The hotel was built as part of an urban renewal project with three main elements: Langham Place shopping centre, hotel, and Langham Place Hotel. It was a joint venture development by the Great Eagle Group and the Urban Renewal Authority (URA).

Started in 1988, the project cost HK$10 billion and was completed in 2004. Several city blocks were demolished to make way for the project, including the old "Bird Street" at Hong Lok Street (雀仔街), home to many grassroots birdsellers.

On 26 August 2015, the Langham Place Hotel was rebranded as the Cordis, Hong Kong.

== Facilities ==
The hotel has 669 guest rooms and four restaurants, including the two-Michelin-starred Chinese restaurant, Ming Court, awarded in the 2009 Hong Kong and Macau edition of the Michelin Guide.

The hotel has a collection of more than 1,500 pieces of contemporary Chinese art, which includes pieces by Wang Guangyi, Yue Minjun and Jiang Shuo.

It was also recognised as a "Best Five Star Hotel" by Travel Weekly Asia Magazine in 2007.

In 2010, Ming Court was listed with the 'Best seafood' and their garoupa and rice in lotus leaf dish as the 'Best Rice' on the Hong Kong Best Eats 2010 list compiled by CNN Travel.

== Viral marketing controversy ==
In order to promote its hotels, the management hired Prosperity Research to produce a series of virals for an Internet social network campaign entitled 'Big Deal'. The videos were criticised for being poorly executed, and for making humour at the expense of local culture. The hotel management in response terminated its relationship with the company after its third video was published, removed the videos and apologised following negative response on Twitter LHI pulled the campaign due to "the potential to magnify the tone in a direction that was not intended." The group said the campaign was a "valuable lesson in communicating cultural differences in the social marketing environment and understanding the power social media holds."
