= Tin Hau Temple Complex, Yau Ma Tei =

Temple in Yau Ma Tei, Kowloon, Hong Kong

Coordinates: 22.30991°N 114.170684°E

Tin Hau Temple Complex
- 油麻地天后廟
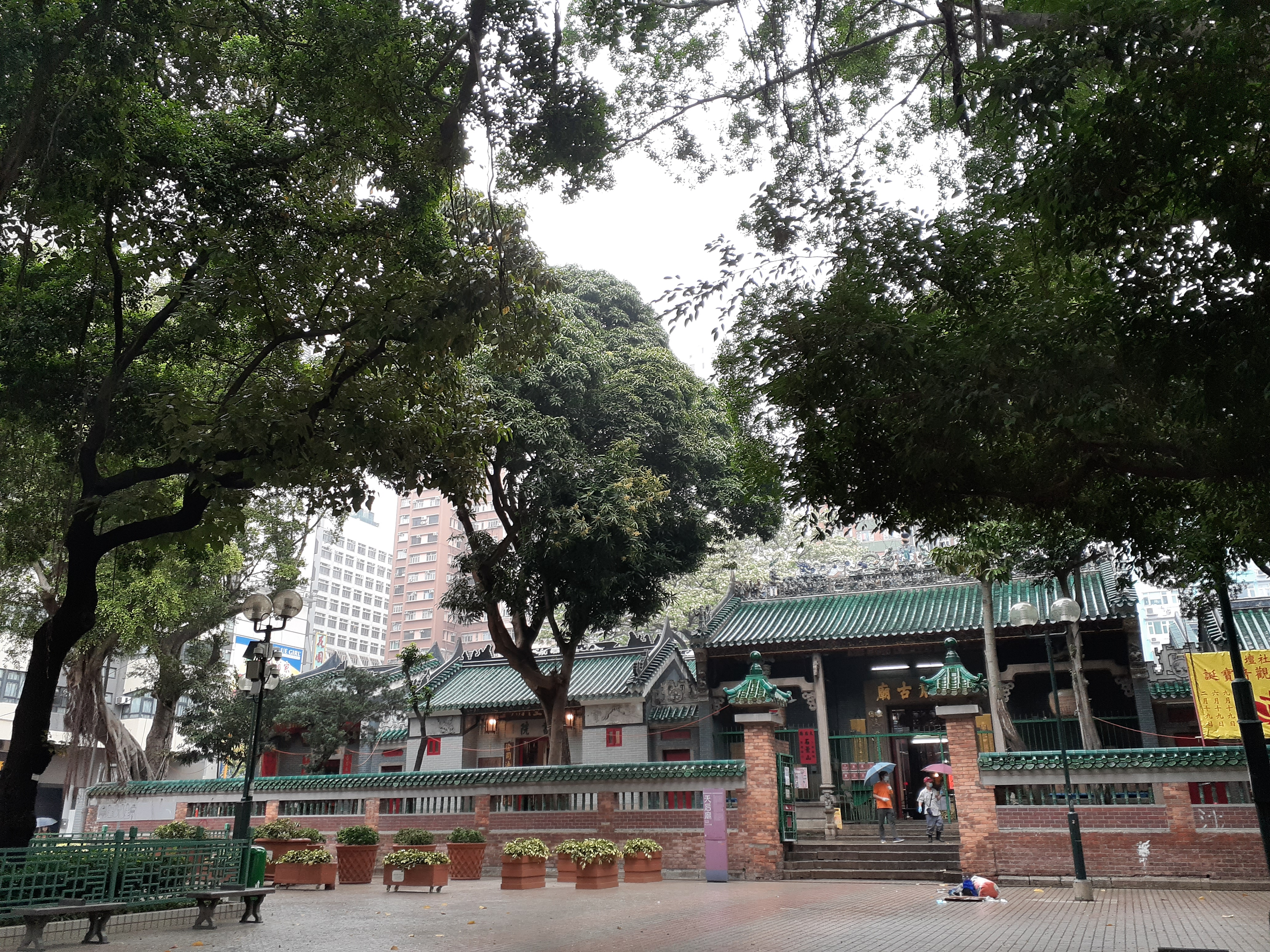
- Entrance of the Tin Hau Temple Complex, viewed from the Yau Ma Tei Community Centre Rest Garden.

Religion
- Affiliation: Chinese folk religion
- District: Yau Tsim Mong
- Region: Hong Kong
- Deity: Tin Hau
- Governing body: Tung Wah Group of Hospitals

Location
- Country: China
- Interactive map of Tin Hau Temple Complex

Architecture
- Established: 1864

Tin Hau Temple Complex, Yau Ma Tei
- Traditional Chinese: 油麻地天后廟
- Simplified Chinese: 油麻地天后庙
- Cantonese Yale: Yàuh màh déi tīn hauh míu
Transcriptions
Standard Mandarin
- Hanyu Pinyin: Yóumádì Tiānhòumiào
Yue: Cantonese
- Yale Romanization: Yàuh màh déi tīn hauh míu
- Jyutping: Jau4 maa4 dei6*2 tin1 hau6 miu6*2

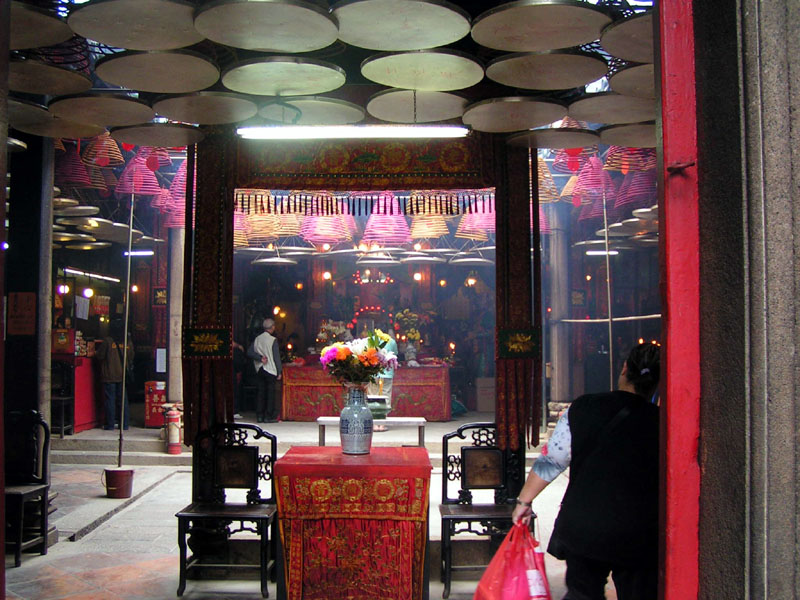
Interior of the Tin Hau Temple.

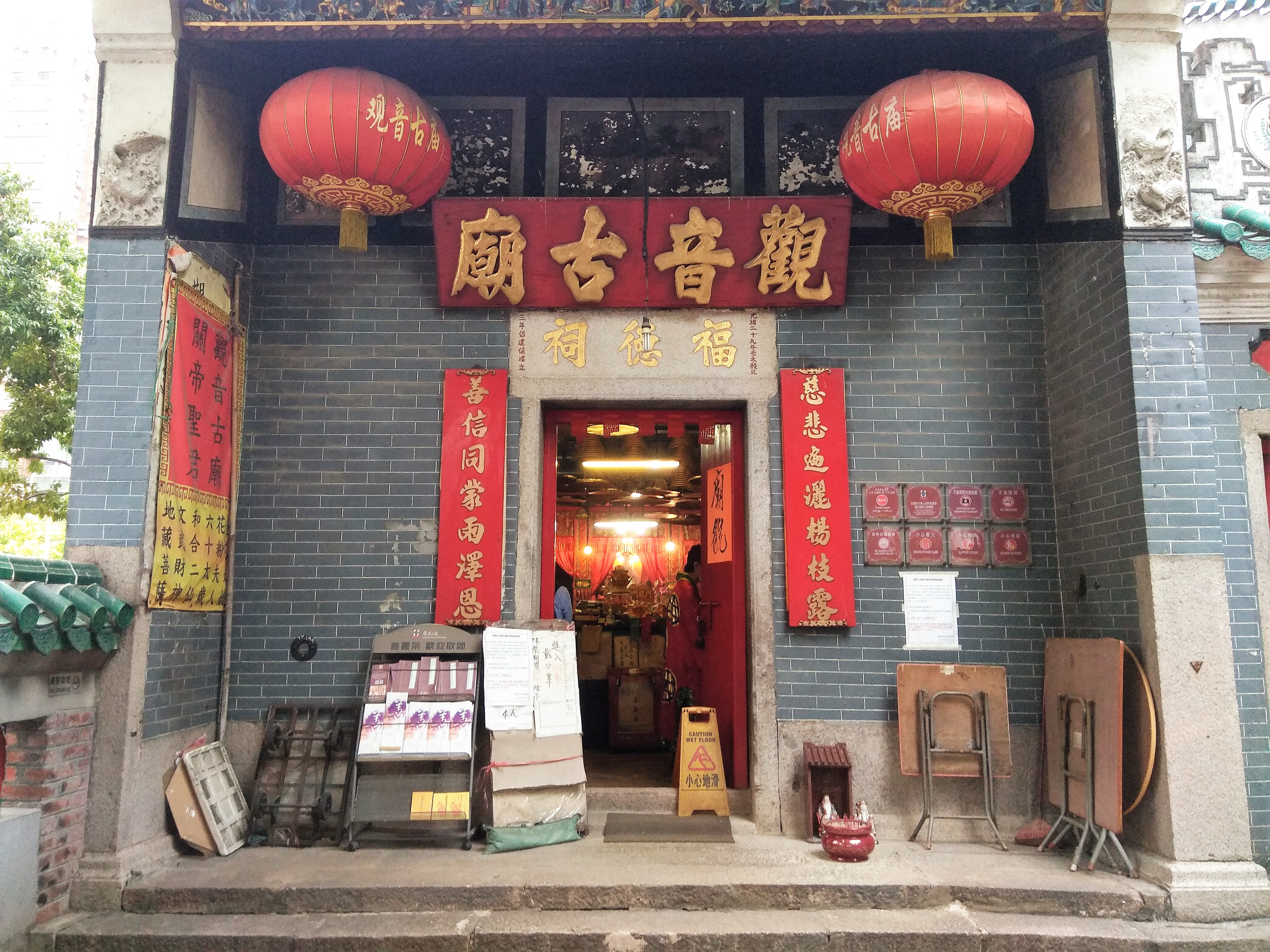
Kwun Yum temple (觀音古廟) in 2020, with the name Fuk Tak Tsz (福德祠) concurrently displayed. Note that both names are written horizontally from right-to-left.

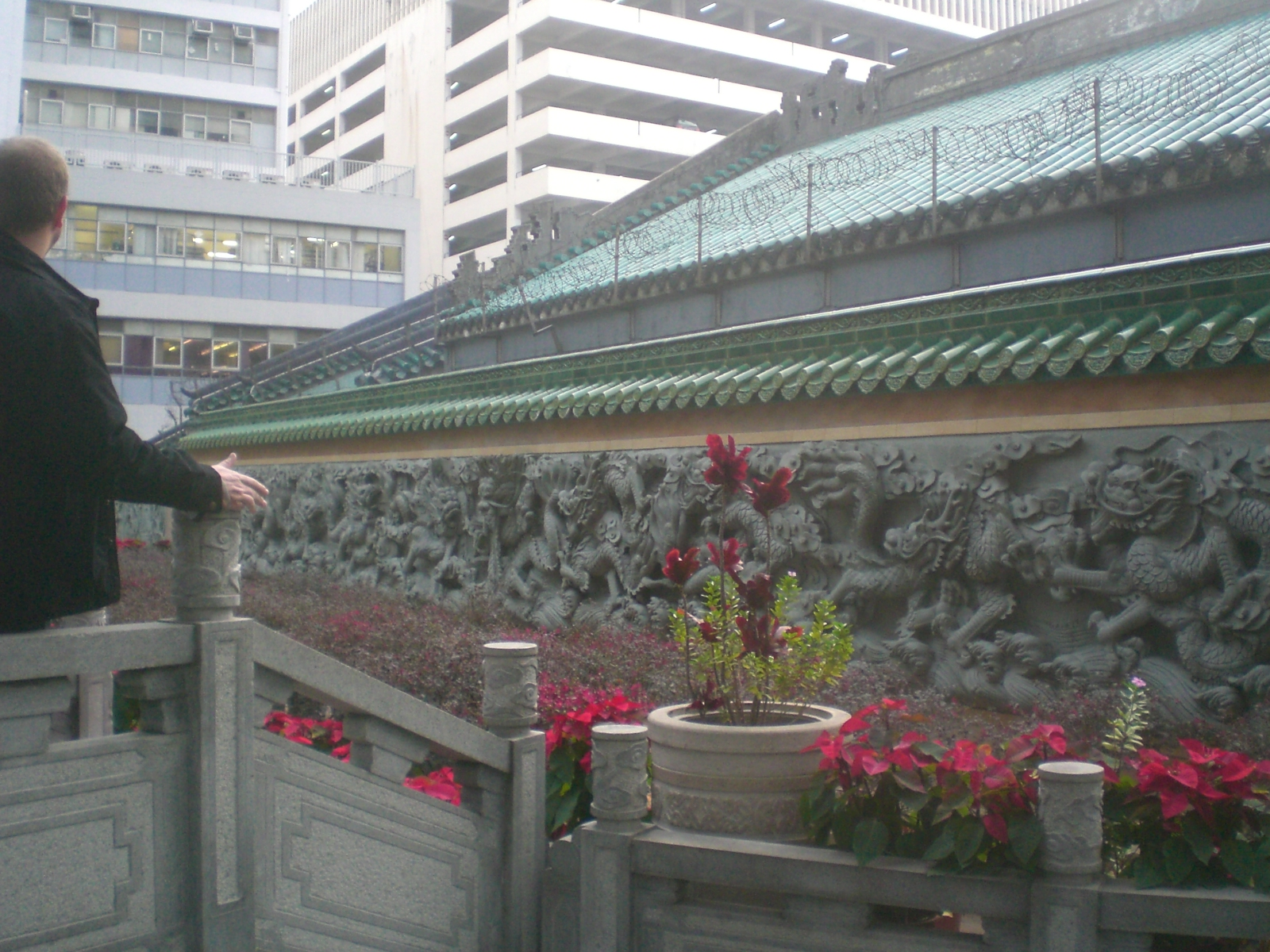
Nine-Dragon Wall in the Public Square Street Rest Garden, at the back of the Temple Complex.

The Tin Hau Temple Complex is a temple in Yau Ma Tei, Kowloon, Hong Kong. It comprises a row of five adjacent buildings: a Tin Hau Temple, a Shing Wong Temple, a Kwun Yum temple, Shea Tan and Hsu Yuen. The nearby Temple Street is named after it.

== Location ==
The Tin Hau Temple Complex is located in Yau Ma Tei, Kowloon. A public square, Yung Shue Tau, occupied by the Yau Ma Tei Community Centre Rest Garden, is located in front of the complex, and is surrounded by the popular Temple Street night market. The northern side of the complex is bordered by Public Square Street. At the back of the Complex (east) is the Public Square Street Children's Playground and Rest Garden, itself located along Nathan Road, the main thoroughfare in Kowloon. The Garden features a Nine-Dragon Wall.

== Features ==
The temple complex comprises five buildings separated by four lanes. From left to right when facing them:

- Kwun Yum temple (觀音古廟), formerly named Fuk Tak Tsz (福德祠). Built in 1894.
- Shing Wong Temple (城隍廟). Built in 1878.
- Tin Hau Temple, the oldest of the temples of the complex
- Kwun Yam Lau She Tan (觀音樓社壇). Built in 1894. Originally a Kung Sor (公所, Communal Hall). Originally dedicated to the District God "She Kung" (社公), other deities were later added. The central Deity of the main altar is Kwun Yum.
- Hsu Yuen (書院). Built in 1897. Disused study hall.

== History ==
The Tin Hau Temple was probably erected at this location in 1864. It originated from a small temple in the present Kwun Chung Market area, that was later moved to the present site by boat people and villagers of Yau Ma Tei. Originally facing the Yau Ma Tei waterfront, it is now almost three kilometers from the shore, as a consequence of land reclamation. The Kung Sor and Hsu Yuen were used until 1955 as a venue for a free school teaching the boat and land people.

== Conservation ==
Before 1914, the temple was managed by the council set up by the merchants in Yau Ma Tei. The temple has been under the management of the Tung Wah Group of Hospitals since 1914, with the transfer of management made official in 1928. The Tin Hau Temple, previously a Grade II historic building since 1987, was listed as a Grade I historic building since June 2000. The Tin Hau Temple and the adjoining buildings were listed as declared monuments in May 2020.

== See also ==
- Tin Hau temples in Hong Kong
- Tin Hau temple, Causeway Bay
- Tin Hau Temple, Joss House Bay
- Hau Kok Tin Hau Temple
