= Temple Street, Hong Kong =

Street in Hong Kong

Coordinates: 22.30589°N 114.16987°E

Temple Street
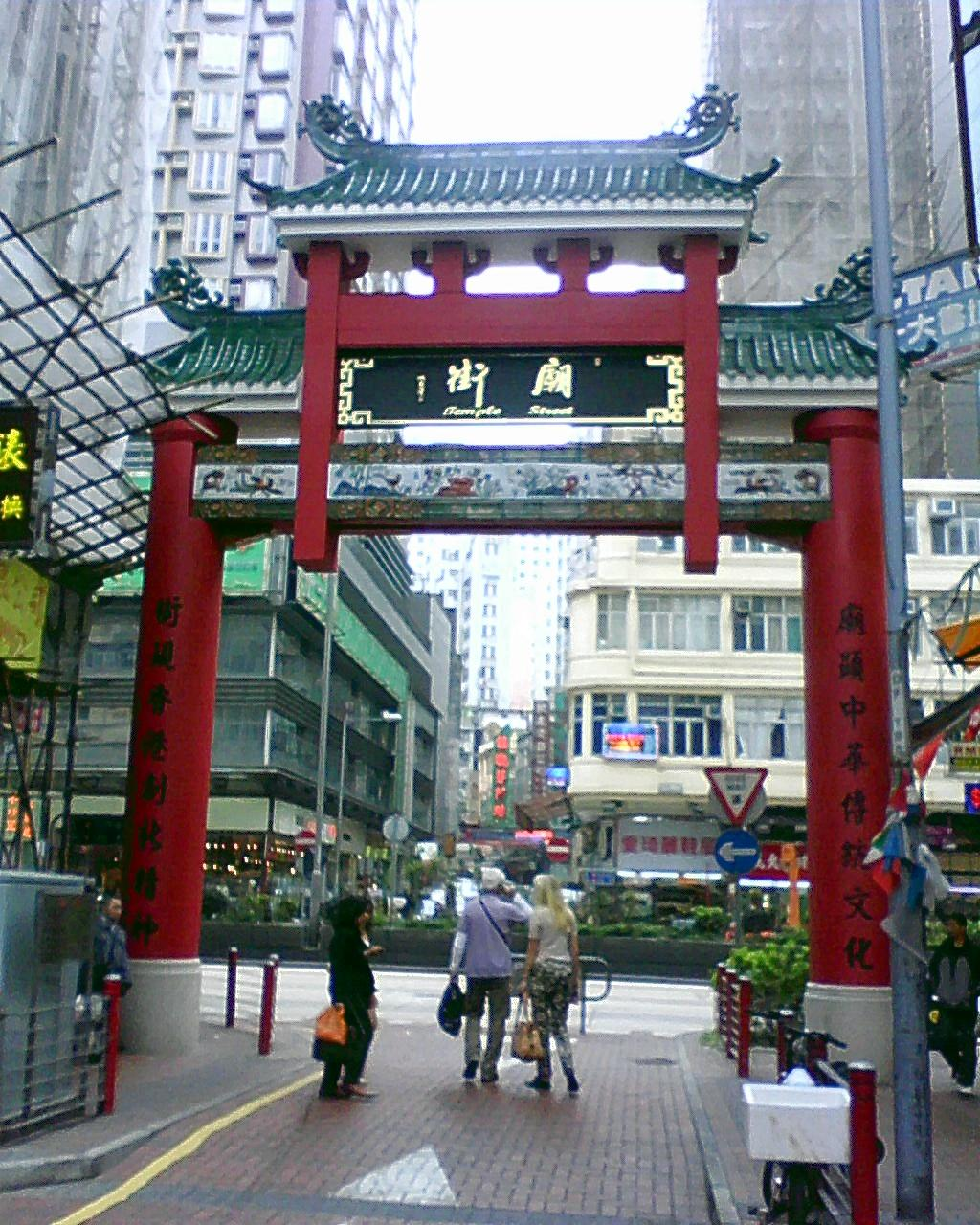
- Gate at the intersection with Jordan Road.
- Interactive map of Temple Street
- Native name: 廟街 (Chinese)
- Namesake: Tin Hau Temple Complex, Yau Ma Tei
- Location: Yau Ma Tei, Hong Kong

Other
- Known for: Temple Street Night Market

Temple Street, Hong Kong
- Traditional Chinese: 廟街
- Simplified Chinese: 庙街
Transcriptions
Standard Mandarin
- Hanyu Pinyin: Miàojiē
Yue: Cantonese
- Yale Romanization: Miuh gāai
- Jyutping: Miu^{6} gaai^{1}

Temple Street (Chinese: 廟街; Jyutping: miu6 gaai1) is a street located in the areas of Jordan and Yau Ma Tei in Kowloon, Hong Kong. It is known for its night market and is one of the busiest flea markets at night in the territory. The night market lies in the Yau Ma Tei, Jordan part of the street. Popular with tourists and locals alike in the evening, it is also common to see the place crowded at dusk. It sells cheap merchandise and food items. The place is sometimes known as "Men's Street".

== History ==
The road was built during the Qing dynasty and was named after the Tin Hau temple which was built on the site.

== Temple Street Night Market ==
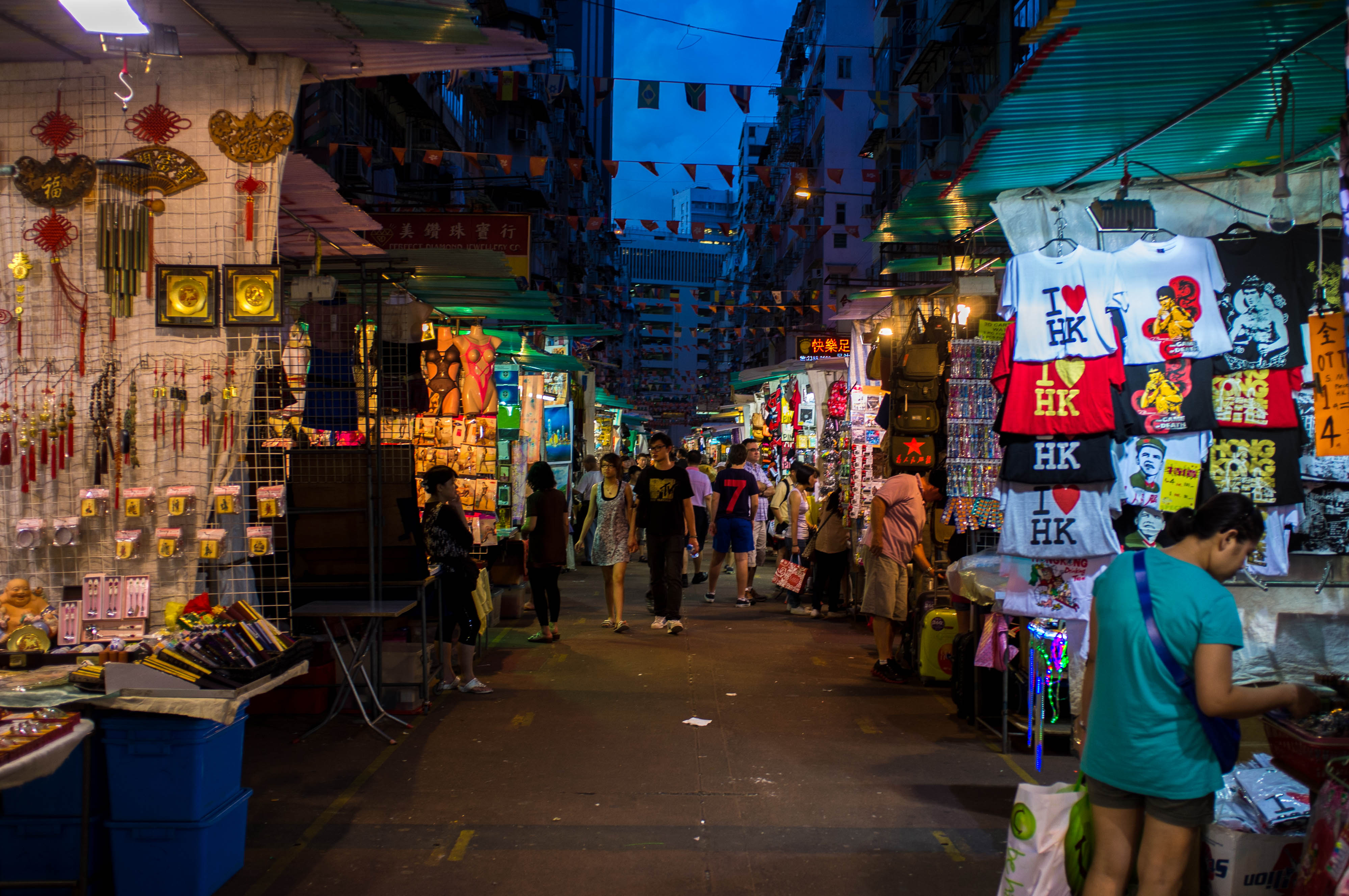
Night Market at Temple Street

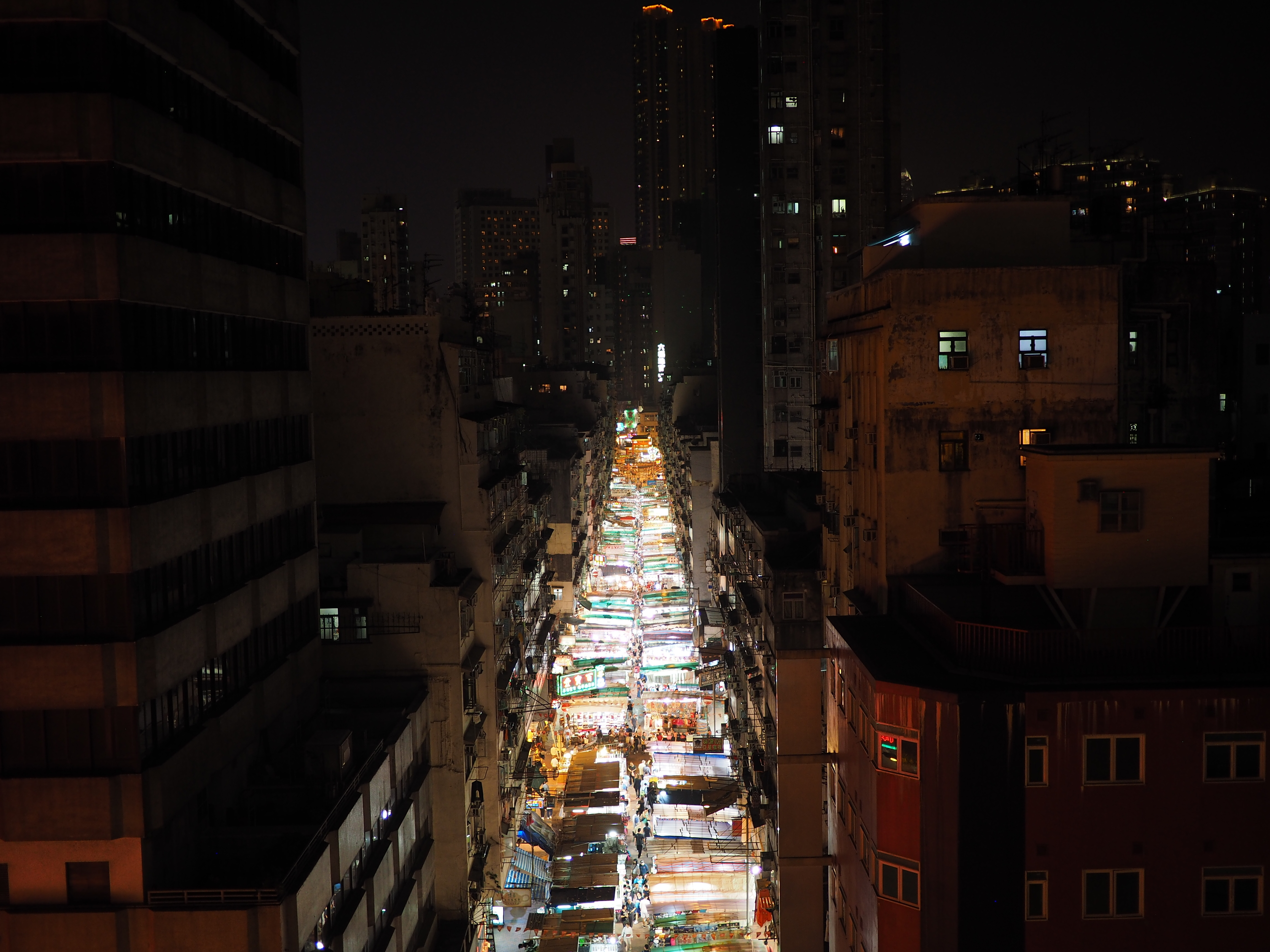
The Temple Street Night Market viewed from above

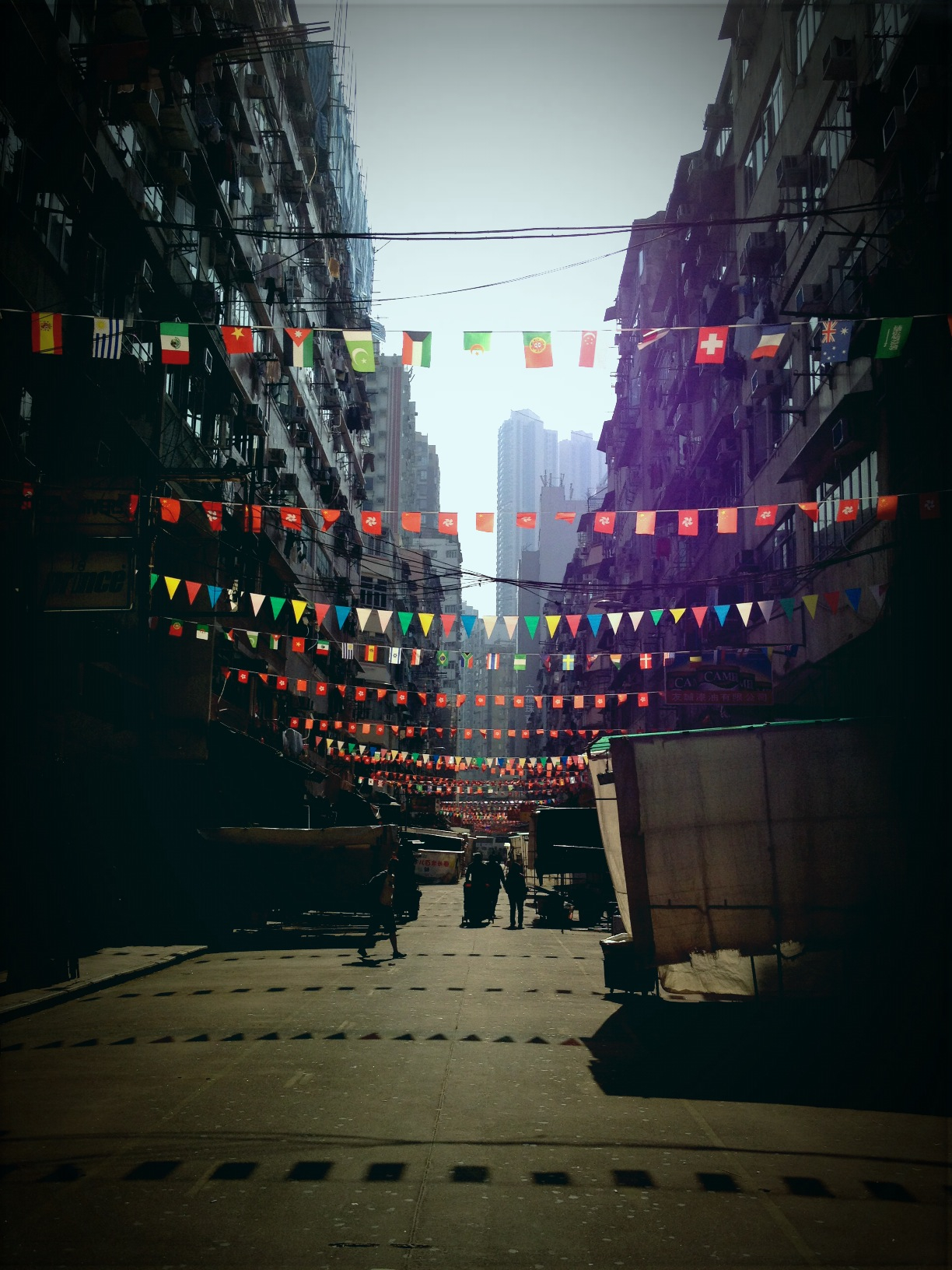
Temple street mid-morning before the stalls are set up

The Temple Street Night Market is sometimes known as Men's Street as it is popular for men's fashion. The market starts at 2 p.m., but is lively at dusk daily. Traffic is closed on the street at that time as visitors swarm into the street. There are more than a hundred stalls with colourful lights in the market. There are carts bulging with goods from clothing to mobile phones and watches. Stalls have items mainly for men, jeans, t-shirts, pants, lighters, shoes and men's accessories. Low-priced merchandise is common in the night market. Cheap second hand goods such as cassettes, video tapes, old newspapers, antiques are also sold there. Like in other night markets in Southeast Asia, prices can always be negotiated by bargaining.

== Clinics ==
Old Chinese clinics exist on this street which employ Traditional Chinese medicine for treating illnesses and diseases. They are known as TCM physicians (dubbed the "Masters") and many have run these clinics for many years.

== Food and beverage ==
The night market is famous for its snacks and roadside dining, which serves local street cuisine. It sells a wide range of delicious local delicacies.

There are also many restaurants selling seafood. These rice hot pots can be perfect for an intimate dinner. They are delicious as well as affordable. All of these culinary delicacies represent Hong Kong's traditional and unique food culture.

== Temple Street Festival ==
During September 2003, the inaugural Temple Street Festival was organised and was supported by the Home Affairs Bureau and the Hong Kong Tourism Board.

== Transport ==
The nearest MTR stations to Temple Street are Jordan station Exit A in ten minutes and Yau Ma Tei station Exit C one minute.

== In popular culture ==
The unique characteristics of Temple Street make it a desirable location for filming. It is often used as a setting to portray all walks of life in Hong Kong. Also, many gangster films depict the place as a street of crime. The place is featured in films such as Queen of Temple Street (1990), The Prince of Temple Street (1992) and Mean Street Story (廟街故事, 1995).

Temple Street also plays a prominent role in the Stephen Chow film The God of Cookery, the Fiona Sit series C'est La Vie, Mon Chéri, and the TVB series Street Fighters (廟街·媽·兄弟) which starred Hacken Lee and Edmond Leung.

== See also ==
- Tin Hau Temple Complex, Yau Ma Tei
- Mido Cafe
- Ladies' Market
- List of places in Hong Kong
- Temple Street, Singapore
- List of streets and roads in Hong Kong
