= Citybus Route 20 =

Bus route in Hong Kong

20
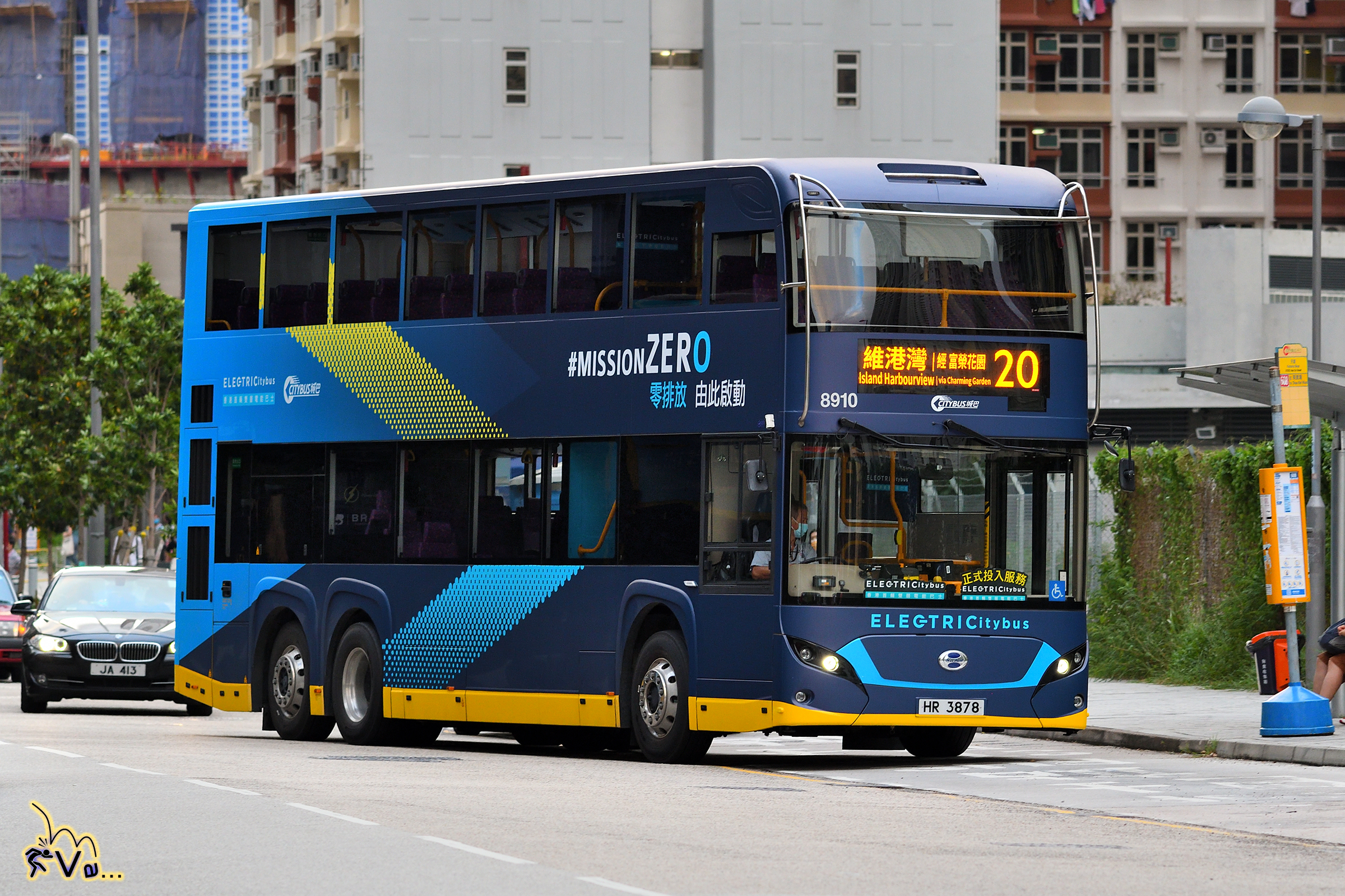

Overview
- Operator: Citybus
- Garage: Tuen Mun Depot
- Vehicle: Alexander Dennis Enviro500 MMC 12.8m

Route
- Start: Kai Tak (Muk On Street)
- Via: Kai Ching Estate; San Po Kong; Kowloon City; Kowloon Hospital; Yau Ma Tei; Tai Kok Tsui
- End: Cheung Sha Wan (Hoi Tat)

Service
- Level: 05:40 until 00:20
- Alt. level: 05:35 until 00:15
- Frequency: 12–30 minutes
- Journey time: to Cheung Sha Wan: 39mins to Kai Tak: 49mins

Kowloon Urban Route No. 20 is a Hong Kong bus route operated by Citybus, plying between Kai Tak (Muk On Street) and Cheung Sha Wan (Hoi Tat).

This route was introduced in April 2018 in conjunction with population intake in the Kai Tak Development. It is the first intra-Kowloon franchised bus route operated by Citybus, which obtained the right to operate this route through a tendering exercise.

== History ==
Population growth in the Kai Tak Development Area, which was redeveloped from the former Hong Kong International Airport, resulted in increased travelling demand to and from the district. Transport Department thus proposed the introduction of three new bus route serving the new development in the Bus Route Planning Programme 2017-2018. It was envisaged that the one serving between Kai Tak and Island Harbourview in Tai Kok Tsui would improve the linkage between the areas of Tai Kok Tsui, Yau Ma Tei, Argyle Street and Kai Tak.

The Transport Department invited franchised bus companies to submit proposals on operating the three routes. In April 2018 Citybus was announced as the successful tenderer of these three routes. The route thus has the significance of being the first intra-Kowloon franchised bus route ever operated by Citybus.

The route, numbered 20, commenced service on 29 April 2018, the first among the three routes being tendered.

Starting from 23 April 2023, route 20 has extended from Tai Kok Tsui (Island Harbourview) to Hoi Tat Estate, after following the original routing to Sham Mong Road near Harbour Green, continue to run straight along Sham Mong Road then via Hoi Tat Street to the new terminus, no longer observing Hoi Fai Road and Hoi Fan Road.

== Route ==
Route 20 operates via these primary locations:

- Kai Tak (Muk On Street)
- Tak Long Estate / Kai Ching Estate
- San Po Kong
- Kowloon City
- Kowloon Hospital
- Kwong Wah Hospital
- Yau Ma Tei station
- Yau Ma Tei Fruit Market
- Charming Garden
- Olympic station / Olympian City
- Nam Cheong station
- Cheung Sha Wan (Hoi Tat Estate)

== See also ==
- List of bus routes in Hong Kong
