= Dundas Street (disambiguation) =

Dundas Street is a major historic arterial road in Ontario, Canada.

Dundas Street may also refer to:

- Ontario Highway 2, sections of which have been renamed "Dundas Street"
- Dundas Street, Edinburgh, a street in New Town, Edinburgh, Scotland
- Dundas Street, Hong Kong, a street between Mong Kok and Yau Ma Tei, Kowloon
