= Route 20 (disambiguation) =

Route 20 refers to highways numbered 20.

Route 20 may also refer to:

- Route 20 (MTA Maryland), a bus route in Baltimore, Maryland and its suburbs
- Citybus Route 20 in Hong Kong
- London Buses route 20

== See also ==
- Line 20 (disambiguation)
