= Line 20 =

Line 20 may refer to:

- Line 20 (Beijing Subway), in China (planned)
- Line 20 (Guangzhou Metro), in China (future)
- Line 20 (São Paulo Metro), in Brazil (planned)
- Line 20 (Shanghai Metro), in China (under construction)
- Line 20 (Shenzhen Metro), in China

== See also ==
- Route 20 (disambiguation)
