= Yau Ma Tei Typhoon Shelter =

Typhoon shelter in Hong Kong

Coordinates: 22.3099°N 114.1570°E

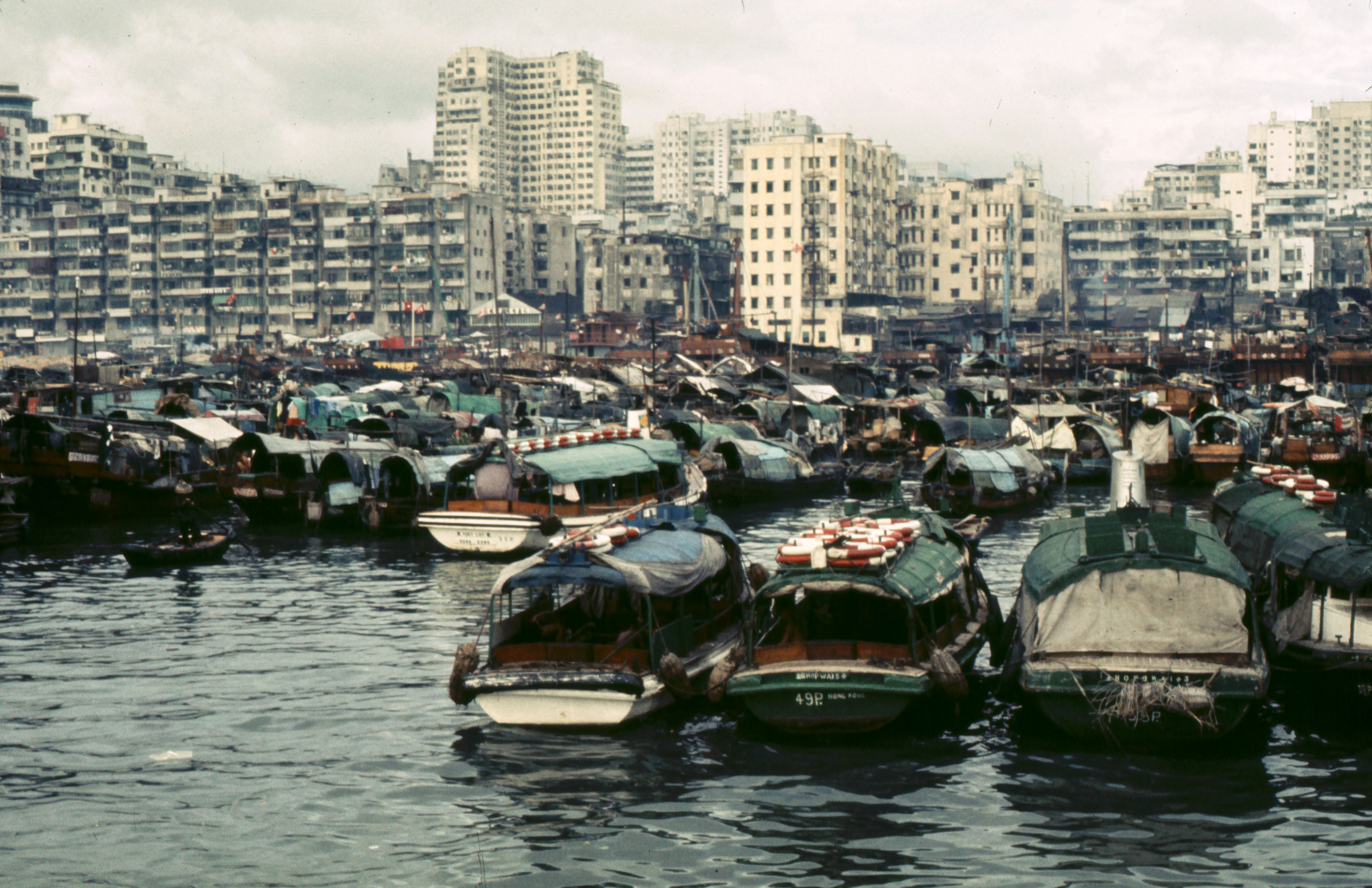
Original Yau Ma Tei typhoon shelter in the 1970s.

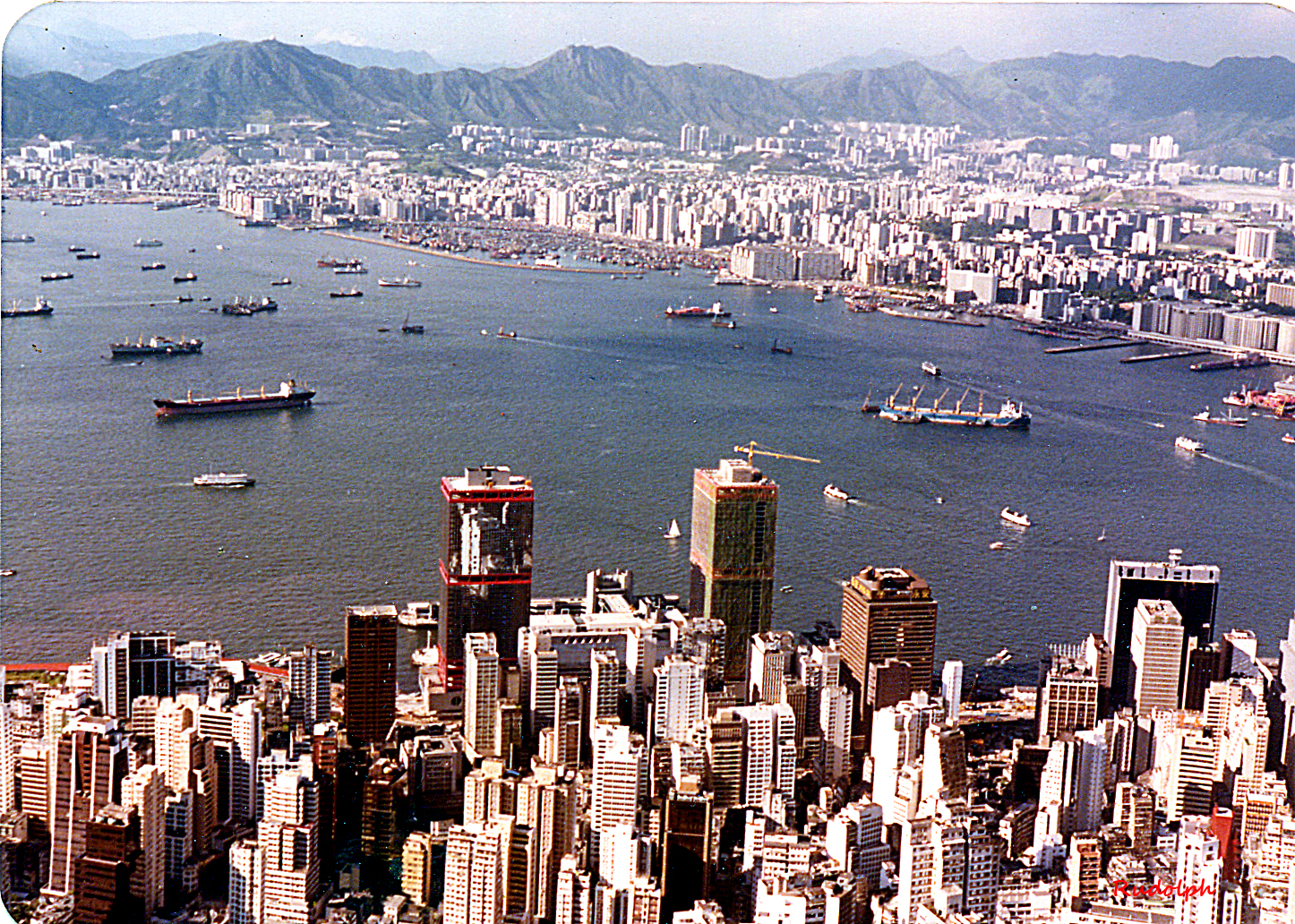
Original Yau Ma Tei typhoon shelter (visible in the background) in 1985.

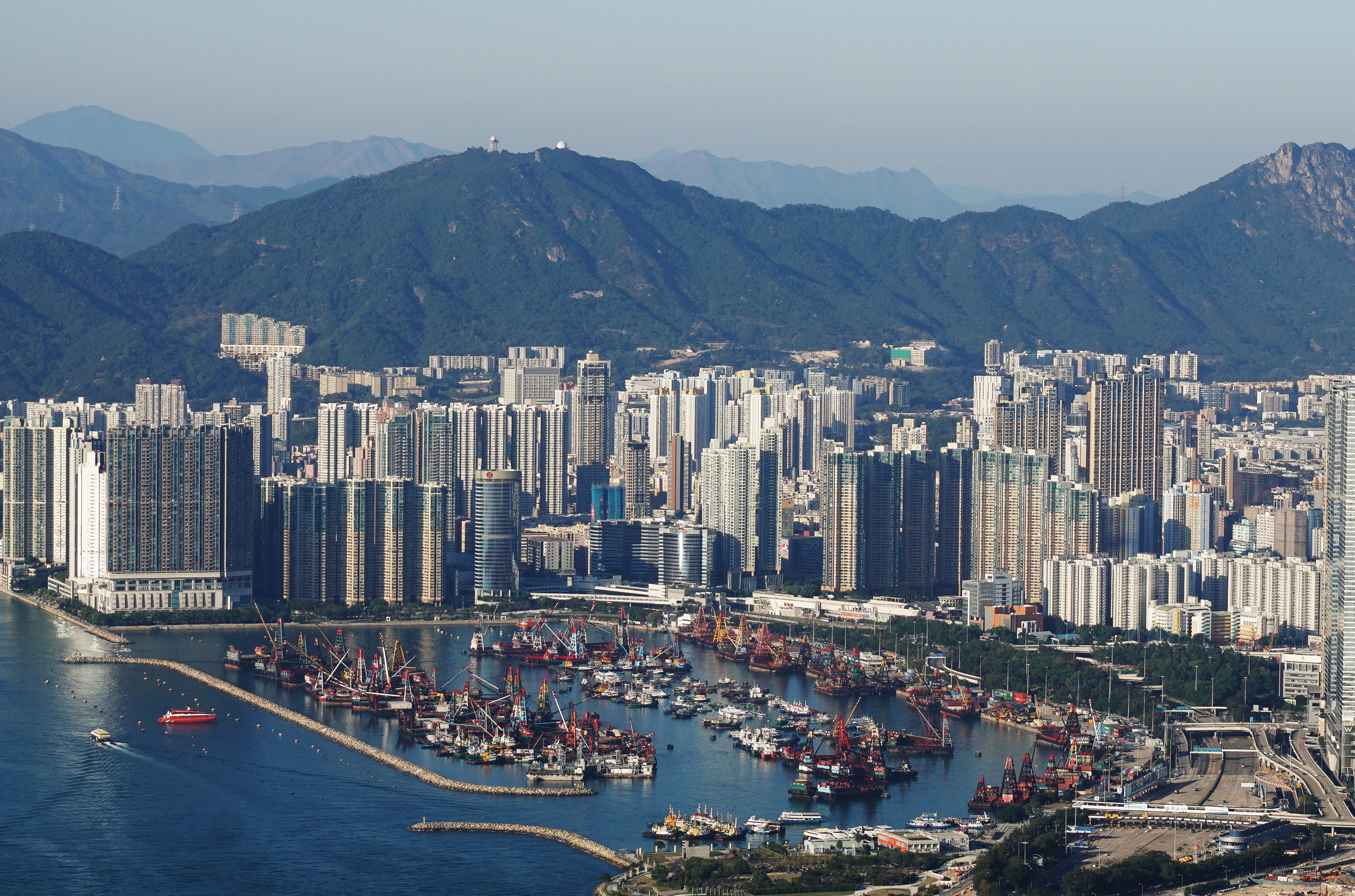
New Yau Ma Tei Typhoon Shelter in 2016.

Yau Ma Tei Typhoon Shelter (Chinese: 油麻地避風塘) is a typhoon shelter located near Yau Ma Tei, Kowloon, Hong Kong. The original shelter was replaced during the West Kowloon Reclamation project in the 1990s by a new one farther west, officially named the New Yau Ma Tei Typhoon Shelter (新油麻地避風塘).

== History ==
The Government of Hong Kong planned for the construction of a second typhoon shelter after (the old) Causeway Bay Typhoon Shelter in late 1906. In 1908 the Public Works Department decided to construct the typhoon shelter at Yau Ma Tei. Works on the typhoon shelter lasted from 1910 to 1915. The cost was HK$2.21 million. The typhoon shelter was officially opened by Sir Francis Henry May, then Governor of Hong Kong, on 16 December 1915.

The Yau Ma Tei Boat People settled in the shelter from around 1916 to 1990.

The West Kowloon Reclamation Project began in 1990 as part of the Airport Core Programme, which required a replacement for the original typhoon shelter. The new typhoon shelter was built to the west of the original one, and was completed in 1992.

Housing estates built on the reclaimed land of the initial typhoon shelter include: Park Avenue, Charming Garden and Hoi Fu Court.

To improve the water quality of the typhoon shelter, construction of dry weather flow interceptor at Cherry Street box culvert started on 19 December 2017, and it is expected to be completed at the end of 2022.

== See also ==
- 1908 Hong Kong typhoon
- List of typhoon shelters in Hong Kong
