= Yau Ma Tei Fruit Market =

Wholesale fruit market in Hong Kong

Coordinates: 22.3122°N 114.1682°E

- 油麻地果欄
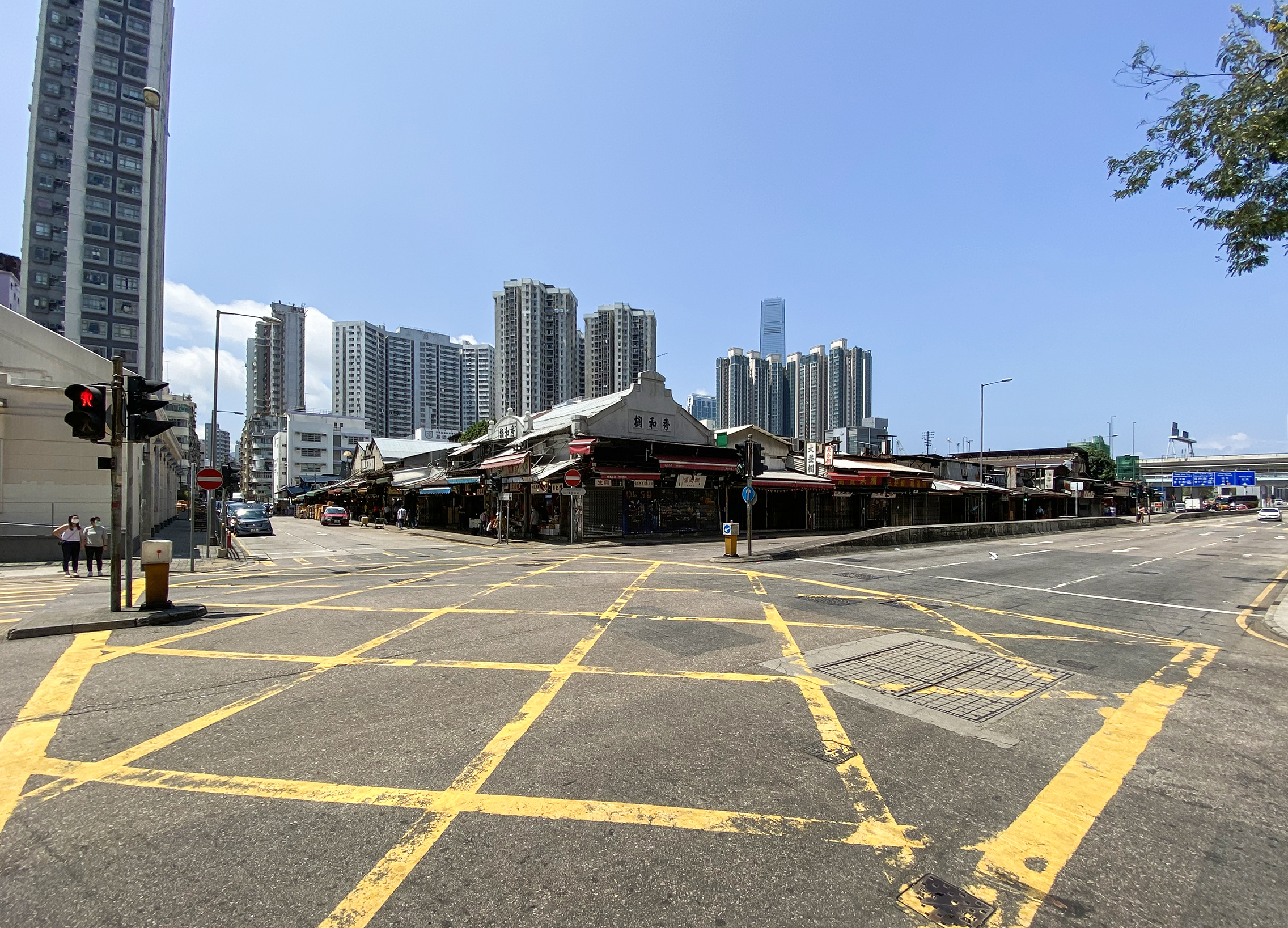
- Yaumatei Fruit Market, corner of Reclamation Street and Waterloo Road.
- Interactive map of the Yau Ma Tei Fruit Market area

General information
- Type: Marketplace
- Location: Yau Ma Tei, Kowloon, 202 Reclamation Street, Hong Kong
- Opened: 1913; 113 years ago

Design and construction
- Designations: Grade II Historic Building

Yau Ma Tei Fruit Market
- Traditional Chinese: 油麻地果欄
- Simplified Chinese: 油麻地果栏
Transcriptions
Standard Mandarin
- Hanyu Pinyin: Yóumádì Guǒlán
Yue: Cantonese
- Yale Romanization: Yàuh màah déi gwó lāan
- Jyutping: Jau4 maa4 dei6*2 gwo2 laan4*1

The Yau Ma Tei Fruit Market, officially Yau Ma Tei Wholesale Fruit Market, also simply known as the Fruit Market, is a wholesale fruit market in Yau Ma Tei, Kowloon, Hong Kong.

== Etymology ==
It is known as gwo laan (果欄) in Cantonese. gwo (果) means fruit while laan (欄) means wholesale market, derived from railing and enclosed area.

== History ==
The market was founded in 1913 between Ferry Street, Waterloo Road and Reclamation Street with Shek Lung Street passing through it. The name of the market was originally Government Vegetables Market (政府蔬菜市場) which sold fruit and vegetables. Fish traders joined in the 1930s. With the opening of Cheung Sha Wan Vegetables Wholesaling Market (長沙灣蔬菜批發市場) and Cheung Sha Wan Fishery Wholesaling Market (長沙灣魚類批發市場) in Cheung Sha Wan in 1965, the vegetables and fish stalls moved out. From then on the market has operated as a specialist fruit wholesaling market. The market was then officially known as Kowloon Wholesale Fruit Market until the name was transferred to Cheung Sha Wan Wholesale Market Complex in 1990.

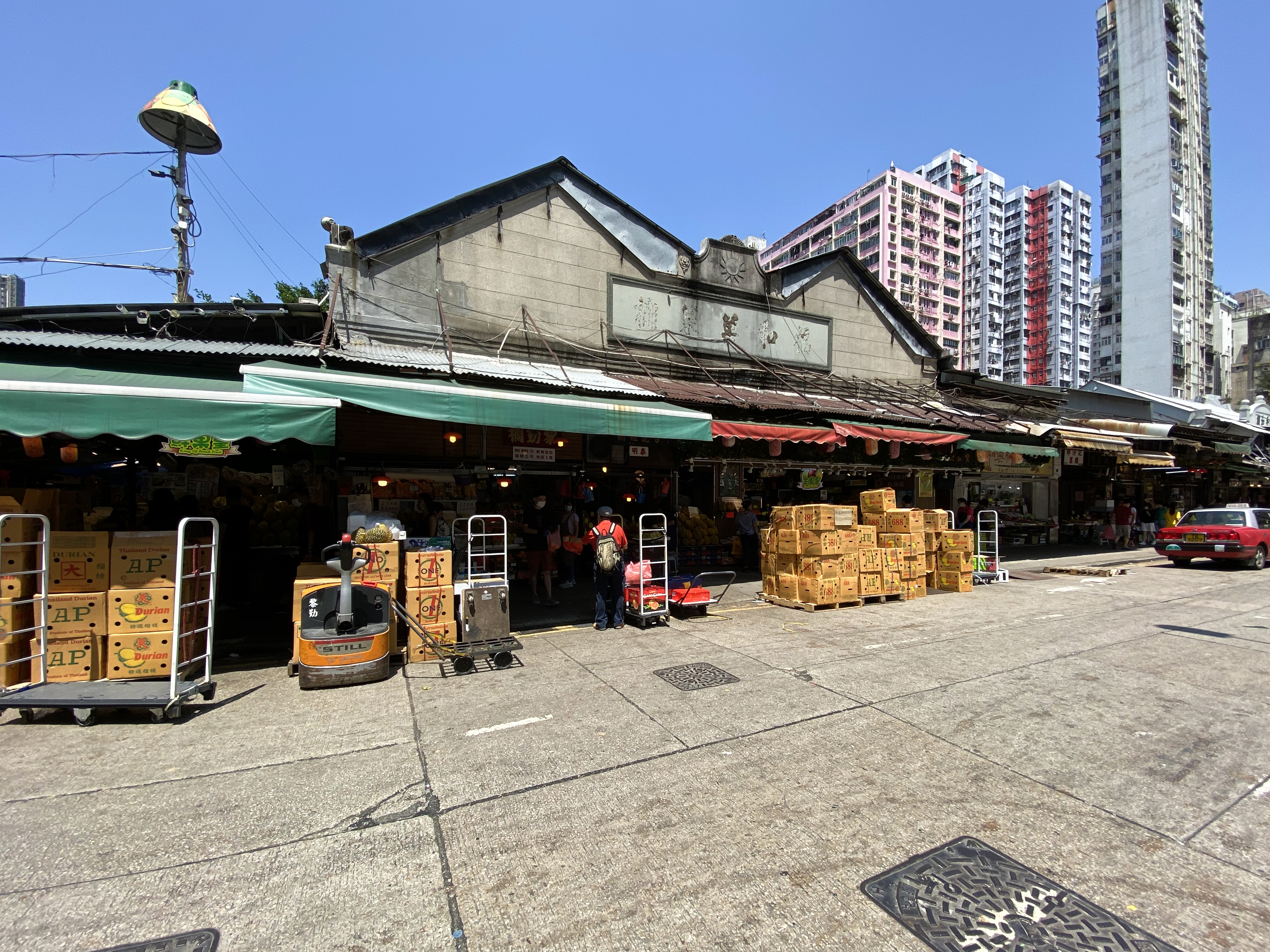
Detail of a building along Reclamation Street

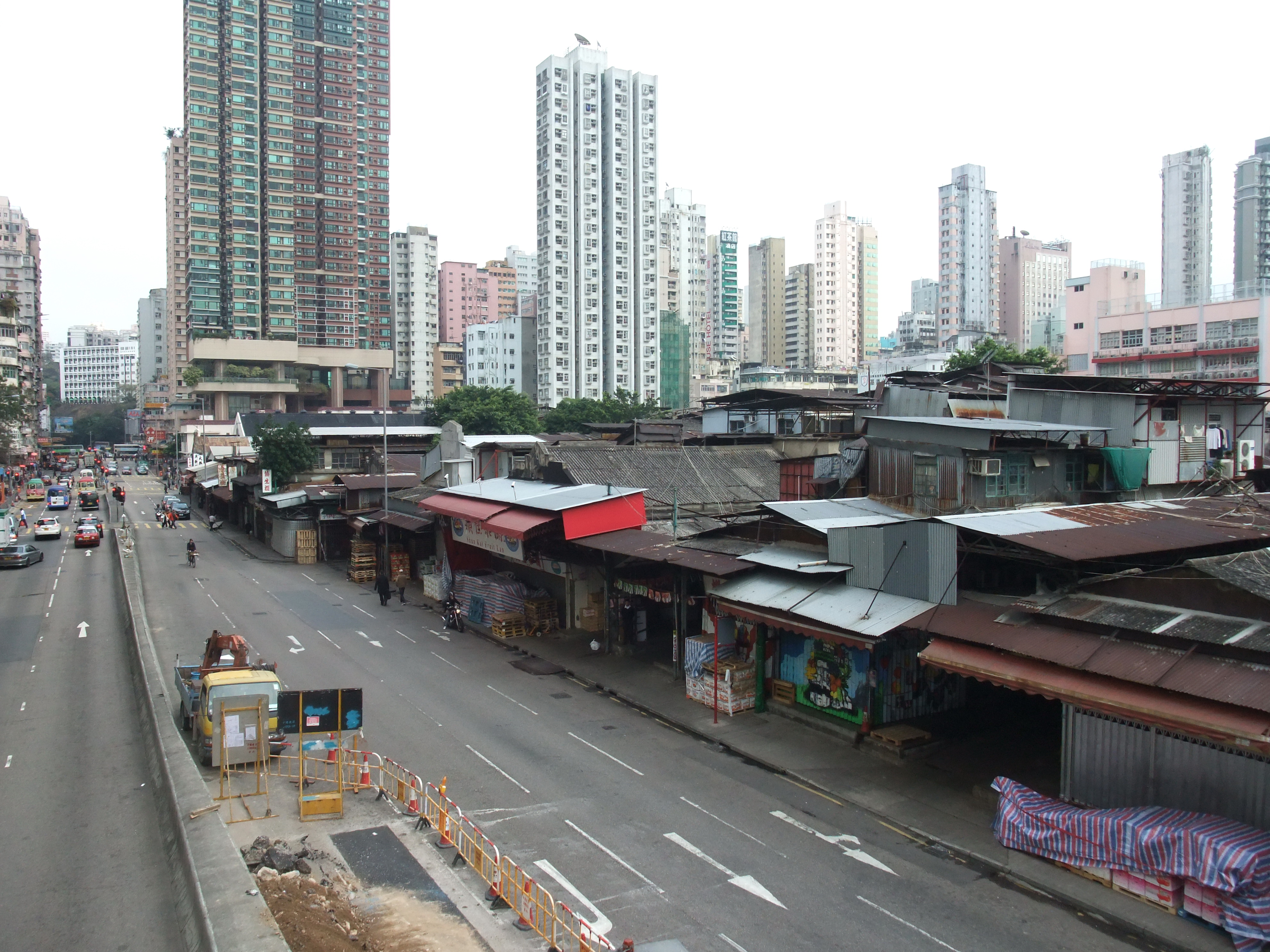
Yau Ma Tei Fruit Market, along Waterloo Road

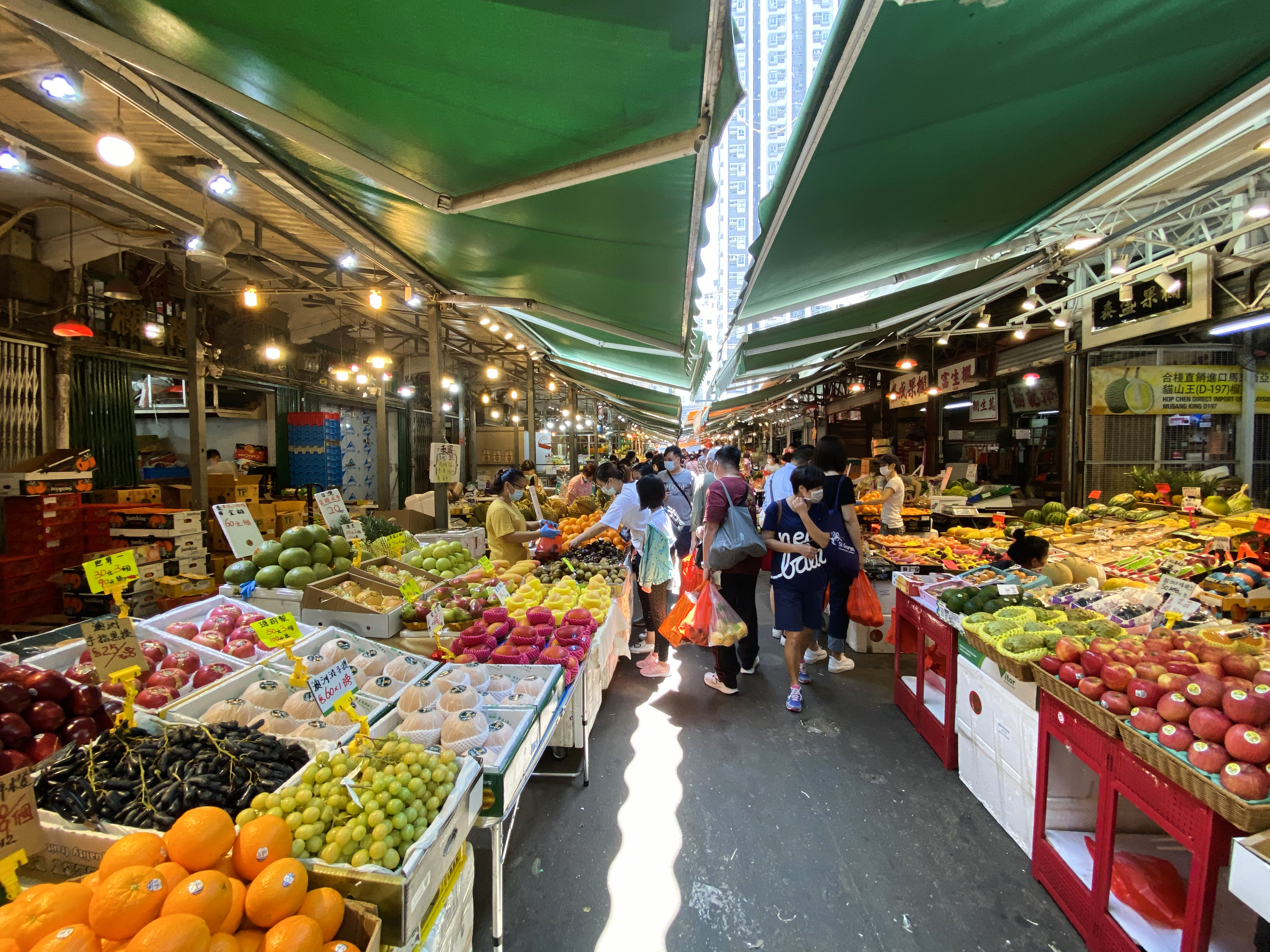
Fruit Stand

== Features ==
The market is a historically valuable site and is classified as a Grade II Historic Building since 2009. It consists of several blocks of one or two storey brick and stone buildings. Pre-World War II signboards are on the outer walls of the buildings.

Another historical building, Yau Ma Tei Theatre is adjacent to the market, across Reclamation Street.

== Market operation ==
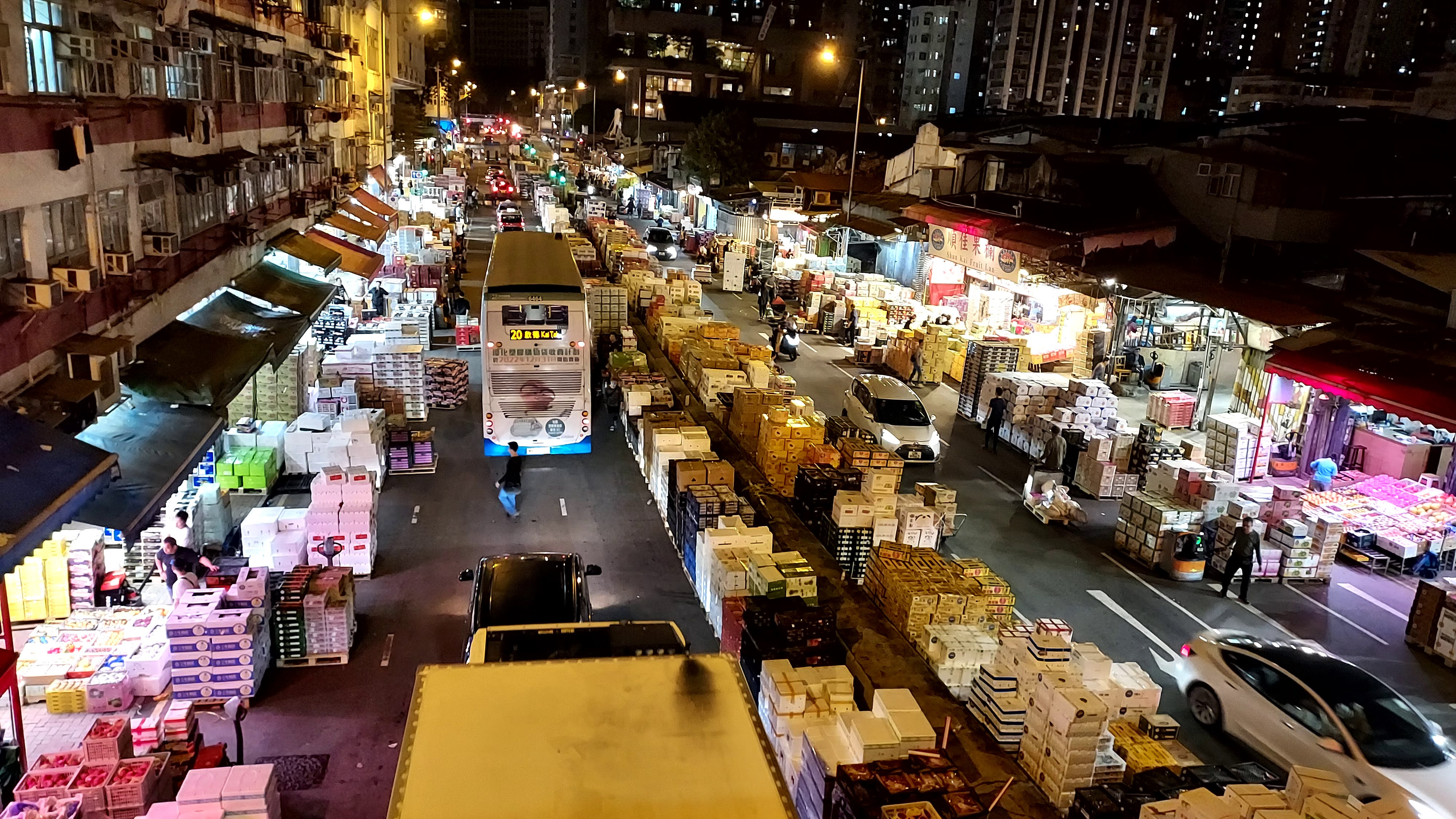
Market at night

Many wholesalers still operate in the market. The busiest hours are 4 to 6 o'clock in the morning. Lorries and carts deliver boxes of fruit in and out of the market.

== Transportation ==
- Yau Ma Tei station Exit B2
- KMB Route 10 and Citybus Route 20

== In popular culture ==
Yau Ma Tei Fruit Market is used as a backdrop for 2018 TVB drama series Apple-Colada.

In the 2024 martial arts action film Twilight of the Warriors: Walled In, a fictionalized Yau Ma Tei Fruit Market is controlled by the crime lord, Mr. Big.
