= Waterloo Road, Hong Kong =

Road in Hong Kong

Waterloo Road
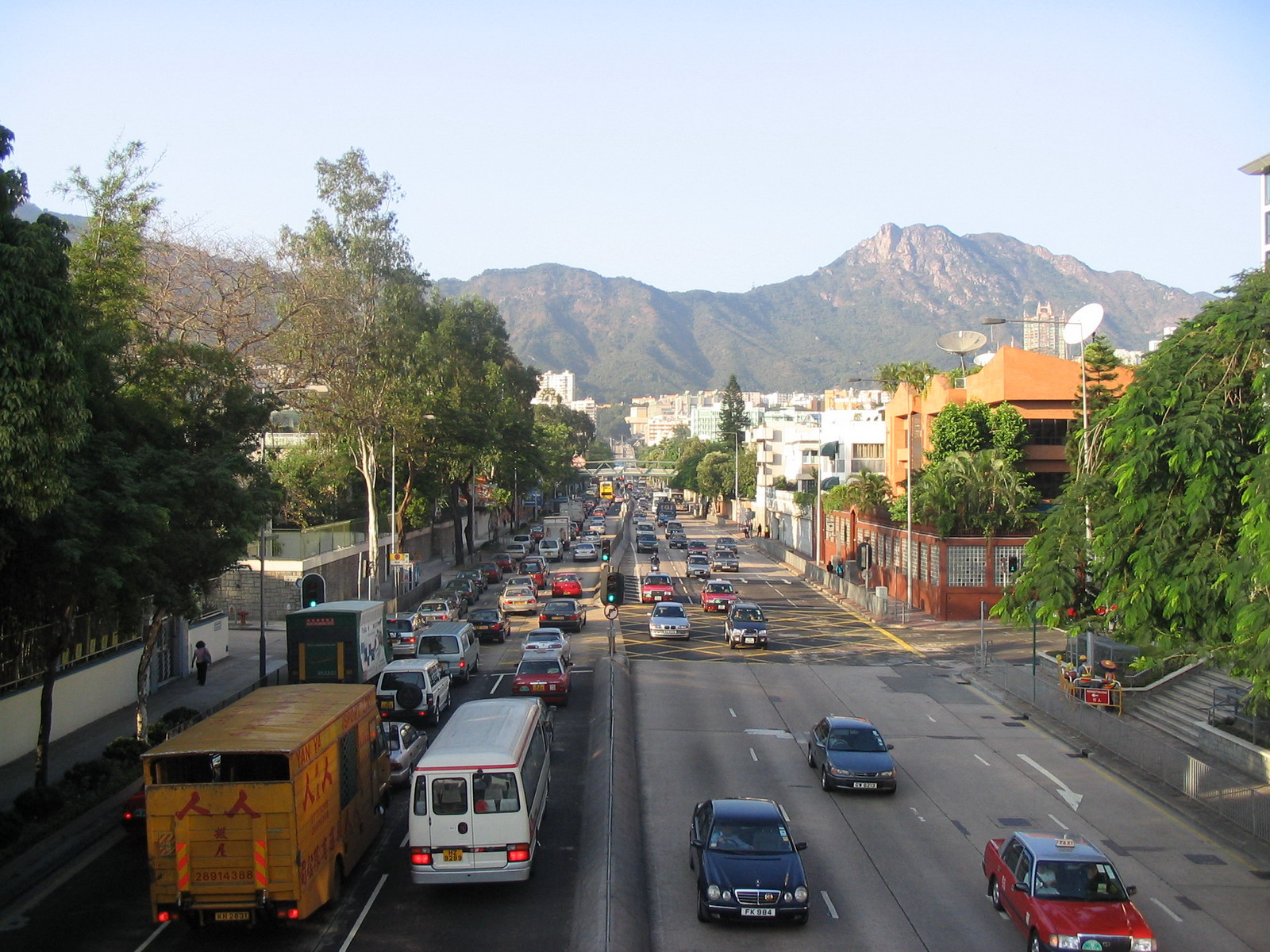
- Waterloo Road in Kowloon Tong, with Lion Rock in the background
- Interactive map of Waterloo Road
- Native name: 窩打老道 (Yue Chinese)
- Part of: Route 1
- Namesake: Battle of Waterloo
- Length: 4.8 km (3.0 mi)
- South end: Princess Margaret Road
- North end: Lion Rock Tunnel

Construction
- Inauguration: Early 20th century

Waterloo Road, Hong Kong
- Chinese: 窩打老道
- Jyutping: wo1 daa2 lou5 dou6
Transcriptions
Standard Mandarin
- Hanyu Pinyin: Wōdǎlǎo Dào
Yue: Cantonese
- Jyutping: wo1 daa2 lou5 dou6

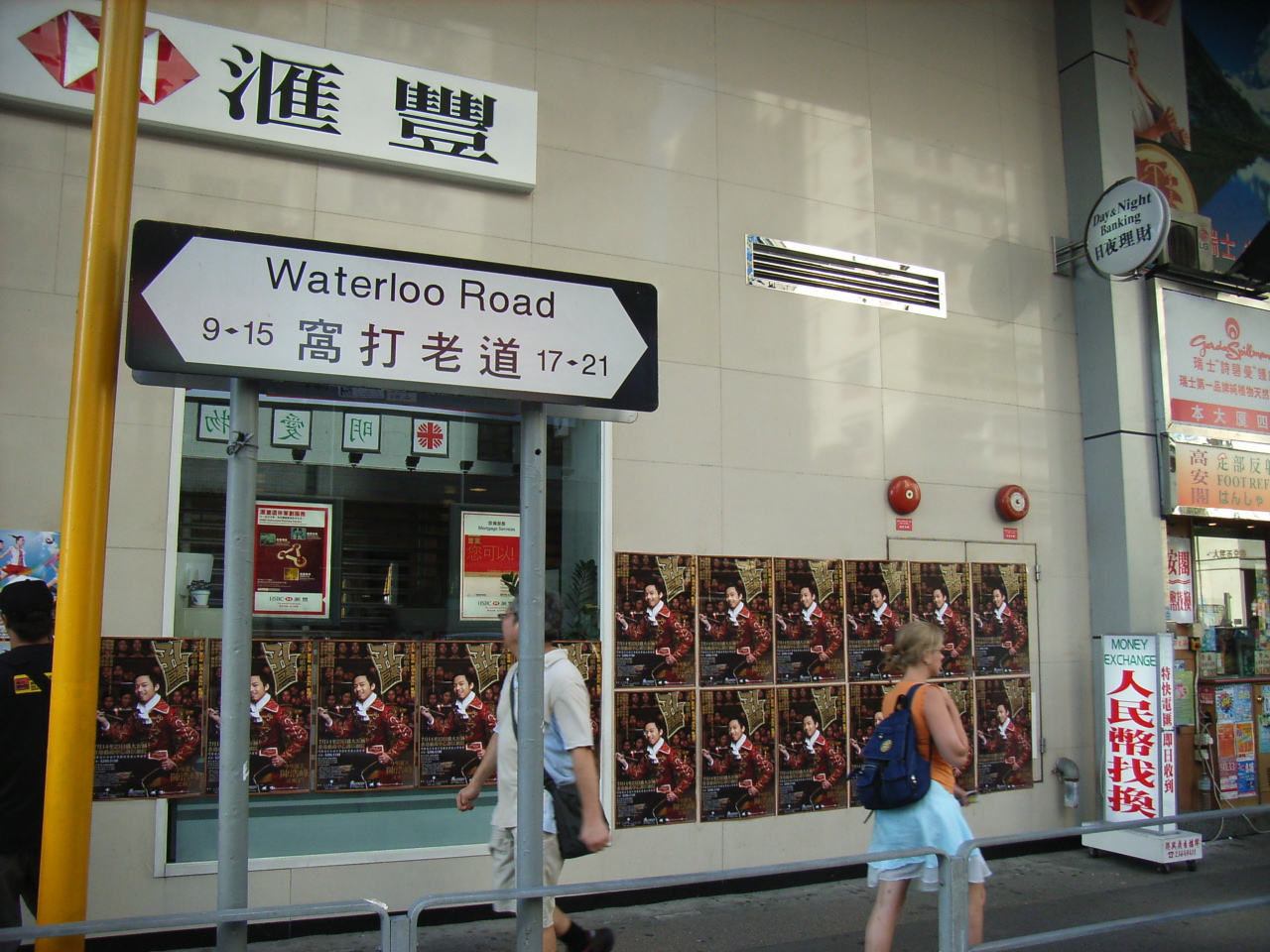
Waterloo Road near Yau Ma Tei.

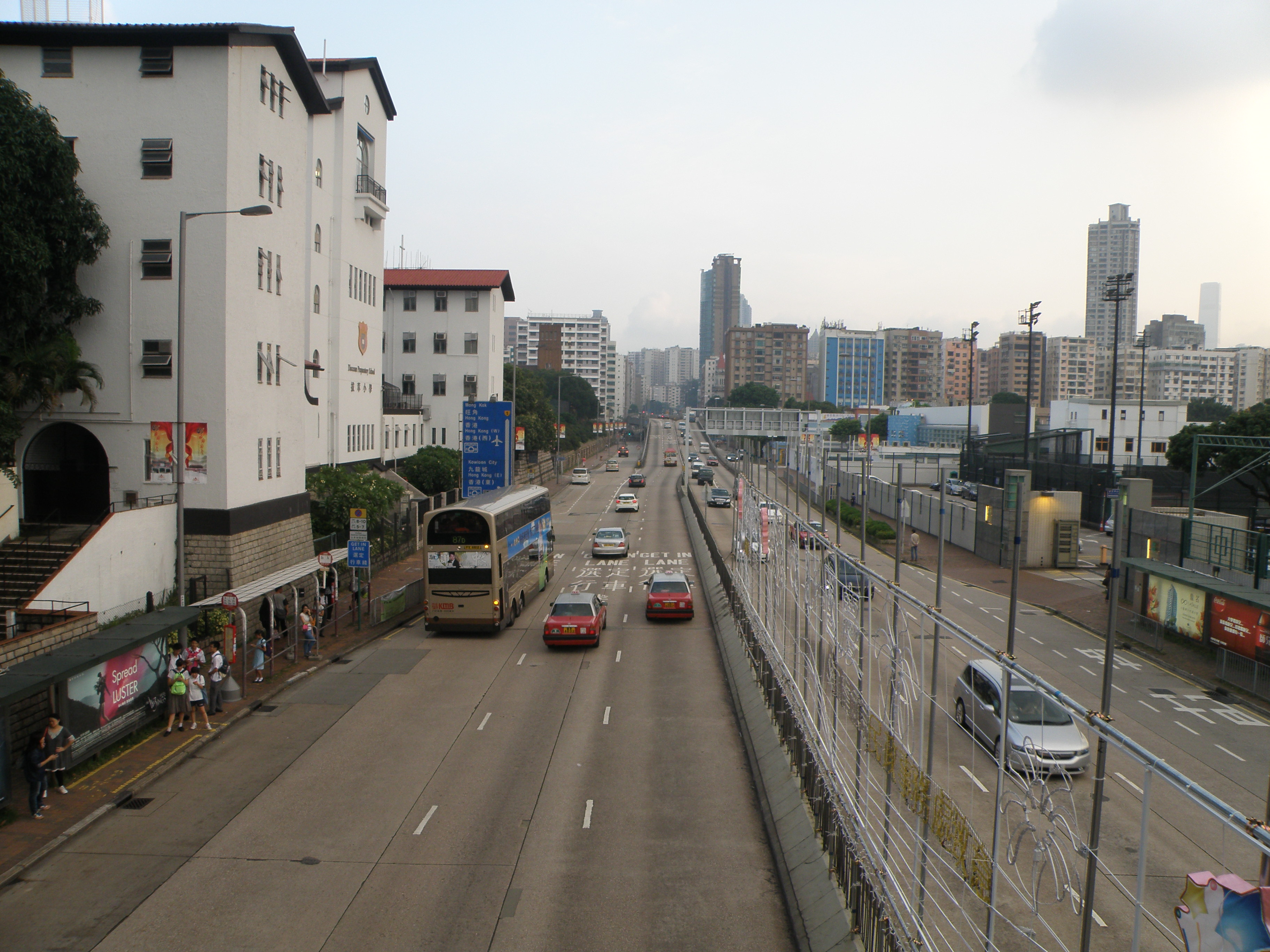
Waterloo Road near Kowloon Tong, facing Kowloon

Waterloo Road (Chinese: 窩打老道; Jyutping: wo1 daa2 lou5 dou6) is one of the principal north-south thoroughfares of Kowloon, Hong Kong. It stretches from Yau Ma Tei to Kowloon Tong.

== Location ==
The road starts in the west at the intersection with Lai Cheung Road and Ferry Street, and runs east past Nathan Road. It then runs on a northeast-southwest alignment through the Yau Ma Tei and Ho Man Tin until the intersection with Princess Margaret Road and Argyle Street. The road then takes another turn and runs north through Kowloon Tong, leading towards the Lion Rock Tunnel.

== History ==
Waterloo Road was named to commemorate the Battle of Waterloo. It was laid out in the early 20th century. The stretch of the road through Kowloon Tong was built in 1922 as part of the plans to develop the area. This portion of the road was designated as part of Hong Kong's Route 1 in 1974, and is the only part of Route 1 which features several intersections without grade separation.

== Features ==
Kwong Wah Hospital, Wah Yan College, Kowloon, Maryknoll Convent School and True Light Girls' College are located on Waterloo Road in Yau Ma Tei. The wholesale Fruit Market and the Yau Ma Tei Theatre are located at the road's junction with Reclamation Street in Yau Ma Tei. Universal Models Limited is also situated on the Yau Ma Tei section.

The road intersects Argyle Street, a major street in Kowloon. Danger Flag Hill is a landmark located near the road.

The Yau Ma Tei station of MTR was initially named Waterloo station as it is at the junction of Waterloo Road and Nathan Road.

== Literature ==
Waterloo Road features in the book Kowloon Tong: A Novel of Hong Kong by Paul Theroux.

== See also ==
- List of streets and roads in Hong Kong

Preceded by Princess Margaret Road	Hong Kong Route 1 Waterloo Road	Succeeded by Lion Rock Tunnel Road
