= Yau Ma Tei =

Area in Kowloon Peninsula, Hong Kong

Coordinates: 22.31301°N 114.17053°E

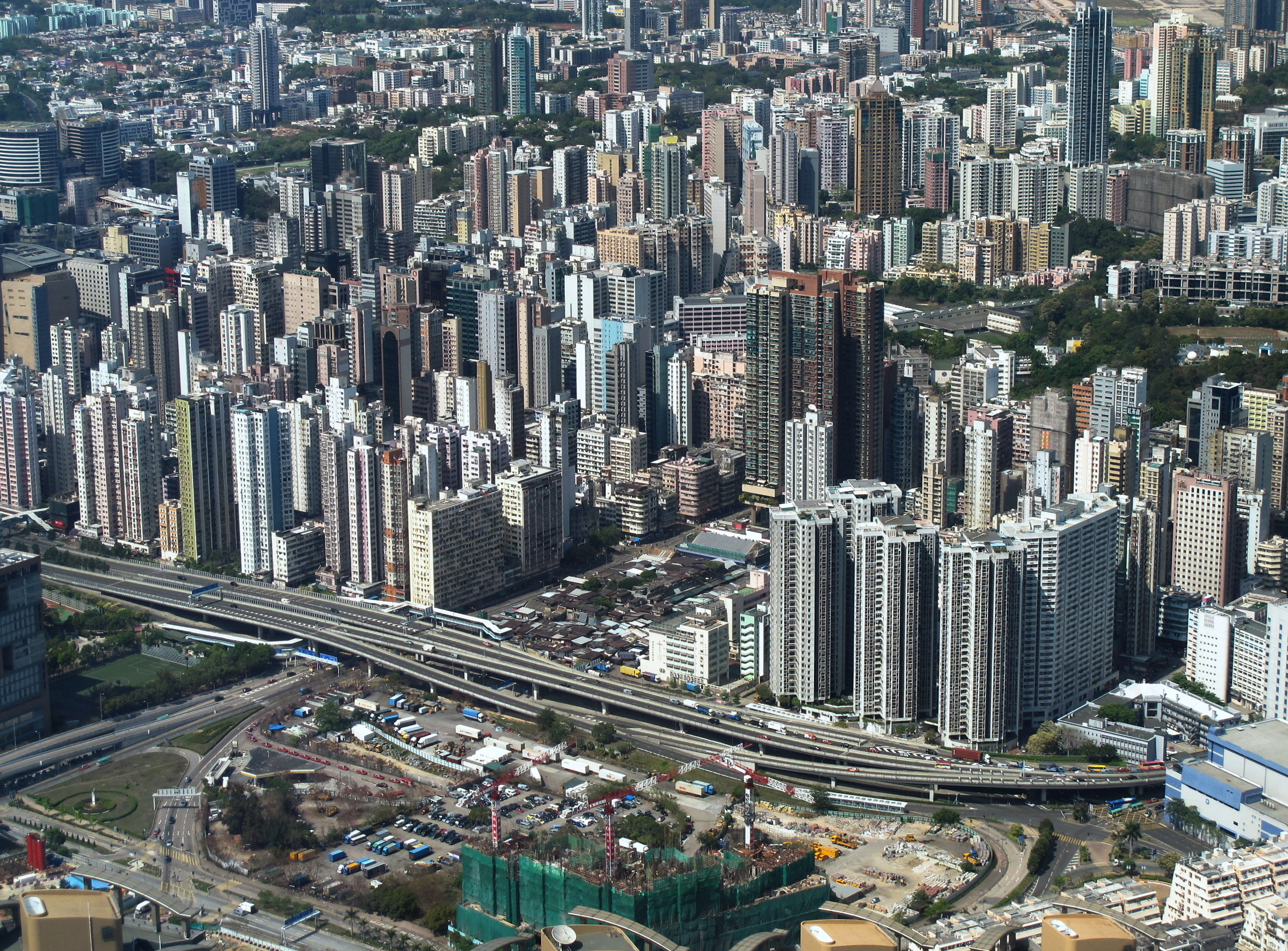
- Chinese: 油麻地
- Literal meaning: Oil-Jute Ground
Transcriptions
Standard Mandarin
- Hanyu Pinyin: Yóumádì
Hakka
- Romanization: yiu4 ma2 ti4
Yue: Cantonese
- Yale Romanization: Yàuh màh deih
- Jyutping: Jau4 maa4 dei2

Alternative Chinese name
- Chinese: 油蔴地
Transcriptions
Standard Mandarin
- Hanyu Pinyin: Yóumádì
Yue: Cantonese
- Yale Romanization: Yàuh màh deih
- Jyutping: Jau4 maa4 dei2

Yau Ma Tei is an area in the Yau Tsim Mong District in the south of the Kowloon Peninsula in Hong Kong.

== Name ==
Yau Ma Tei is a phonetic transliteration of the name 油麻地 (originally written as 油蔴地) in Cantonese. It can also be spelt as Yaumatei, Yau Ma Ti, Yaumati, Yaumáti or Yau-ma-Tee.

Yau (油) literally means "oil", Ma (麻 or 蔴) can either refer to "sesame" or "jute", and Tei (地) means "field" or "open ground". Hence, Yau Ma Tei can be interpreted to mean either "oil-sesame field" or "oil and jute ground". This dual-interpretation is perhaps the reason for there being two explanations for the origin of the place name.

== Geography ==
Dundas Street marks the north border of Yau Ma Tei with Mong Kok and Austin Road its south border with Jordan and Tsim Sha Tsui. To its west is Victoria Harbour and its east the hilly region of Ho Man Tin.

Southern Yau Ma Tei was traditionally known as Kwun Chung, but came to be called Jordan after the completion of Jordan MTR station at its heart.

== History ==
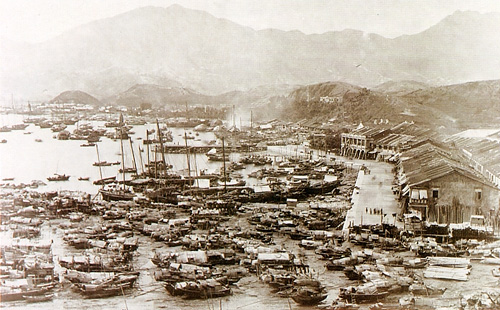
The shore of Yau Ma Tei in 1880

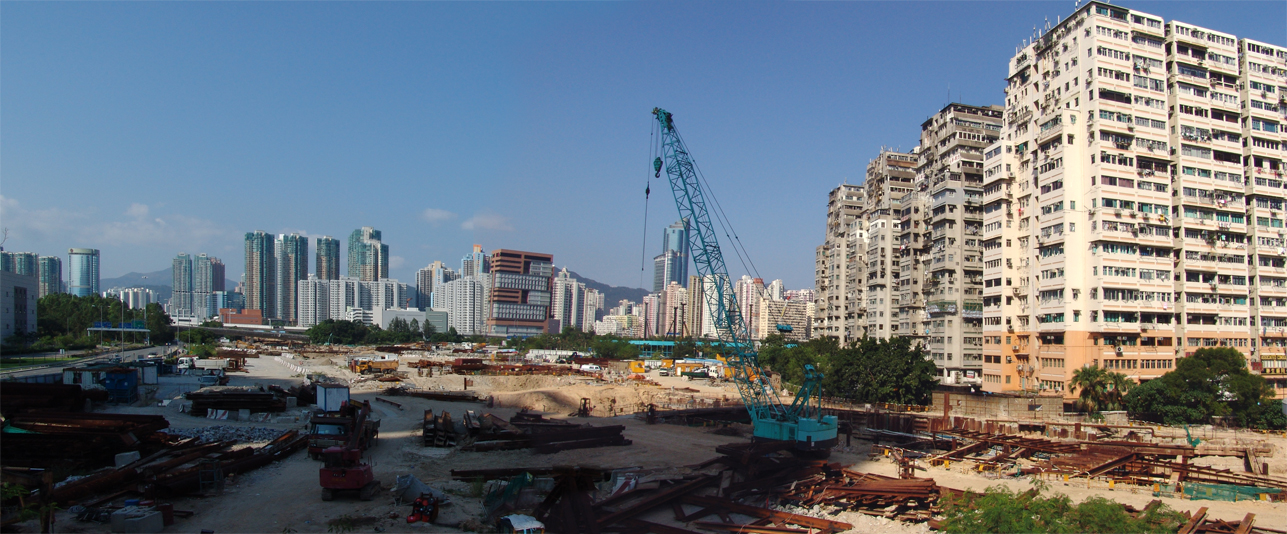
The old shore of Yau Ma Tei in 2008

Yau Ma Tei was a village in Kowloon. It was mentioned that a Chinese burial ground was assigned at a mile northeast of a village of Yau-ma-Tee at 2 December 1871. The name Yau Ma Tei is not thought to pre-date British rule. However, Kwun Chung is mentioned in many historic documents. Kwun Chung was a river valley with village and cultivation. To the south, a hill near the coast was used as a fortification by the military of the Qing dynasty during the 19th century. In 1839, Qing official Lin Zexu ordered the construction of a fortification in the area to defend against possible British attacks. When the First Opium War broke out, the fortification, along with another fort in Tsim Sha Tsui, saw action against British forces during the Battle of Kowloon.

Before the ceding of Kowloon to the British in 1860, Yau Ma Tei was a beach and a bay gathering many Tanka fishermen. Its water remains a harbour for fishermen after several times of reclamation by the Hong Kong Government. The Yau Ma Tei Typhoon Shelter became an exotic water area where restaurants on boats offered dishes of indigenous seafood. These 'typhoon shelter dishes' remain famous to this day and are even offered on land. The typhoon shelter not only hosted fishermen, but was also a port in Hong Kong. Numerous piers were built along its shore. Ferry Point in the southern part of Yau Ma Tei was a transportation hub where many commuters took ferries to and from Hong Kong Island. The service was offered by Hongkong and Yaumati Ferry.

Inland, the reclamation became the residential area for the ever-increasing Chinese population, with retail shops on the street level. Shanghai Street was the main street before being replaced by Nathan Road. Along Waterloo Road is the century-old Fruit Market; its adjacent Yaumati Theatre was once the largest in Kowloon. The Kwong Wah Hospital was the first hospital on the Kowloon peninsula, established in 1911. YMCA headquarters and its hostel in Hong Kong are located on the road. On 26 January 2021, 12 buildings in Yau Ma Tei were placed under lockdown due to COVID-19.

== Public health ==
Kwong Wah Hospital, run by charity Tung Wah Group of Hospitals, is the first major hospital in the area. Historically, there was a small pox hospital (油蔴地痘局) at the hill northeast of Kwong Wah Hospital. Founded by Hong Kong Government, Queen Elizabeth Hospital is another major hospital in the area.

Yaumatei Maternal & Child Health Centre (油麻地母嬰健康院) is under Family Health Service, Department of Health.

== Sightseeing ==
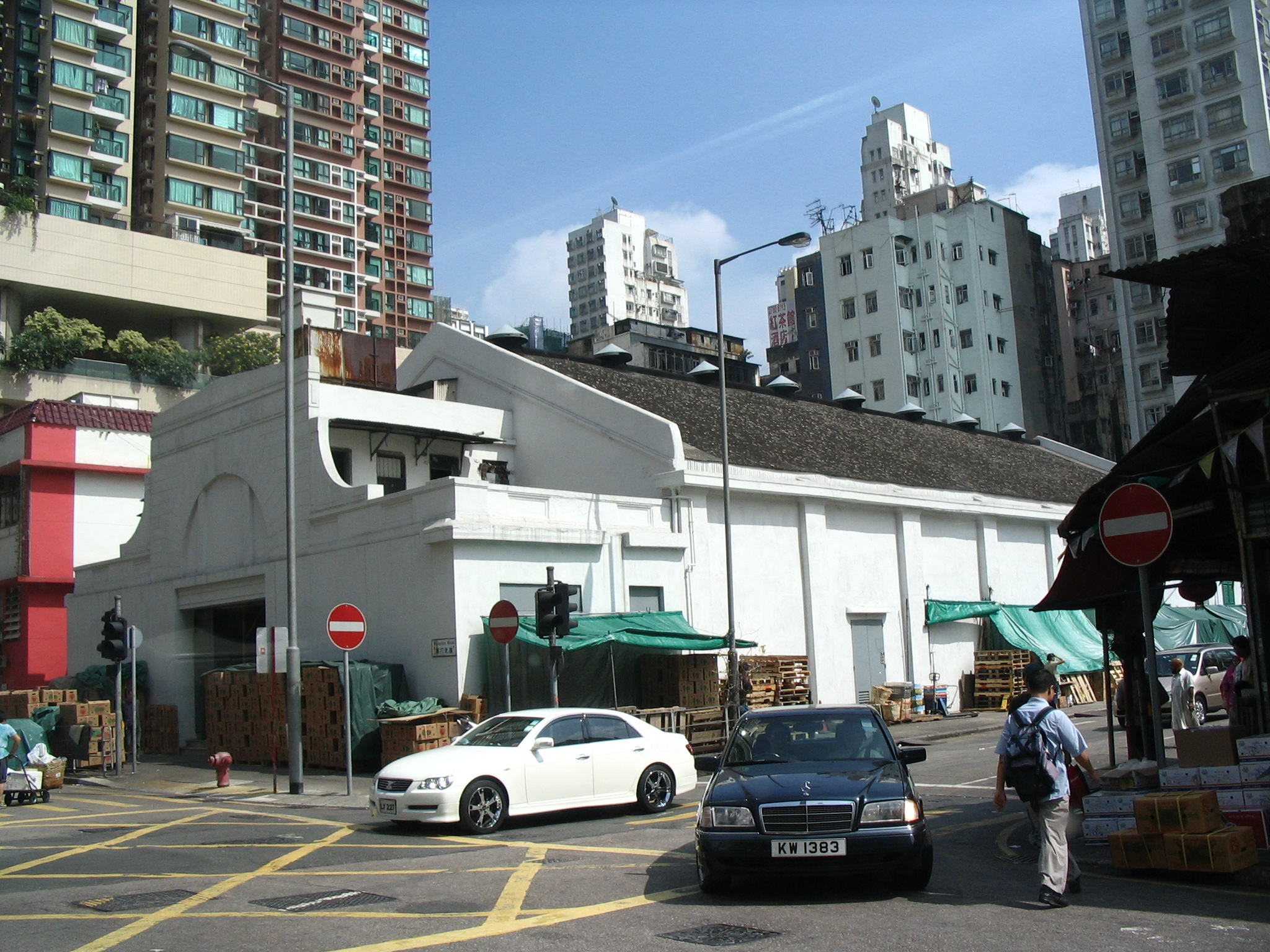
Yau Ma Tei Theatre in 2007. A small portion of the Yau Ma Tei Fruit Market can be seen on the right.

The district is mainly an area of mixed residential and retail. During day time, the Yau Ma Tei wet market and fruit market are the markets to visit, buying souvenirs like dried noodles and some fruits. Every night there is a market selling many different kinds of products including clothes, decorations, VCD and toys in Temple Street, a street in the area where the famous Tin Hau Temple was built in 1876. The Temple is at Public Square Street. The square, known as Yung Shue Tau, was a night market. Jade Market and Jade Street, China's most revered green stone is in abundance here, with around 400 registered stall owners ready to pitch jade amulets, ornaments, necklaces and trinkets.

=== Museums ===
The Hong Kong International Hobby and Toy Museum (香港國際玩具博物館), located at No. 330 Shanghai Street, showcases models, toys and pop culture memorabilia from around the world. Exhibits include toy vehicles, dolls, action figures, cartoon characters, science fiction collectibles, model rockets, Japanese anime, classic toys.

Tung Wah Group of Hospitals Museum in Kwong Wah Hospital details the history of Tung Wah Group of Hospitals and its relation with Hong Kong people, is also located in Yau Ma Tei.

=== Historic buildings ===
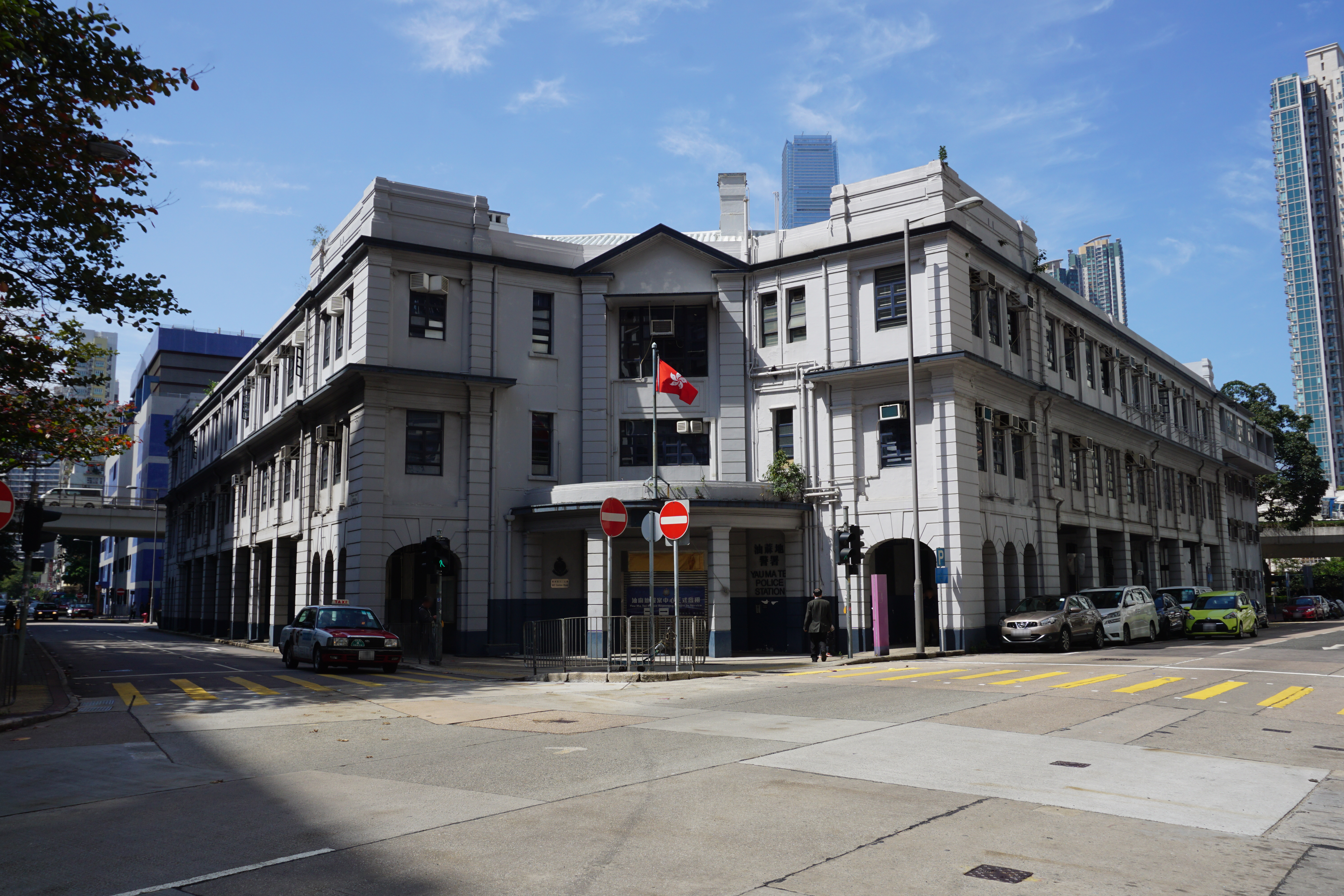
Old Yau Ma Tei Police Station

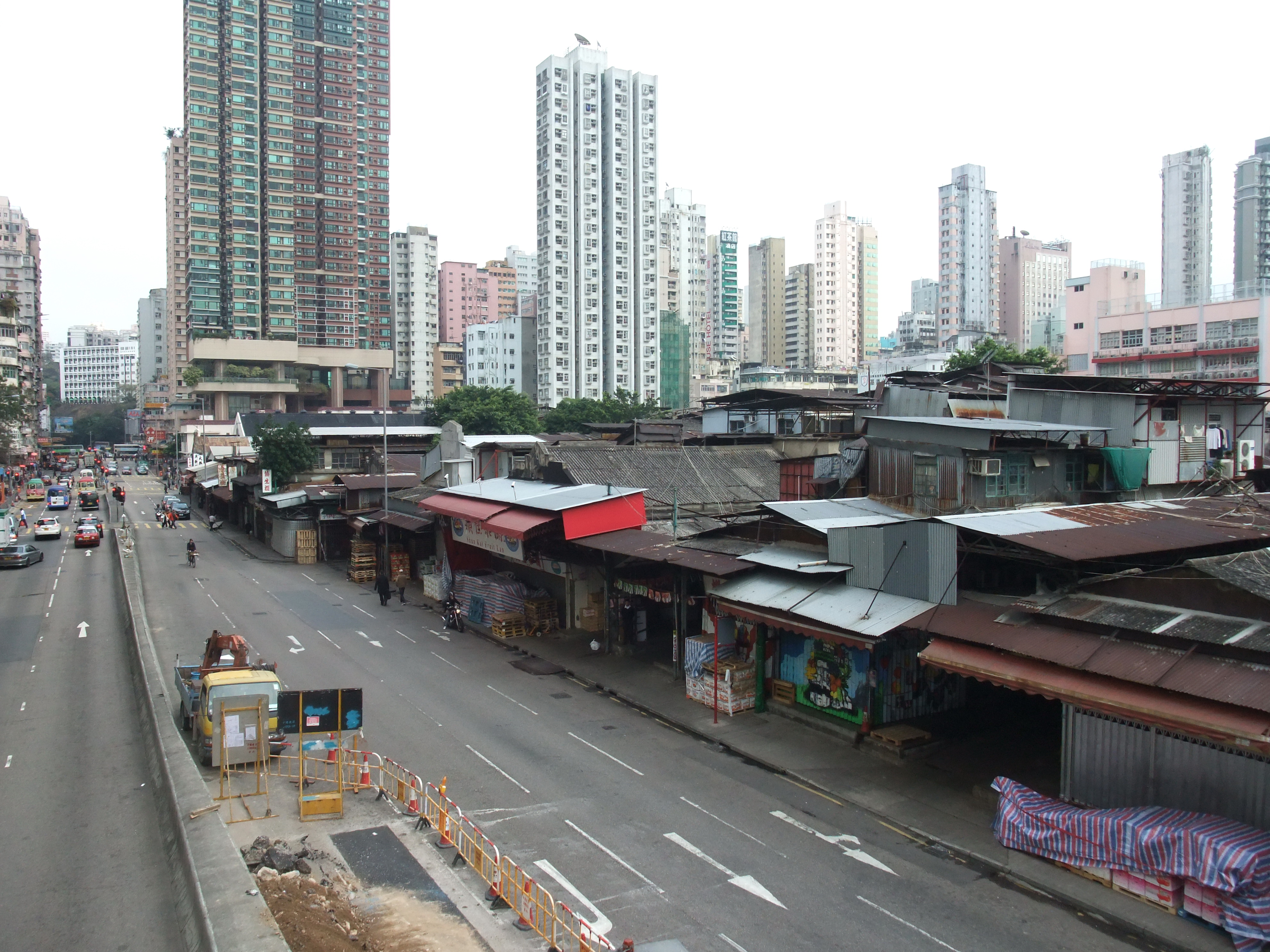
Yau Ma Tei Fruit Market

- Tin Hau Temple (油麻地天后廟)
- Old Yau Ma Tei Police Station
- Yau Ma Tei Fruit Market
- Yau Ma Tei Theatre
- Engineer's Office of the Former Pumping Station (Red Brick Building)
- Former Kowloon Magistracy
- Kowloon Union Church

== Public housing ==
=== Prosperous Garden ===
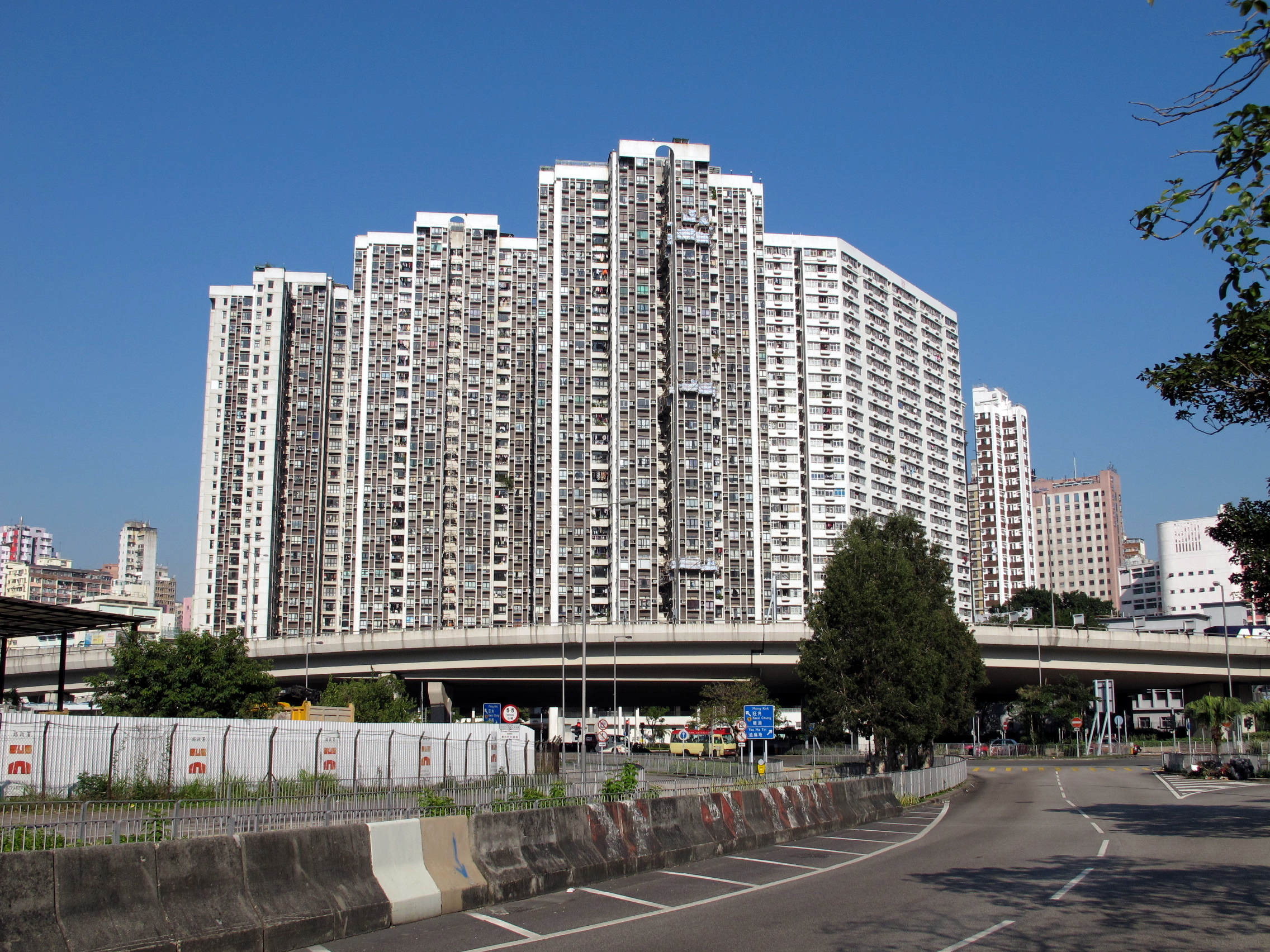
Prosperous Garden

In the 1980s, the Government handed over the redevelopment project of Lee Tat Street (利達街) and Cheung Shui Street (祥瑞街) in Yau Mei Tei (the two streets were later removed during redevelopment) to the Hong Kong Housing Society. This became Prosperous Garden (駿發花園), an "Urban Improvement Scheme" estate in Public Square Street Phase 1, including Block 1, 2 and 5, was completed in the site in 1991. Block 1 and 2 were for sale while Block 5 was for rental. Its Phase 2, including Block 3 and 4, was completed in 1995 and was for sale.

=== Hoi Fu Court ===
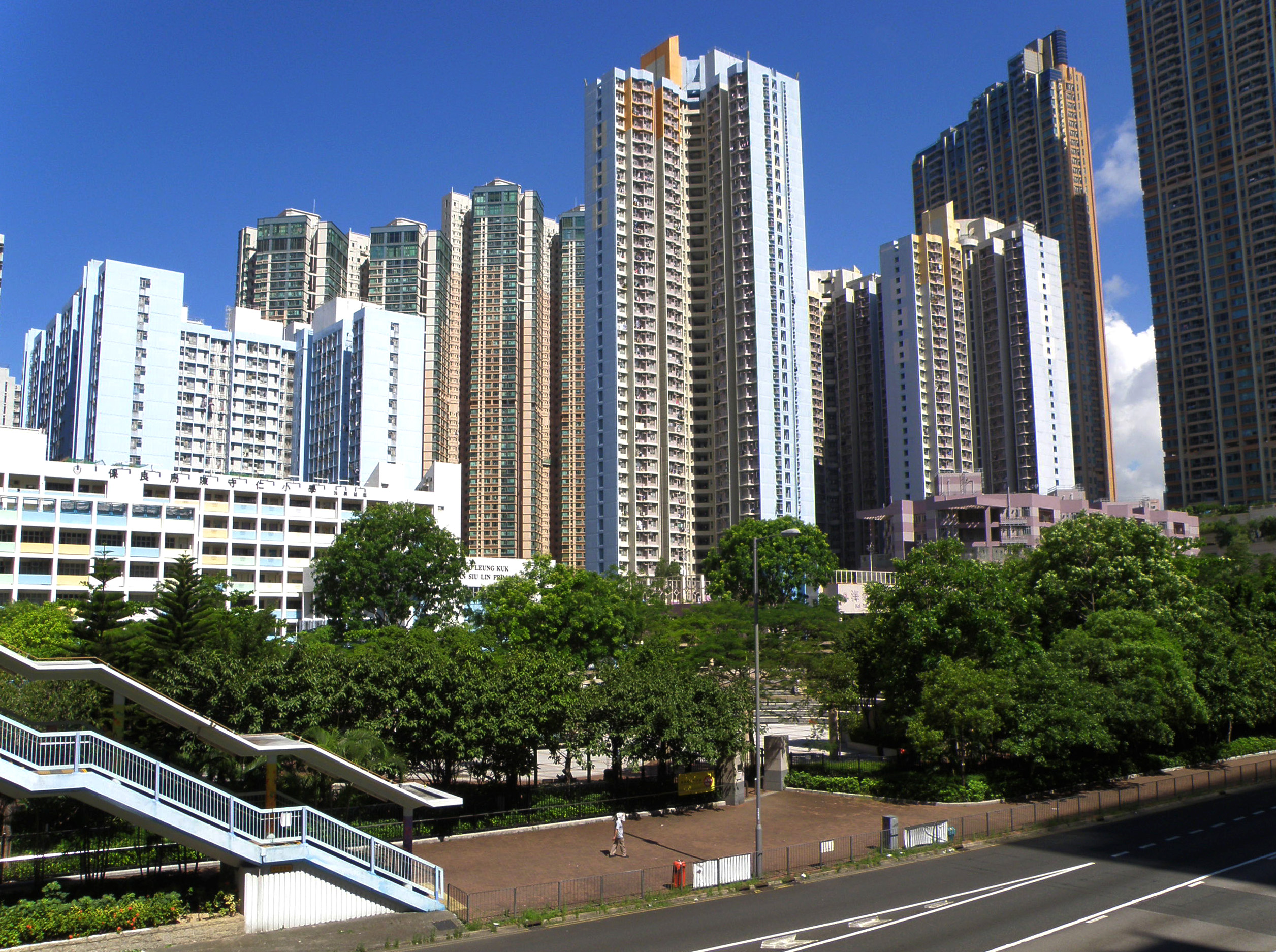
Hoi Fu Court

Hoi Fu Court (海富苑) is a mixed Home Ownership Scheme court and public estate built on reclaimed land of the old Yau Ma Tei Typhoon Shelter. It is the only public housing estate built by Hong Kong Housing Authority in the District. It comprises 6 blocks completed in 1999 and 2004.

Hoi Yu House of the estate was put under lockdown for mandatory COVID-19 testing on 7 February 2021.

Hoi Fu Court is in Primary One Admission (POA) School Net 31. Within the school net are multiple aided schools (operated independently but funded with government money) and Jordan Road Government Primary School.

=== Charming Garden ===
Charming Garden is an 18-block estate built under the Home Ownership Scheme and Private Sector Participation Scheme.

== Education ==
=== Primary and secondary schools ===
- Wah Yan College, Kowloon is a boys' school, located in 56 Waterloo Road in Yau Ma Tei.
- True Light Girls' College, a girls' EMI school, is adjacent to the above.
- The Methodist College is located in 50 Gascoigne Road in Yau Ma Tei. It is an EMI school for both boys and girls.
- Tung Koon Society Fong Shu Chuen School (東莞同鄉會方樹泉學校) is located near the Yau Ma Tei Fruit Market.

Yau Ma Tei is in Primary One Admission (POA) School Net 31. Within the school net are multiple aided schools (operated independently but funded with government money) and Jordan Road Government Primary School.

=== Public Library ===
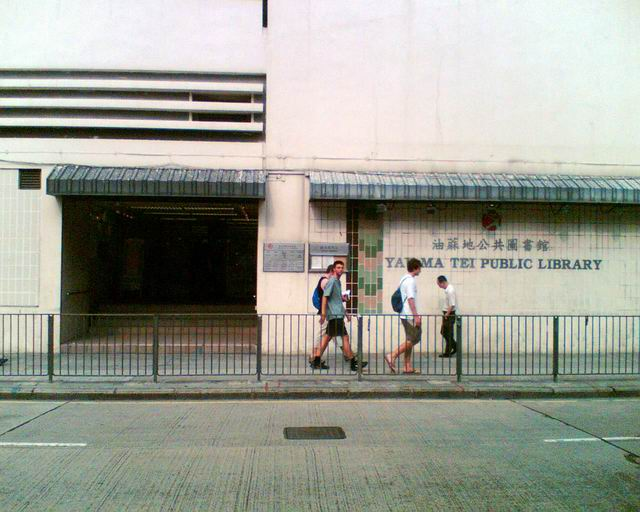
Yau Ma Tei Public Library

Hong Kong Public Libraries operates the Yau Ma Tei Public Library (油蔴地公共圖書館).

== Transport ==
Nathan Road goes north–south across the heart of Yau Ma Tei. Most of buses routes via Nathan Road to the destinations in North Kowloon and New Territories. Trains of MTR shuttle beneath the road. Yau Ma Tei is served by Tsuen Wan and Kwun Tong lines on the MTR metro system, at a single station with the same name, Yau Ma Tei MTR station. Other streets in the area or partly in the area include:

- Canton Road
- Dundas Street – shares its Chinese name (登打士街) with the Chinatown section of Dundas Street and in Toronto and are both named for Henry Dundas, 1st Viscount Melville
- Portland Street
- Public Square Street
- Reclamation Street
- Shanghai Street
- Temple Street

== See also ==
- List of places in Hong Kong
- Broadway Cinematheque
- Eaton Hotel Hong Kong
- Fo Pang
- King's Park, Hong Kong
- Kowloon Central Post Office
- Yau Ma Tei Car Park Building
- Yaumatei Ferry Pier
