= Yau Ma Tei Theatre =

Historic building in Kowloon, Hong Kong

Coordinates: 22.312436°N 114.169187°E

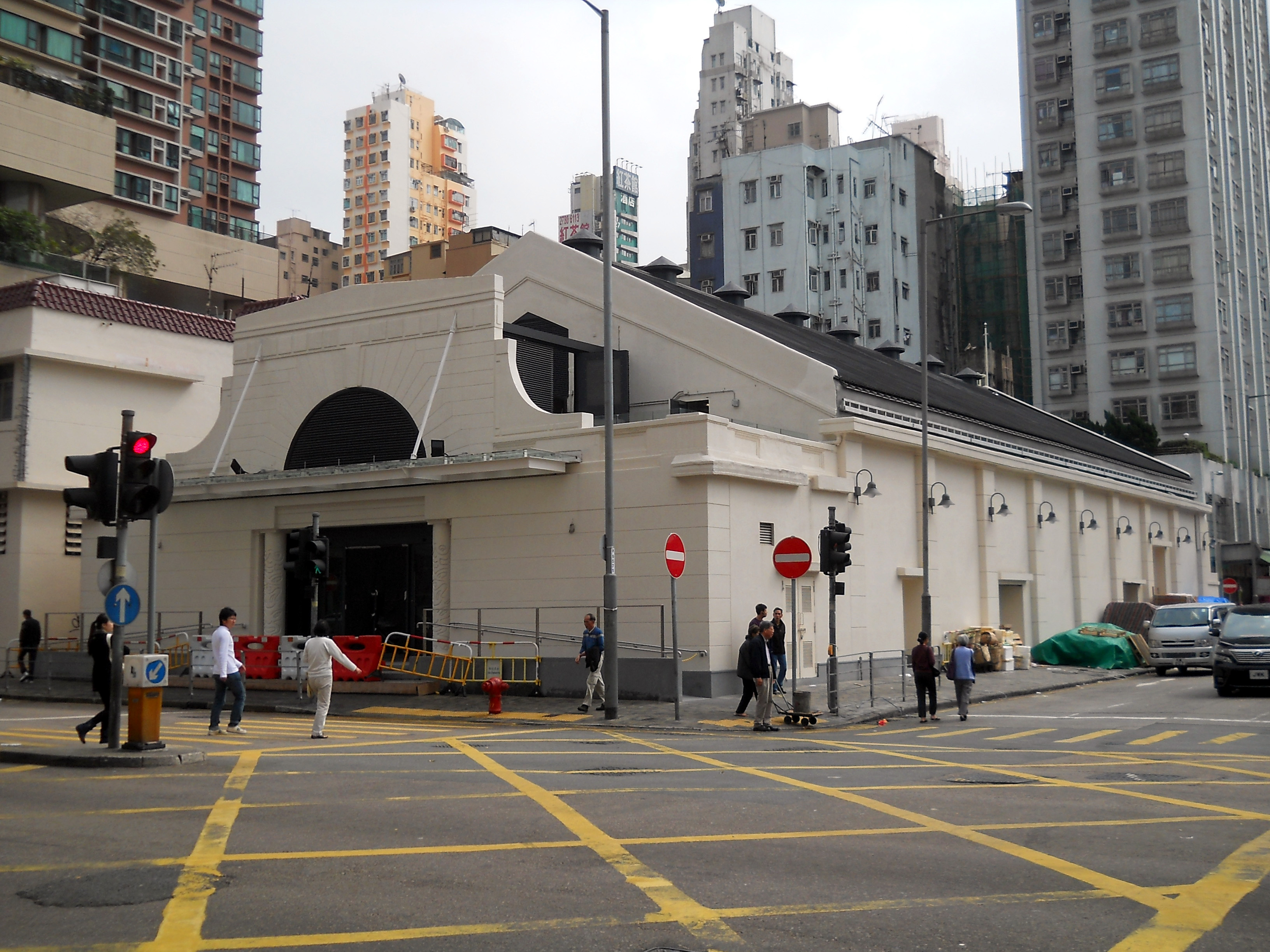
- Interactive map of Yau Ma Tei Theatre
- Address: 6 Waterloo Road; Yau Ma Tei
- Owner: Hong Kong Government
- Operator: Leisure and Cultural Services Department
- Capacity: 300
- Type: Chinese Opera
- Designation

Hong Kong Graded Building – Grade II
- Designated: 18 December 2009; 16 years ago
- Reference no.: 229

Construction
- Opened: 21 June 1930; 96 years ago
- Closed: 31 July 1998; 28 years ago
- Reopened: July 2012; 14 years ago
- Rebuilt: 2010-2012

Tenant
- Chinese Artists Association of Hong Kong

Website
- https://www.lcsd.gov.hk/en/ymtt/

Yau Ma Tei Theatre
- Traditional Chinese: 油麻地戲院
- Simplified Chinese: 油麻地戏院
Transcriptions
Standard Mandarin
- Hanyu Pinyin: Yóumádì Xìyuàn
Yue: Cantonese
- Yale Romanization: Yau maa deih hèih yún
- Jyutping: Jau3 maa3 dei6 hei4 jyun2

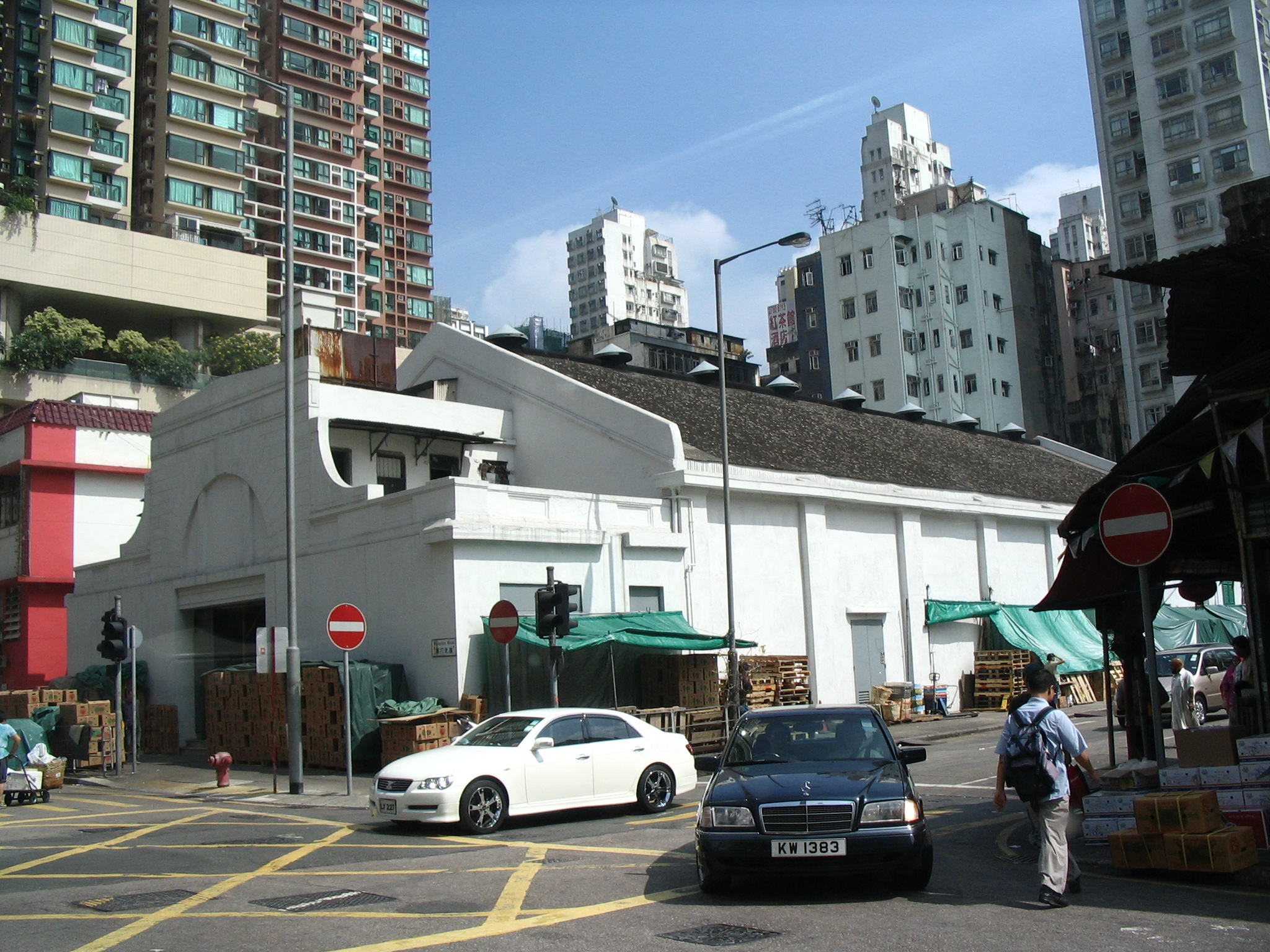
Yau Ma Tei Theatre in 2007. A small portion of the Yau Ma Tei Fruit Market can be seen on the right.

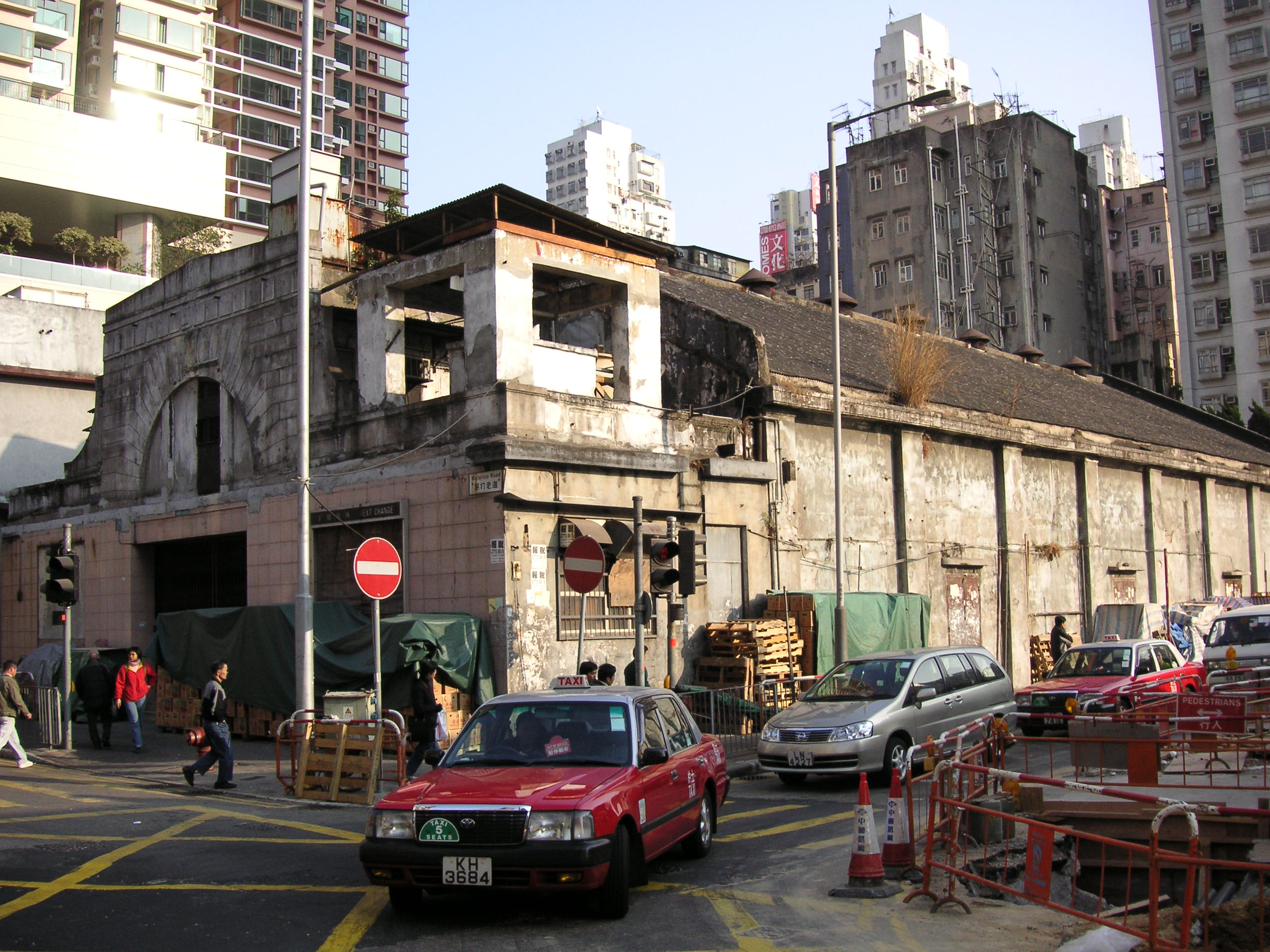
Yau Ma Tei Theatre in 2006.

Yau Ma Tei Theatre (sometimes transliterated as "Yaumati Theatre"), once the largest theatre in Kowloon, is located at the junction of Waterloo Road and Reclamation Street, in Yau Ma Tei, Hong Kong. It is classified as "Grade II Historic Building" It is the only remaining pre-World War II theatre in Kowloon. It was recently converted into a venue for Cantonese opera. Another historical structure, Yau Ma Tei Fruit Market is adjacent to the theatre, across Reclamation Street.

== Yau Ma Tei area ==
Situated in the south of Kowloon, Yau Ma Tei (油麻地 or 油蔴地) was once a village and is now one of the most historic areas in Hong Kong. Before British rule of Kowloon in 1860, Yau Ma Tei was known in historical documents by the name of Kwun Chung with Tanka fisherman clustering around its beach and bay. Today, after many reclamation attempts by the Hong Kong Government, a harbour still stands which is used for the fishing industry. Yau Ma Tei is also famous for its Typhoon Shelter and seafood dishes which are offered both on and off-shore.

Yau Ma Tei is now known as the part of Hong Kong "where the city never sleeps". The English spelling of Yau Ma Tei has variations such as Yau Ma Ti, Yaumatei, Yaumati or Yau-ma-tee. Part of the Yau Tsim Mong District, the Yau Ma Tei area has its north border at Dundas Street and Mong Kok while Tsim Sha Tsui and Austin share the south border. Victoria Harbour lies at its west, and the hills of Ho Man Tin at its east. Tourists and locals alike come to Yau Ma Tei for bargains at Temple Street night market, Chinese opera singing, and just to have a taste of the abundant cultural atmosphere. Other stalls located on the same street house fortune tellers and palm readers, goldsmiths, and wedding costumes. Aside from the traditional culture, modern structures such as the Broadway Cinematheque at Public Square Street presents Yau Ma Tei's modern culture.

=== Other historical structures ===
Yau Ma Tei is home to many historical buildings. On a southern coastal hill sits the Kwun Chung Fort constructed by Lin Tse-hsu, the Wing official of the cultivated village in a river valley at that time, to protect the village from the affronts of the British. Holding the British from Kowloon throughout the Battle of Kwun Chung in 1839, the fort was later taken down for development after the British took over Kowloon.

Other heritage sites include the Yau Ma Tei Fruit Market, located on Waterloo Road has been standing for a century. Adjacent to it is the Yaumati Theatre, previously the largest of its kind in the Kowloon area. Also down the road are the Kwong Wah Hospital, the first hospital established in Kowloon in 1911, and the YMCA headquarters and hostel. The Yau Ma Tei Police Station in the district holds great historical value.

Near the Yau Ma Tei Theater lies the Red Brick Building (known as The Engineer's Office of the Former Pumping Station) which is also being converted into a Xiqu Activity Centre for the performance and training of Cantonese opera.

== History of the theatre ==
Sources conflict over the exact year the Yaumati Theatre was completed and open to public, which fall between 1925 and 1931. The décor of the theatre has shown some hints for the opening time of it. In the late 1920s, the dominant architectural style was the Neo-classicism while the Art Deco was an emerging trend of the next decade. While the front and the proscenium arch were designed as Neo-classical style with Art Deco influence, the interior décor of the theatre is Art Deco. This provides a crucial clue that the theatre was built in the late 1920s but not the mid-1920s. Another important clue is the manufacturers’ label found on the vintage film projectors kept in the projection room. Both of them were manufactured by Strong Electric Corp. of Toledo, Ohio, USA, and one of them has a patent registration year of 1927 and 1928. From this it can be proves that the cinema was opened no earlier than 1928.

The Theatre used to be the venue of entertainment for working class citizens and was patronized by rickshaw riders, coolies and low-income families. It gradually lost customers to newer theatres in later time, particularly in the 1980s when the popularity of home video entertainment increased. Toward the end of its life, it screened erotic films to maintain its business. Some traditional cinemas in Hong Kong were demolished and re-developed into shopping malls and ‘mini-cinema complexes’ (a complex of small cinemas with 200 or less than 200 seats). Yaumati Theatre was not converted to either of because of its inherent spatial and technical problems of its pre-war design. In order to survive through the vigorous competition with other cinemas, Yaumati Theatre started to screen erotic films and even sold pornographic tapes in the concourse in order to increase the profit.

The theatre finally closed on 31 July 1998. In the same year, it became a Grade II historical monument and the only pre-WWII monument that survived in the Kowloon area.

=== Movies shown throughout the years ===
- Pre-World War II period: Silent movies
- From 1930s to the eve of Pacific War: English-language movies (mainly Hollywood productions) and Chinese-language movies (mainly Shanghai productions)
- During the Japanese occupation of Hong Kong (1941-1945): Japanese movies and propaganda films
- Post-war years to 1960s: Mainstream Hong Kong-Cantonese movies produced by local production companies (mainly Lan Kwong Film Company (嶺光影業公司) and Kong Ngee Company (光藝製片公司)).
- 1970s: Mandarin-language movies (primarily from Shaw Brothers Studio and Golden Harvest)
- 1980s: Cantonese-language movies from Golden Princess Amusement Co., Ltd.
- After the late-1980s: 'Chain Showing' (連環場) of pornographic films, i.e., one ticket for several adult movies shown in one day
- 31 July 1998: Closure of Yaumati Theatre

== Cantonese opera venue ==
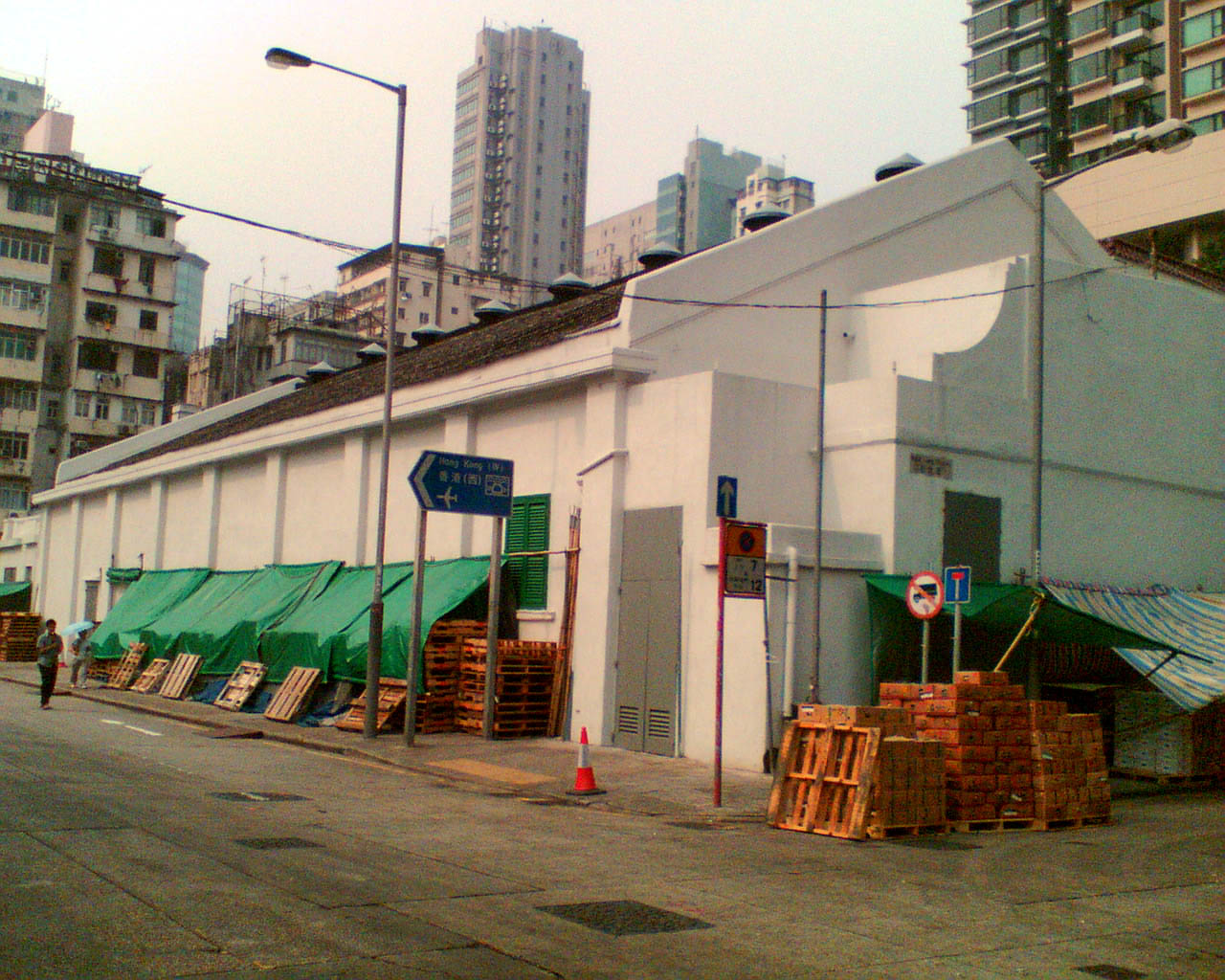
The back of the building.

Yaumati Theatre is the only pre-war theatre building in Hong Kong still in existence. It is now being renovated to become a permanent venue for Cantonese opera.

This conversion of Yaumati Theatre it into a Xiqu Activity Centre was proposed by the Hong Kong government in 2007 for the purpose of preserving and promoting Cantonese opera in Hong Kong, as well as facilitate the sustainable development of Cantonese opera by providing performing and practising venue for Cantonese opera troupes. According to the 2007 Policy Address, this centre will include a 300-seat auditorium, stage and multi-function rooms, with the Red Brick Building acting as a supporting facility.

Conversion works are planned to commence in the second half of 2009 and were scheduled to be completed in 2011. The venue reopened in 2012.

=== Heritage impact assessment ===
Yaumati Theatre has been a Grade II historic building since December 1998. The implications of this is that all alterations on the building have to comply with a set of heritage conservation requirements in order to guide its future use and protect its cultural significance, including long-term development, conversation and maintenance plans for the building. The Heritage Impact Assessment (HIA) for Yaumati Theatre was carried out by Architectural Conservation Office on behalf of the Architectural Services Department in October 2008, with the agreement of both Cantonese Opera Advisory Committee and the Antiquities and Monuments Office of HKSAR Government.

== See also ==
- List of cinemas in Hong Kong
- Ko Shing Theatre
- Lee Theatre
