= Reclamation Street =

Street in Kowloon, Hong Kong

Coordinates: 22.31105°N 114.16930°E

- Chinese: 新填地街
Transcriptions
Standard Mandarin
- Hanyu Pinyin: Xīntiándì Jiē
Yue: Cantonese
- Jyutping: San1 tin4 dei6 gaai1

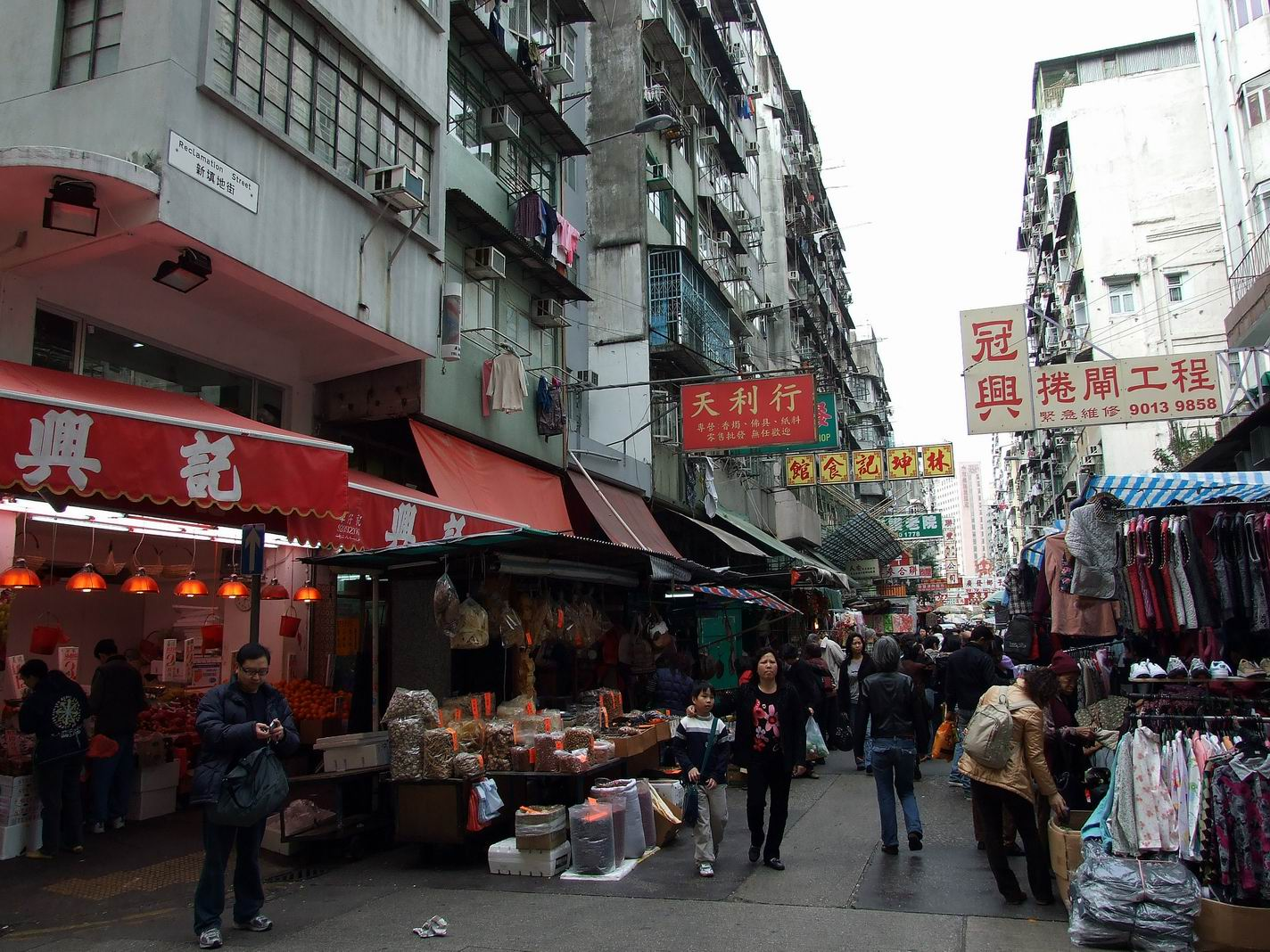
Street market in the Jordan section of Reclamation Street.

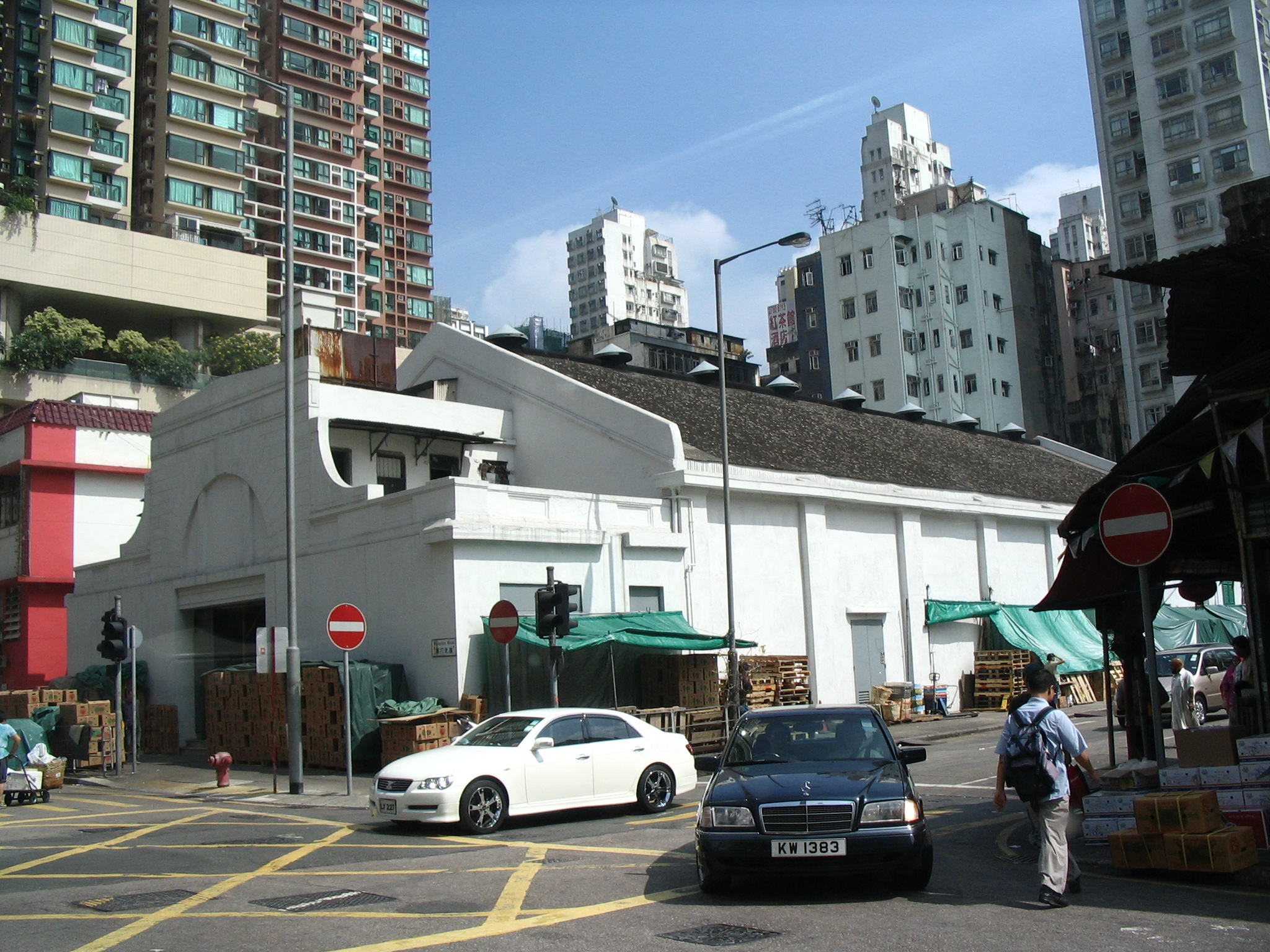
Yaumati Theatre at the corner of Waterloo Road and Reclamation Street, in Yau Ma Tei.

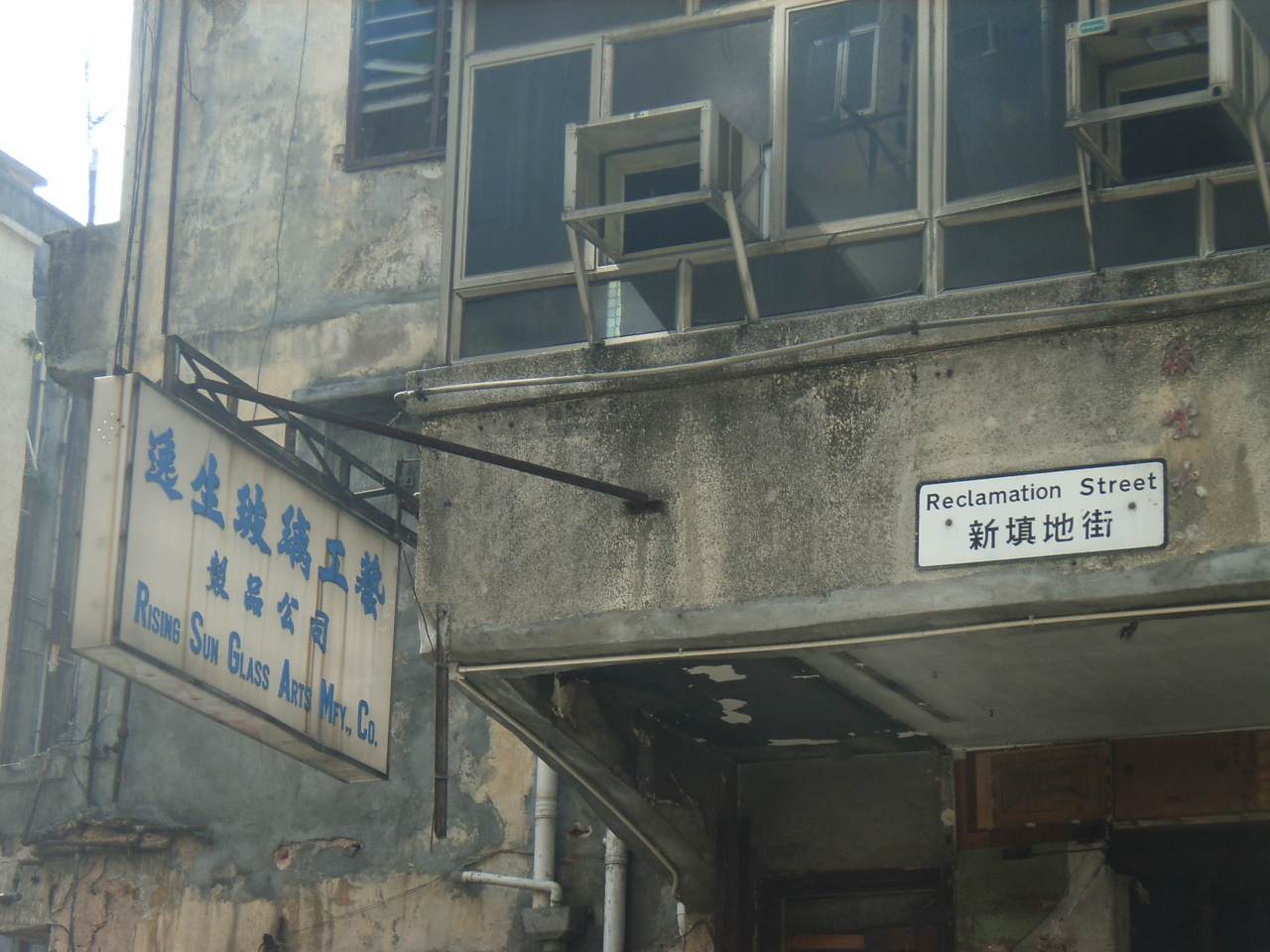
Reclamation Street in Mong Kok.

Reclamation Street (Chinese: 新填地街; Jyutping: san1 tin4 dei6 gaai1) is a street stretching from Jordan to Mong Kok, Kowloon, Hong Kong. As its name suggests, it was built on the reclaimed western shore of the Kowloon Peninsula.

== Location ==
Reclamation Street is on a north–south axis and runs mostly parallel to and west of Nathan Road. It starts at the junction with Nanking Street in the south and ends in the north at the junctions of Lai Chi Kok Road and Prince Edward Road West in the Prince Edward area. The street is mostly located between Canton Road on the west and Shanghai Street on the east. It is interrupted in two locations, and is thus made up of three sections – The Jordon section in the south, the middle section in Yau Ma Tei and the Mong Kok section in the north.

== Features ==
For the most part, Reclamation Street is closed to public traffic. The street features one of the largest, if not longest fresh produce markets in Hong Kong.

Being an old services district, the street is typically lined with old residential buildings usually no more than 5 storeys high. Most of these buildings are walk-ups, meaning, they have no elevators. At the street level, there is a wide range of wholesale and service type businesses – typically workshops of one sort or other, ship chandlers, catering and other similarly related small businesses. The wholesale Yau Ma Tei Fruit Market and the former Yaumati Theatre are located at the street's junction with Waterloo Road.

== Trivia ==
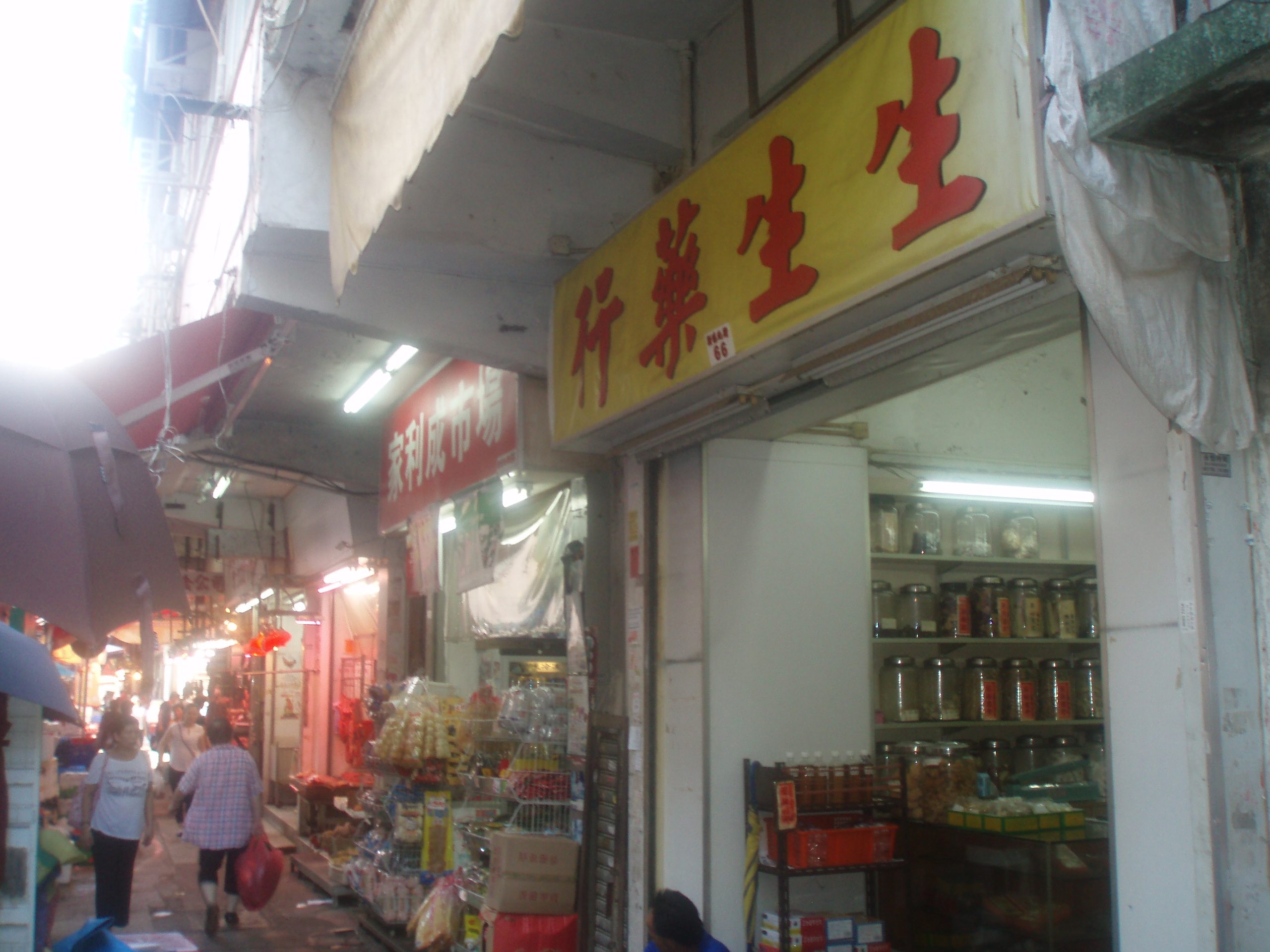
The herbalist store Sang Sang (66 Reclamation Street) was visited by the American TV show The Amazing Race 2.

The herbalist store Sang Sang (生生藥行), which is located at house number 66 on this street, was a site of the Detour in the seventh leg of the reality TV show The Amazing Race 2.

== See also ==
- List of streets and roads in Hong Kong
