= Charming Garden =

Housing estate in Hong Kong

Coordinates: 22.31387°N 114.16550°E

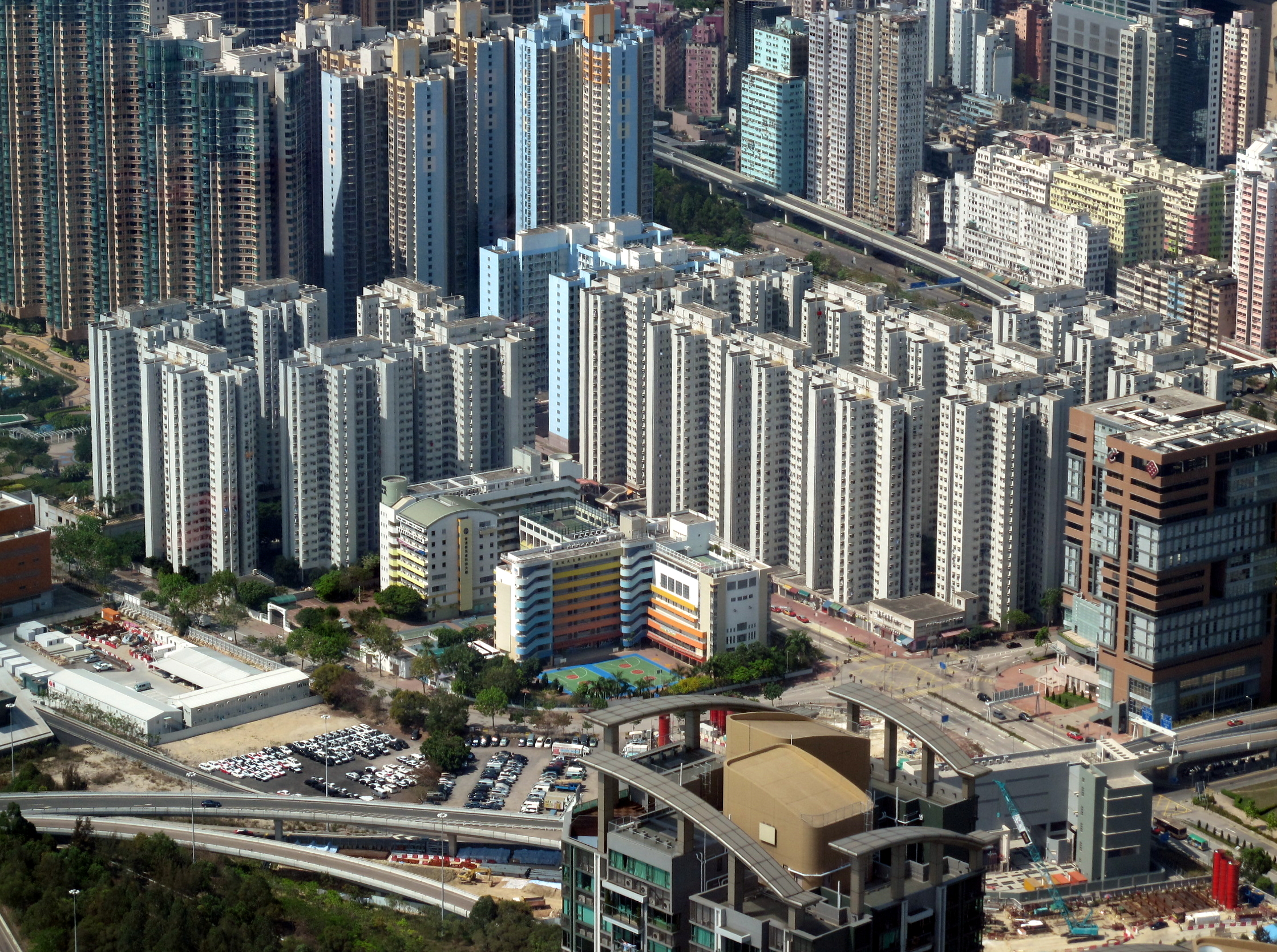
- Traditional Chinese: 富榮花園
- Simplified Chinese: 富荣花园
Transcriptions
Standard Mandarin
- Hanyu Pinyin: Fùróng Huāyuán
Yue: Cantonese
- Jyutping: fu3 wing4 faa1 jyun4

Charming Garden (Chinese: 富榮花園) is a Home Ownership Scheme and Private Sector Participation Scheme court in Mong Kok, Kowloon, Hong Kong, built on reclaimed land of the old Yau Ma Tei Typhoon Shelter. It was jointly developed by Hong Kong Housing Authority and Chevalier Group. It comprises 18 blocks completed in 1998.

Charming Garden is in Primary One Admission (POA) School Net 31. Within the school net are multiple aided schools (operated independently but funded with government money) and Jordan Road Government Primary School.
