= List of Hong Kong post offices =

The postal system in Hong Kong was established in 1841 and came under the control of the British Empire's Royal Mail in 1843. Authority over Hong Kong's post offices changed to Hongkong Post during the handover of Hong Kong to China on July 1, 1997. In April 2020, Hongkong Post had 120 post offices—30 on Hong Kong Island, 35 in Kowloon, and 56 in the New Territories and Outlying Islands. In addition, its three mobile post offices provide postal services in remote areas in the New Territories. Following is a list of current and former post offices in Hong Kong.

== Overview ==
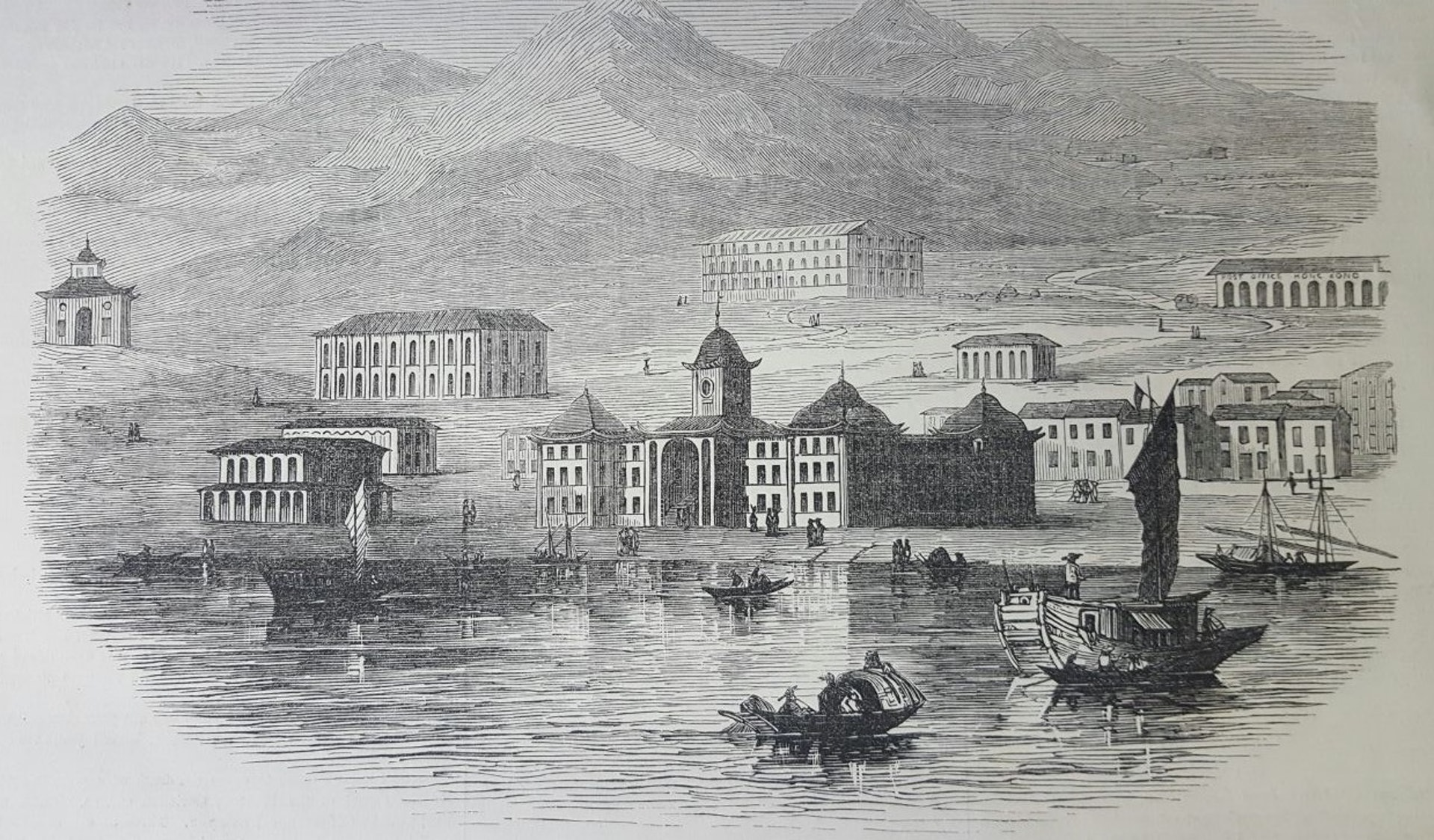
First Hong Kong General Post Office in Coastal Central 中環海徬香港第一代郵政總局, 1841-1846

The postal system in Hong Kong was established in August 1841, with the first post office opening i on April 15, 1842. When Hong Kong became a British Crown Colony in 1843, its post offices were placed under control the Postmaster General of the United Kingdom in London, England. The various iterations of the General Post Offices became landmarks in Hong Kong.

Many post offices were closed during the Japanese occupation of Hong Kong during World War II, with most locations reopening between 1942 and 1945, when the United Kingdom regained control. The British also used the post office locations for political gain, such as distributing political booklets at post office locations.

In 1960, mobile post offices were introduced to serve remote locations and villages. During the 1970s, Hong Kong's postage stamp designs led to it becoming an international philatelic centre, leading to the designation of several post offices as philately sales centers in 1975. Thousands of people line up outside these post offices at midnight the day before new stamp releases. For a May 1997 stamp release, 23 of Hong Kong's post offices opened early to accommodate lines that were 11.5 kilometres (7.1 mi) long.

Authority over the post offices changed to Hongkong Postal during the handover of Hong Kong to China on July 1, 1997. In April 2020, Hongkong Postal had 124 post offices—30 on Hong Kong Island, 35 in Kowloon, and 56 in the New Territories and Outlying Islands and 3 mobile offices.

== Postal network ==
The Postmaster General is responsible for the establishment of post offices in Hong Kong. Under the Hong Kong Planning Standards and Guidelines, residents of urban areas should have access to a post office within 1.2 kilometres (0.75 mi) from where they live or work. For rural areas, a distance of 3.2 kilometres (2.0 mi) was established. Hongkong Post supplements its remote post office locations with mobile post offices.

Evolution of the number of post offices
Date	Total	Hong Kong Island	Kowloon	New Territories and Outlying Islands	Mobile post offices	Ref.
April 1842	1	1				
1954	8					
1964	30					
November 1982	89				3	
September 1993	125					
March 2002	131				3	
March 2010	127	31	37	57 (49 + 8)	2	
March 2015	127				2	
September 2015	127	32	35	57 (49 + 8)	3	
April 2020	124	30	35	56	3	

== Active post offices ==
=== Post offices on Hong Kong Island ===
Following are the active post offices for Hong Kong Island.

Name	Established	Image	Location	Notes	Ref.
Aberdeen (香港仔郵政局)	1986		Aberdeen Main Road, Aberdeen	Philately center.	
Ap Lei Chau (鴨脷洲郵政局)	1980		Ap Lei Chau Estate, Ap Lei Chau		
Causeway Bay (銅鑼灣郵政局)	2011		Shops 1015–1018, 10th Floor, Windsor House, Causeway Bay		
Chai Wan (柴灣郵政局)	1978		Yue Wan Estate, Chai Wan Road, Chai Wan		
General Post Office (郵政總局)	11 August 1976		2 Connaught Place, Central	This five-story building was designed by K. M. Tseng, an architect with Hong Kong's Architectural Services Department and includes counter service, a delivery office, and a sorting office. It is the 4th location of the General Post Office. Philately center.	
Gloucester Road (告士打道郵政局)	1992		Gloucester Road, Wan Chai		
Happy Valley (跑馬地郵政局)	1990		Sing Woo Road, Happy Valley		
Heng Fa Chuen (杏花邨郵政局)	1989		Heng Fa Chuen		
Hing Fat Street (興發街郵政局)	1983		Causeway Bay Kaifong Welfare Advancement Association Bradbury Building, Hing Fat Street, Tin Hau		
Hing Man Street (興民街郵政局)	1995		Wing Hing Court, Hing Man Street, Sai Wan Ho		
Johnston Road (莊士敦道郵政局)	2012		G/F, Shop 2, 22 Johnston Road, Wan Chai		
Kennedy Town (堅尼地城郵政局)	2006		Kennedy Town Community Complex, Rock Hill Street, Kennedy Town		
King's Road (英皇道郵政局)	2005		Olympia Plaza, King's Road, North Point	Philately center.	
Lei Tung (利東郵政局)	1990		Lei Tung Estate, Ap Lei Chau	This post office moved to its current location in 2011	
Morrison Hill (摩理臣山郵政局)	1980		Oi Kwan Road, Wan Chai		
Peak (山頂郵政局)	1995		Peak Tower, Peak Road	Philately center.	
Perkins Road (白建時道郵政局)	1975		Perkins Road, Jardine's Lookout		
Pok Fu Lam (薄扶林郵政局)	1993		Fu Wing Yuen, Chi Fu Fa Yuen, Pok Fu Lam		
Repulse Bay (淺水灣郵政局)			Unit C, G/F, 2H South Bay Road		
Sai Ying Pun (西營盤郵政局)	Before 1924		27 Pok Fu Lam Road	This post office was opened before 1924. It closed during World War II when Hong Kong was under Japanese occupation, and reopened on 26 March 1942. It moved to its current location in 1967	
Shau Kei Wan (筲箕灣郵政局)	1988		Perfect Mount Gardens, Po Man Street, Shau Kei Wan	Philately center.	
Sheung Wan (上環郵政局)	1914		West Exchange Tower, Morrison Street, Sheung Wan	This post office closed during World War II when Hong Kong was under Japanese occupation, reopening on 14 February 1942. In 1988, its name was changed to the Western Branch Post Office. Its name was changed back to Sheung Wan Post Office in 1991. Philately center.	
Siu Sai Wan (小西灣郵政局)	1995		Siu Sai Wan Estate, Chai Wan		
Stanley (赤柱郵政局)	1937		2 Wong Ma Kok Road, Stanley	It is the oldest post office building still in service in Hong Kong and was renovated in 2007. This post office closed during World War II when Hong Kong was under Japanese occupation, reopening on 11 May 1942. It closed briefly in 2021 after a bus crashed into the building.	
Tai Koo Shing (太古城郵政局)	1994		Kam Sing Mansion, Tai Fung Avenue, Taikoo Shing	Philately center.	
Tsat Tsz Mui (七姊妹郵政局)	1989		Model Housing Estate, King's Road, North Point		
Wah Fu (華富郵政局)	1968		Wah Chun House, Wah Fu Estate		
Wan Chai (灣仔郵政局)	1915		Wu Chung House, Queen's Road East	Built in 1912 and first used as a post office in 1915, this was the oldest post office in Hong Kong until it moved to its current building in 1992. It closed during World War II when Hong Kong was under Japanese occupation, reopening on 14 February 1942. Philately center.	
Wyndham Street (雲咸街郵政局)	1984		Hoseinee House, Wyndham Street		

=== Post offices at Kowloon ===
Following is a list of active post offices for Kowloon.

Name	Established	Image	Location	Notes	Ref.
Cheung Sha Wan (長沙灣郵政局)	1966		576–586 Castle Peak Road, Cheung Sha Wan	This post office moved to its current location in the spring of 2013. Philately center.	
Choi Hung Chuen (彩虹邨郵政局)	1963		Choi Hung Estate, Kowloon		
Chuk Yuen (竹園郵政局)	1988		Chuk Yuen (South) Estate, Kowloon		
Concorde Road Post Office (協調道竹園郵政局)	2015		G/F, Trade and Industry Tower, 3 Concorde Road, Kai Tak		
Fu Shan (富山郵政局)	1979		Fu Shan Estate, Ngau Chi Wan		
Gillies Avenue (機利士路郵政局)	1963		Gillies Avenue North, Hung Hom	Philately center.	
Ho Man Tin (何文田郵政局)	2002		Ho Man Tin Estate, Ho Man Tin		
Hung Hom Bay (紅磡灣郵政局)	1989		Cherry Mansion, Whampoa Garden, Hung Hom	Philately center.	
Kowloon Bay (九龍灣郵政局)	1982		1/F, Hongkong Post Building, Wang Kee Street, Kowloon Bay	In March 2024, this post office moved into the new Hongkong Post Building.	
Kowloon Central (九龍中央郵政局)	July 1898		Kowloon Government Offices, Nathan Road, Yau Ma Tei	This post office was originally at the Kowloon Wharf Dockyard. It closed during World War II when Hong Kong was under Japanese occupation, reopening on 22 January 1942. It moved to a new building in 1967. Philately center.	
Kowloon City (九龍城郵政局)			Lung Kong Road, Kowloon City	This post office closed during World War II when Hong Kong was under Japanese occupation, reopening on 14 February 1942. It moved to a new building in 1959. Philately center.	
Kowloon East (東九龍郵政局)	1985		Kowloon East Government Offices Building, Lei Yue Mun Road, Kwun Tong		
Kwong Wa Street (廣華街郵政局)	1988		Kwong Fai Mansion, Kwong Wa Street, Mong Kok	Philately center.	
Kwun Tong (觀塘郵政局)			52 Hung To Road, Kwun Tong	This post office closed during World War II when Hong Kong was under Japanese occupation, reopening on 15 November 1942. It moved to its current location on 19 March 2012. Philately center.	
Lai Kok (麗閣郵政局)	1982		Lai Kok Estate, Cheung Sha Wan		
Lam Tin (藍田郵政局)	2001		Kai Tin Estate, Lam Tin		
Lok Fu (樂富郵政局)	1986		Lok Fu Estate, Wang Tau Hom	This post office moved to its current location in 2011.	
Mei Foo Sun Chuen (美孚新邨郵政局)	2005		West Rail line Mei Foo station, Kowloon		
Mong Kok (旺角郵政局)	1993		Mongkok Exchange, Bute Street, Mong Kok	Philately center.	
Ngau Chi Wan (牛池灣郵政局)	1981		Choi Wan Estate, Ngau Chi Wan		
Ngau Tau Kok (牛頭角郵政局)	1986		Ngau Tau Kok	This post office moved to its current location in 2016.	
Oi Man (愛民郵政局)	1980		Oi Man Estate, Ho Man Tin	This post office moved to its current location in 2011	
Sau Mau Ping (秀茂坪郵政局)	2003		Sau Mau Ping Estate, Sau Ming Road, Sau Mau Ping		
Sham Shui Po (深水埗郵政局)			Un Chau Street, Sham Shui Po	This post office closed during World War II when Hong Kong was under Japanese occupation, reopening on 14 February 1942. It moved to a new building in 1986. Philately center.	
Shek Kip Mei (石硤尾郵政局)	2006		Shek Kip Mei Estate, Shek Kip Mei		
Shun Lee (順利郵政局)	1981		Shun Lee Estate, Shun Lee		
So Uk (蘇屋郵政局)	2018		Shop No. 2, Free Standing Block No. 2, So Uk Estate, Sham Shui Po	This post office opened on 5 February 2018, and replaced the Lei Cheng Uk Post Office	
Tai Kok Tsui (大角咀郵政局)	1989		Anchor Street, Tai Kok Tsui		
To Kwa Wan (土瓜灣郵政局)	1994		Hang Chien Court, Wyler Garden, Mei King Street, To Kwa Wan	Philately center.	
Tsim Sha Tsui (尖沙咀郵政局)	1983		Hermes House, 10 Middle Road, Tsim Sha Tsui	In 1979, this post office was the location of a "near riot" when 8,000 copies of a first day cover sold out in three hours, leading angry customers to break windows. Philately center.	
Tsz Wan Shan (慈雲山郵政局)	1998		Yuk Wah Street, Tsz Wan Shan		
Wong Tai Sin (黃大仙郵政局)	1987		Lower Wong Tai Sin Estate, Wong Tai Sin		
Yau Tong (油塘郵政局)	2003		Yau Tong Estate, Yau Tong		
Yau Yat Tsuen (又一村郵政局)	1967		Fa Po Street, Yau Yat Tsuen, Kowloon Tong		

=== Post offices in the New Territories ===
Following are the active post offices for the New Territories.

Name	Established	Image	Location	Notes	Ref.
Butterfly (蝴蝶郵政局)	1985		Butterfly Estate, Tuen Mun	Philately center.	
Choi Ming (彩明郵政局)	2004		Choi Ming Court, Tseung Kwan O		
Cheung Fat (長發郵政局)	1990		Cheung Fat Estate, Tsing Yi	Philately center.	
City One Shatin (沙田第一城郵政局)	1988		City One Plaza, Sha Tin, Sha Tin District	Philately center. This was called Yuen Chau Kok before 2005.	
Fairview Park (錦繡花園郵政局)	1984		Fairview Park, San Tin		
Fanling (粉嶺郵政局)	1990		North District Government Offices Building, Fanling		
Fo Tan (火炭郵政局)	1991		Shan Mei Street, Fo Tan, Sha Tin District		
Fu Shin (富善郵政局)	1988		Fu Shin Estate, Tai Po		
Fu Tai (富泰郵政局)	2001		Fu Tai Estate, Tuen Mun		
Heng On (恒安郵政局)	1990		Heng On Estate, Ma On Shan, Sha Tin District	This post office moved to its current location in 2014.	
Hin Keng (顯徑郵政局)	1989		Hin Keng Estate, Tai Wai, Sha Tin District	Philately center.	
Kam Tai (錦泰郵政局)	2004		Kam Tai Court, Ma On Shan, Sha Tin District		
Kam Tin (錦田郵政局)	1965		Kam Tin Government Offices Building, Kam Tin		
Kwai Chung (葵涌郵政局)	1998		Kwai Chung Estate, Kwai Chung		
Kwai Fong (葵芳郵政局)	1993		Kwai Fong Estate, Kwai Fong		
Kwai Shing (葵盛郵政局)	1980		Kwai Shing West Estate, Kwai Shing		
Kwong Yuen (廣源郵政局)	1992		Kwong Yuen Estate, Siu Lek Yuen, Sha Tin District		
Lai King (荔景郵政局)	1976		Lai King Estate, Kwai Chung		
Lee On (利安郵政局)	1993		Lee On Estate, Ma On Shan		
Lei Muk Shue (梨木樹郵政局)	2000		Lei Muk Shue Estate, Tsuen Wan		
Leung King (良景郵政局)	1990		Shop No. L105, Level 1, Leung King Shopping Centre, Leung King Estate, Tuen Mun	This post office was relocated from Shop No. 106, G/F, Leung King Shopping Centre, Leung King Estate, Tuen Mun to its current location in June 2011.	
Ma On Shan (馬鞍山郵政局)	1997		Sunshine City Phase 4, On Luk Street, Ma On Shan, Sha Tin District	Philately center.	
Mei Lam (美林郵政局)	15 November 1982		Shop No. 35-37, First floor, Mei Lam Commercial Centre, Mei Lam Estate, Tai Wai, Sha Tin District		
Po Lam (寶琳郵政局)	1990		Po Lam Estate, Tseung Kwan O		
Sai Kung (西貢郵政局)	1984		Sai Kung Government Offices Building, Chan Man Street, Sai Kung	Philately center.	
San Tin (新田郵政局)	1964		Castle Peak Road, San Tin	In 1997, workers at this branch came up with an illegal scheme to profit from first day stamp releases, collecting around CA$88,000.	
Sha Kok (沙角郵政局)	1982		Sha Kok Estate, Sha Tin Wai, Sha Tin District		
Sha Tau Kok (沙頭角郵政局)	1962		Sha Tau Kok Government Offices Building, Sha Tau Kok Road, Sha Tau Kok	This is the only post office that is inside the Frontier Closed Area.	
Sha Tin Central (沙田中央郵政局)	2002		Sha Tin Government Offices, Sha Tin, Sha Tin District	Philately center	
Shek Lei (石籬郵政局)	1999		Shek Lei Estate, Kwai Chung		
Shek Wai Kok (石圍角郵政局)	1983		Shek Wai Kok Estate, Tsuen Wan		
Shek Wu Hui (石湖墟郵政局)	1959		San Fung Avenue, Shek Wu Hui, Sheung Shui	Philately center.	
Sheung Tak (尚德郵政局)	1999		Sheung Tak Estate, Tseung Kwan O		
Sun Chui (新翠郵政局)	1984		Sun Chui Estate, Tai Wai, Sha Tin District		
Tai Hing (大興郵政局)	1981		Tai Hing Estate, Tuen Mun		
Tai Po (大埔郵政局)			Tai Po Government Offices Building, Tai Po	This post office closed during World War II when Hong Kong was under Japanese occupation, and reopened on 26 March 1942. It moved to its current location in 1979. Philately center.	
Tin Yiu (天耀郵政局)	1992		Tin Yiu Estate, Tin Shui Wai	This post office moved to a new location in 2008	
Tin Yuet (天悅郵政局)	2002		Tin Yuet Estate, Tin Shui Wai		
Tseung Kwan O (將軍澳郵政局)	2017		Shop 14C, G/F, Ming Tak Shopping Centre, Ming Tak Estate, Tseung Kwan O	Replaced Tseung Kwan O Post Office at TKO Gateway, Hau Tak Estate. Philately center.	
Tsing Yi (青衣郵政局)	1982		Cheung Hong Estate, Tsing Yi		
Tsuen Wan (荃灣郵政局)	1992		Tsuen Wan Government Offices Building, Sai Lau Kok Road, Tsuen Wan	Philately center.	
Tsuen Wan West (荃灣西郵政局)	1992		Bayview Garden, Castle Peak Road, Tsuen Wan		
Tuen Mun Central (屯門中央郵政局)	1989		Library and Post Office Building, Tuen Mun	Philately center.	
Wah Ming (華明郵政局)	1991		Wah Ming Estate, Fanling	This post office moved to a new location in 2018.	
Wan Tau Tong (運頭塘郵政局)	1992		Wan Tau Tong Estate, Tai Po		
Wo Che (禾輋郵政局)	1988		Tak Hau Street, Wo Che Estate, Sha Tin, Sha Tin District		
Yeung Uk Road (楊屋道郵政局)	21 April 2008		IndiHome, Yeung Uk Road, Tsuen Wan		
Yuen Long (元朗郵政局)	2002		Hop Yick Plaza, 23 Tai Tong Road, Yuen Long	This post office relocated from Sau Fu Street to Yuen Long Pau Cheung Square on 30 December 2002. It moved to its current location in Hop Yick Plaza on Tai Tong Road on 28 September 2020. Philately center.	

=== Post offices on the Outlying Islands ===
Following is a list of the active post offices in the Outlying Islands.

Name	Established	Image	Location	Notes	Ref.
Airport (機場郵政局)	1998		Terminal 1, Hong Kong International Airport, Chek Lap Kok	Philately center.	
Cheung Chau (長洲郵政局)	1991		Regional Council Cheung Chau Complex, Cheung Chau	Philately center.	
Discovery Bay (愉景灣郵政局)	1998		Discovery Bay Plaza, Discovery Bay, Lantau Island		
Lamma (南丫郵政局)	1984		Main Street, Yung Shue Wan, Lamma Island		
Mui Wo (梅窩郵政局)	1990		Mui Wo Government Offices Building, Mui Wo, Lantau Island		
Peng Chau (坪洲郵政局)	1961		Government Building, Peng Chau		
Tai O (大澳郵政局)	1962		Tai O Government Building, Tai O, Lantau Island		
Tung Chung (東涌郵政局)	2000		Mei Tung Street, Tung Chung, Lantau Island		

=== Mobile post offices ===
There are currently three mobile post office units in Hong Kong that primarily serve the remote and outlying areas in the New Territories.

Name	Established	Image	Districts served	Notes	Ref.
Mobile Post Office No. 1			Islands District, North, Tai Po, Tsuen Wan, Tuen Mun, and Yuen Long		
Mobile Post Office No. 2			Sai Kung, Sha Tin, Sham Shui Po, Tai Po, Tsuen Wan, and Yuen Long		
Mobile Post Office No. 3	April 2015		Lok Wah North Estate, Kwun Tong	Replaced the Lok Wah Post Office with reduced opening sessions (three mornings a week).	

== Defunct post offices ==
Following is an incomplete list of the defunct post offices in Hong Kong.

Name	Dates of operation	Image	Location	Notes	Ref.
Airport (機場郵政局)	1962 – 5 July 1998		Kai Tak Airport, Kai Tak	This post office closed when the Kai Tak Airport was closed and demolished.	
Canton Road (廣東道郵政局)	1971 – 1 January 2008		393 Canton Road, Jordan	This post office closed due to low utilisation and heavy operational losses. It was located in the Canton Road Government Offices, which were demolished in 2011.	
Cloud View Road (雲景道郵政局)	1983 – 1 January 2016		Cloud View Road, Hong Kong	This post office closed due to low utilisation and heavy operational losses.	
Cyberport (數碼港郵政局)	2003 – 7 October 2021		Cyberport Road, Aberdeen	The post office closed when Hongkong Post declined to renew its lease in Cyberport.	
Garden Road (花園道郵政局)	2002 – 1 November 2007		Cheung Kong Centre, Queen's Road, Central	This post office closed due to low utilisation and heavy operational losses.	
General Post Office (First) (aka Old Central Government Offices)	1841–1846		Garden Road, above St. John's Cathedral	This was the first post office location in Hong Kong, which served as the General Post Office, until it moved to the Queen's Road Central location.	
General Post Office (Second)	January 1, 1846 – 1911		Queen's Road and Wyndham Street	This was the second location of the General Post Office. It was converted from a former Dent & Co tea exchange building and also housed the Government Treasury and the Supreme Court. It was replaced by the Des Voeux Road Central location.	
General Post Office (Third)	1911–1976		Pedder Street and Des Voeux Road Central	This was the third location of the General Post Office, a purpose-built granite and brick Neoclassical structure and landmark that was nicknamed "the Old Lady of Pedder Street". It was demolished to make way for the construction of the MTR Central station, and the General Post Office moved to its current location at Connaught Place.	
Granville Road (加連威老道郵政局)	24 August 1983 – 27 August 2022		Albion Plaza, Granville Road, Tsim Sha Tsui	Once a large post office, this location was downgraded to a medium-sized post office in 2019 based on declining use. In 2021-22, its usage fell below the requirement for a medium-sized post office. Its closure considered that its service area overlapped with Kowloon Central and Tsim Sha Tsui Post Offices.	
Harbour Building (海港政府大樓郵政局)	1985 – 1 November 2007		Harbour Building, Pier Road, Central	This post office closed due to low utilisation and heavy operational losses.	
Harcourt Road			Harcourt Road, Admiralty		
Hennessy Road (軒尼詩道郵政局)	1969 – 1 December 2012		G/F, Asian House, 1 Hennessy Road, Wan Chai	The post office was closed due to the redevelopment of Asian House, the building where it was located. It was replaced by the Johnston Road Post Office. Philately center.	
International Mail Centre (國際郵件中心郵政局)	June 1980 – 8 March 2014		80 Salisbury Road, Hung Hom	This facility was demolished and replaced by the Central Mail Centre in Kowloon Bay because of a railway construction project.	
Lei Cheng Uk (李鄭屋郵政局)	1972 – 5 February 2018		Shop 114, G/F, Lei Cheng Uk Shopping Centre, Lei Cheng Uk Estate, Sham Shui Po	This post office was replaced by the So Uk Post Office	
Lok Wah (樂華郵政局)	1989 – 13 April 2015		Lok Wah North Estate, Kwun Tong, Ngau Tau Kok	This post office was closed due to low utilisation and heavy operational losses. It was replaced by a mobile post office in April 2015.	
North Point (北角郵政局)	2002 – 18 May 2008		FitFort, King's Road, North Point	This post office was closed due to operational losses	
On Ting (安定郵政局)	1994 – 1 January 2016		On Ting Estate, Tuen Mun	This post office was closed due to low utilisation and heavy operational losses	
Queen's Road (皇后大道郵政局)	2004 – 21 October 2017		The Center, Queen's Road Central, Central	This post office was closed due to low utilisation and heavy operational losses. However, its closure was contentious, with district councilors coming to a physical altercation over the vote.	
San Po Kong (新蒲崗郵政局)	2006 – 30 May 2015		Yue Xiu Plaza, Ning Yuen Street, San Po Kong	This post office was replaced by the Concorde Road Post Office	
Sheung Wan	1 April 1914 – 1936		Old Harbour Office Building, Morrison Street, Sheung Wan	The building was demolished on 31 December 1936.	
Texaco Road (德士古道郵政局)	1993 – 20 April 2008		Wealthy Garden, Texaco Road, Tsuen Wan	This post office was closed because of its severely deteriorated premises. It was replaced by Yeung Uk Road Post Office.	
Tseung Kwan O (將軍澳郵政局)	1994 - 4 February 2017		Shop No. E030-E032, G/F, East Wing, TKO Gateway, Hau Tak Estate, Tseung Kwan O	Replaced by Tseung Kwan O Post Office at Ming Tak Shopping Centre	
Wan Chai Post Office (舊灣仔郵政局)	1 March 1915 – 199x ?		221 Queen's Road East, Wan Chai	This building became a Declared monuments of Hong Kong on 18 May 1990. In 1993, it became the Wan Chai Environmental Resource Centre.	
Wantsai			Queen's Road East, Wan Chai		
Western Branch	1 July 1898		Old Harbour Office, Western Market North Block	This post office was originally located at 111 Praya West. On 17 July 1903, this location closed, and the building was demolished. It reopened at theCanton Wharf on 1 July 1906. Finally, it moved to the Old Harbour Office on 1 April 1914.	
Wong Chuk Hang (黃竹坑郵政局)	1975 – 30 September 2007		Wong Chuk Hang Estate, Wong Chuk Hang	This post office closed when the Wong Chuk Hang Estate was demolished.	
Yau Ma Te (油蔴地郵政局)	Before 1924 - 1967		Yau Ma Te Engine House and Boiler Pumping Station, Waterloo Road, Yau Me Te	The post office was located in the former Engine House and Boiler House pumping station. It opened in the 1910s–1920s, closed during World War II when Hong Kong was under Japanese occupation, reopening on 14 February 1942. It ceased operation in 1967.	
Yuan Long (元朗郵政局)				This post office closed during World War II when Hong Kong was under Japanese occupation, reopening on 26 March 1942.	

== Other postal buildings ==
Name	Established	Image	Location	Notes	Ref.
Air Mail Centre (空郵中心)	6 July 1998		9 Catering Road West, Chek Lap Kok, Lantau	This 40,000 square feet (3,700 m^{2}) building is adjacent to Hong Kong International Airport and operates 24 hours a day. It handles	
Central Mail Centre (中央郵件中心)	2014		1 Wang Chin Street, Kowloon Bay, New Kowloon	This building was designed by Ronald Lu and Partners and was completed in 2013.	
Hongkong Post Headquarters	March 2024		Hongkong Post Building, Wang Kee Street, Kowloon Bay	This is the fifth headquarters of Hongkong Post. The building also includes the Kowloon Bay Post Office.	
