= Kowloon Central =

Kowloon Central may refer to:

- the central part of Kowloon, Hong Kong
- Kowloon Central (2021 constituency)
- Kowloon Central (1995 constituency)
- Kowloon Central (1991 constituency)

== See also ==
- Central Kowloon Health Centre, aka Central Kowloon Clinic
- Central Kowloon Route
- Kowloon Central Cluster of the Hospital Authority
- Kowloon Central Post Office
