= Ernest Matthews =

Ernest Matthews may refer to:

- Ernest R. Matthews (1873–1930), British civil engineer
- Ernie Matthews (1912–2009), English footballer
