= Windsor House (Hong Kong) =

Building in Causeway Bay, Hong Kong

Coordinates: 22.2804°N 114.1865°E

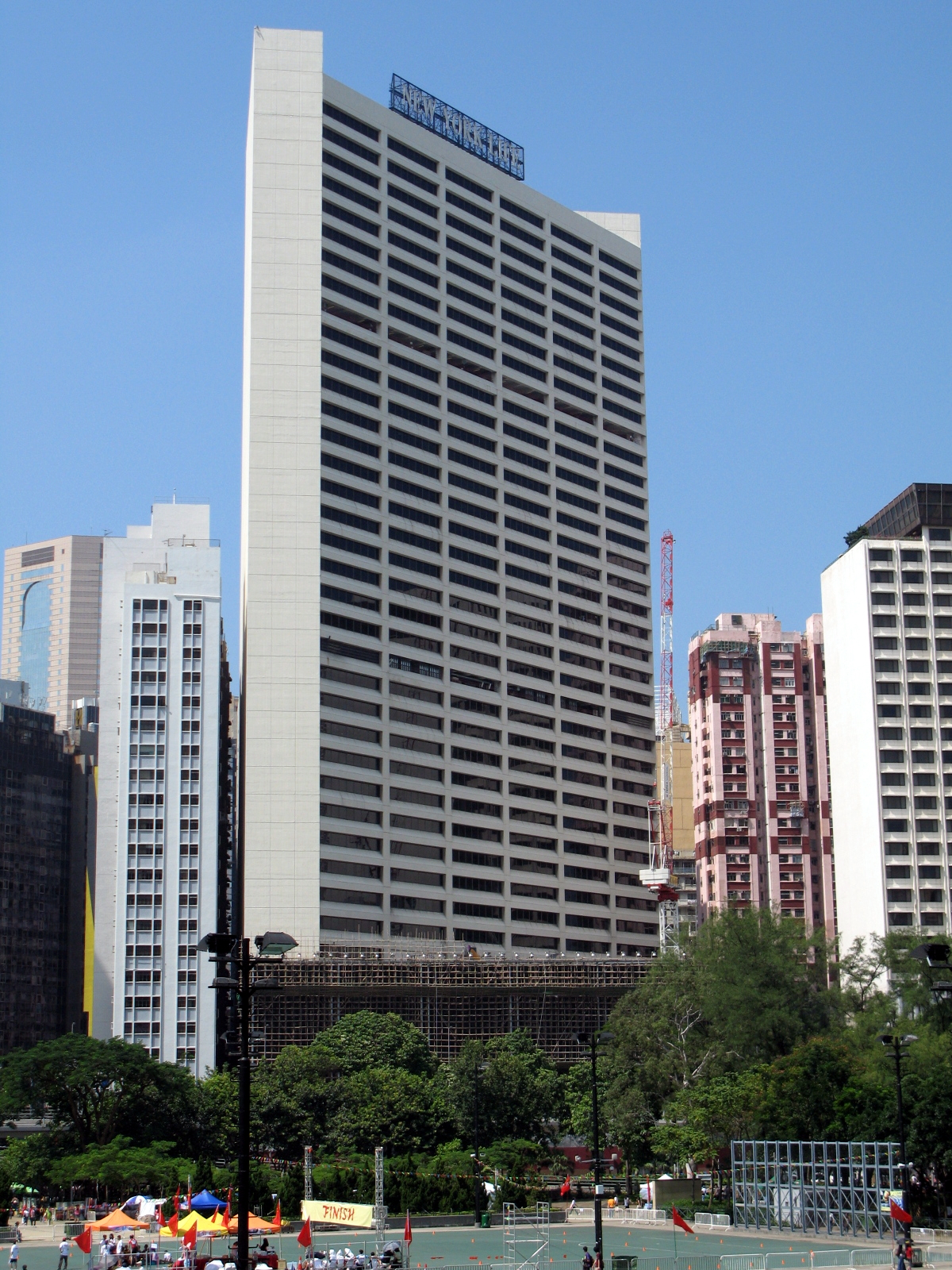
- Windsor House in 2008
- Interactive map of the Windsor House area

General information
- Status: Completed
- Type: Office, retail
- Architectural style: Modernist
- Location: 311 Gloucester Road, Causeway Bay, Hong Kong
- Construction started: 15 April 1978; 48 years ago
- Topped-out: 3 July 1979; 47 years ago
- Owner: Joseph Lau

Design and construction
- Architecture firm: Palmer and Turner
- Developer: Hongkong Land
- Main contractor: Gammon Construction

Website
- windsorhouse.hk

Windsor House
- Chinese: 皇室堡
Transcriptions
Standard Mandarin
- Hanyu Pinyin: Huángshì Bǎo
Yue: Cantonese
- Jyutping: Wong4 sat1 bou2

Windsor House is a commercial development located on Gloucester Road in Causeway Bay, Hong Kong, comprising a shopping centre with an office tower above.

== History ==
Windsor House was built on the site of former Dairy Farm cold stores. Developer Hongkong Land acquired the land when it acquired Dairy Farm in 1972, and originally planned to build a hotel on the site. The cold stores were demolished in July 1976 and the site was temporarily used as a public car park.

The new Windsor House was designed by Hong Kong architecture firm Palmer and Turner. It bore the same name as another Hongkong Land building, on Des Voeux Road Central, that was being demolished as part of the company's major redevelopment of their older properties in Central. The building is angled diagonally (relative to the street grid) in order to maximise views of Victoria Park from the office floors. In the 1990s, the building was said to comprise about 688,000 square feet (63,900 m^{2}) of office space and 124,300 square feet (11,550 m^{2}) of retail accommodation.

A contract to construct the first phase of the building was signed on 14 April 1978 by Hongkong Land and Gammon Construction, and work began on the following day, 15 April 1978. A topping out ceremony was held on 3 July 1979. The initial anchor tenant was the Inland Revenue Department, which leased about a third of the office space at Windsor House to centralise departments that had been scattered across a number of different office buildings. The building has two service cores – housing lifts, stairwells, toilets, and other uses – which flank the office floors. Part of the reason for including a second service core was that the Inland Revenue Department wanted its own entrance and lifts. The Inland Revenue Department later moved to the government-owned Revenue Tower in order to save on rental costs.

In September 1987, Chinese Estates acquired two properties from Hongkong Land, Windsor House and Harcourt House, for HK$2.38 billion. Windsor House was said to constitute $1.6 billion of this sum. The retail podium was renovated in 1992. At this time the first to ninth floors of the office tower, which had been vacated by the Inland Revenue Department, were converted to dining and entertainment use.

When the building first opened, the retail podium housed a Lane Crawford department store. In mid-1997, when their lease at Windsor House expired, Lane Crawford moved to nearby Times Square, owned by parent company Wharf, due to high rents as well as projected higher sales at the new location.

The retail podium was extensively renovated from 2007 to 2010. In December 2015 it was announced that Chinese Estates would sell Windsor House to its largest shareholder, the tycoon and fugitive Joseph Lau, for $12 billion.

== Shopping centre ==
The podium levels have numerous shops, dining outlets, and the Grand Windsor Cinema, operated by MCL Cinemas.

Notable retail tenants include Bershka, FANCL Corporation, G.U., Hallmark Cards, Mannings, Pull&Bear, Sa Sa, Sephora, and Toys "R" Us.

It is also home to the Causeway Bay Post Office, located on the 10th floor.

== Transport ==
The building is a short walk from Exit E of Causeway Bay station, as well as the Paterson Street/Pennington Street stop of the Hong Kong Tramways.
