= Chadwick Professor of Civil Engineering =

Professorship at University College London

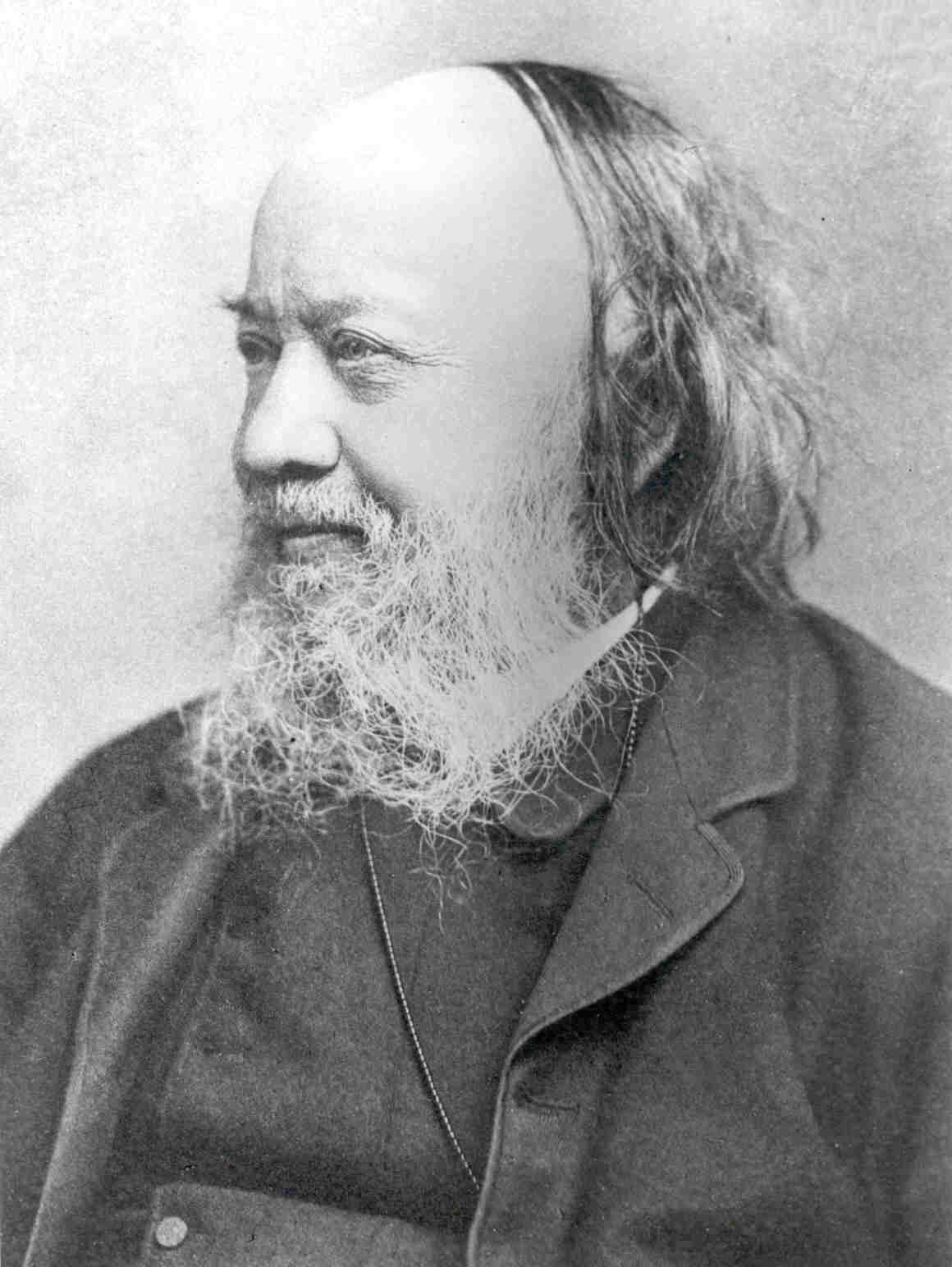
Sir Edwin Chadwick, who the professorship is named after

The Chadwick Professor of Civil Engineering is a professorship at University College London. It is named after Sir Edwin Chadwick, a Victorian social reformer who worked to improve sanitation conditions. The professorship was established in 1898 as the Chadwick Professorship of Municipal Engineering, with Edwin Chadwick's son Osbert Chadwick serving as the first professor.

== Chadwick Professors of Municipal Engineering ==
- Osbert Chadwick (1898-1911)
- Ernest R. Matthews
- M T M Ormsby (-1935)

== Chadwick Professors of Civil Engineering ==
- H J Collins (1936-61)
- Henry Chilver (1961-69)
- Kenneth Kemp (1969-84)
- Kenneth Ives (1984-1992)
- James Croll (1992-2004)
- Nick Tyler (2004- Present)
