= Chadwick Lakes =

Dams in Malta

Coordinates: 35.8919°N 14.3900°E

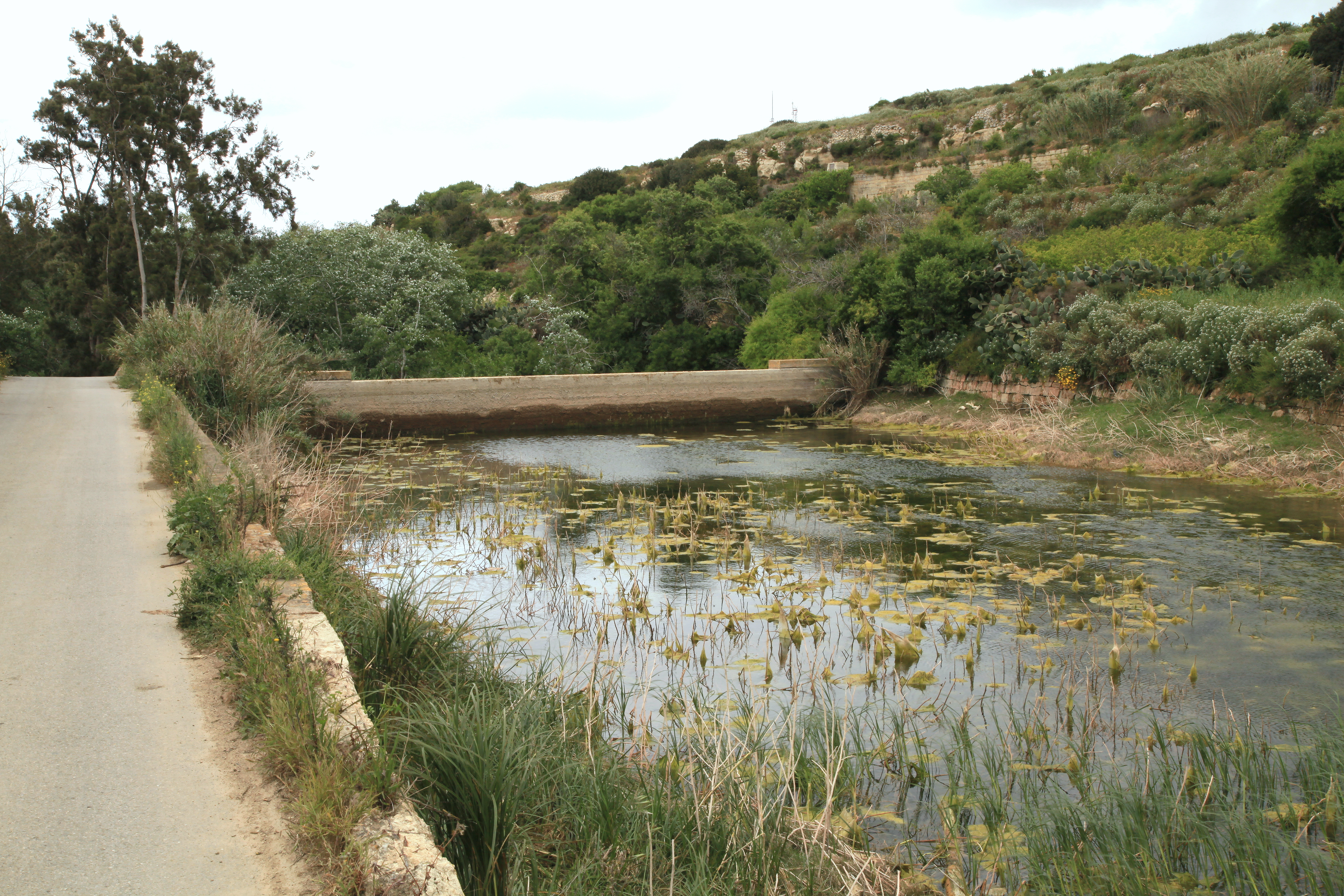
One of the dams surrounded by fields, in Rabat

Chadwick are a number of dams, pouring into each other, on the island of Malta. The area is locally known as Wied il-Qlejgħa (Qliegħa Valley). Their location extends from Qliegħa Valley in the limits of Mtarfa and Rabat, to Għasel Valley (Wied il-Għasel) in the peripheries of Mosta. It consists of a complex system of well-planned small dams, draining into Speranza Valley, and then into the sea at Salina Bay.

== History ==
The lakes are formed behind a number of dams constructed by Sir Osbert Chadwick, a British engineer, in the late 19th century. The water drains into Wied Speranza and ends at the sea at Salina Bay. The valley provides farmers with water to irrigate their land. Wied il-Qliegħa is only full during the winter months. During this period, the lakes are abundant with life. Biodiversity includes several indigenous plants, insects, tadpoles/frogs and crustaceans.

Chadwick Lakes lie along Malta's only freshwater stream big enough to be called a rivulet, providing a tranquil environment for people to enjoy.

In February 2009, Matthew Psaila a 19 year old gunner, drowned during an Armed Forces of Malta training exercise in Wied il-Qliegħa. This particular exercise is part of the C Company's training syllabus and had been practiced for several years.

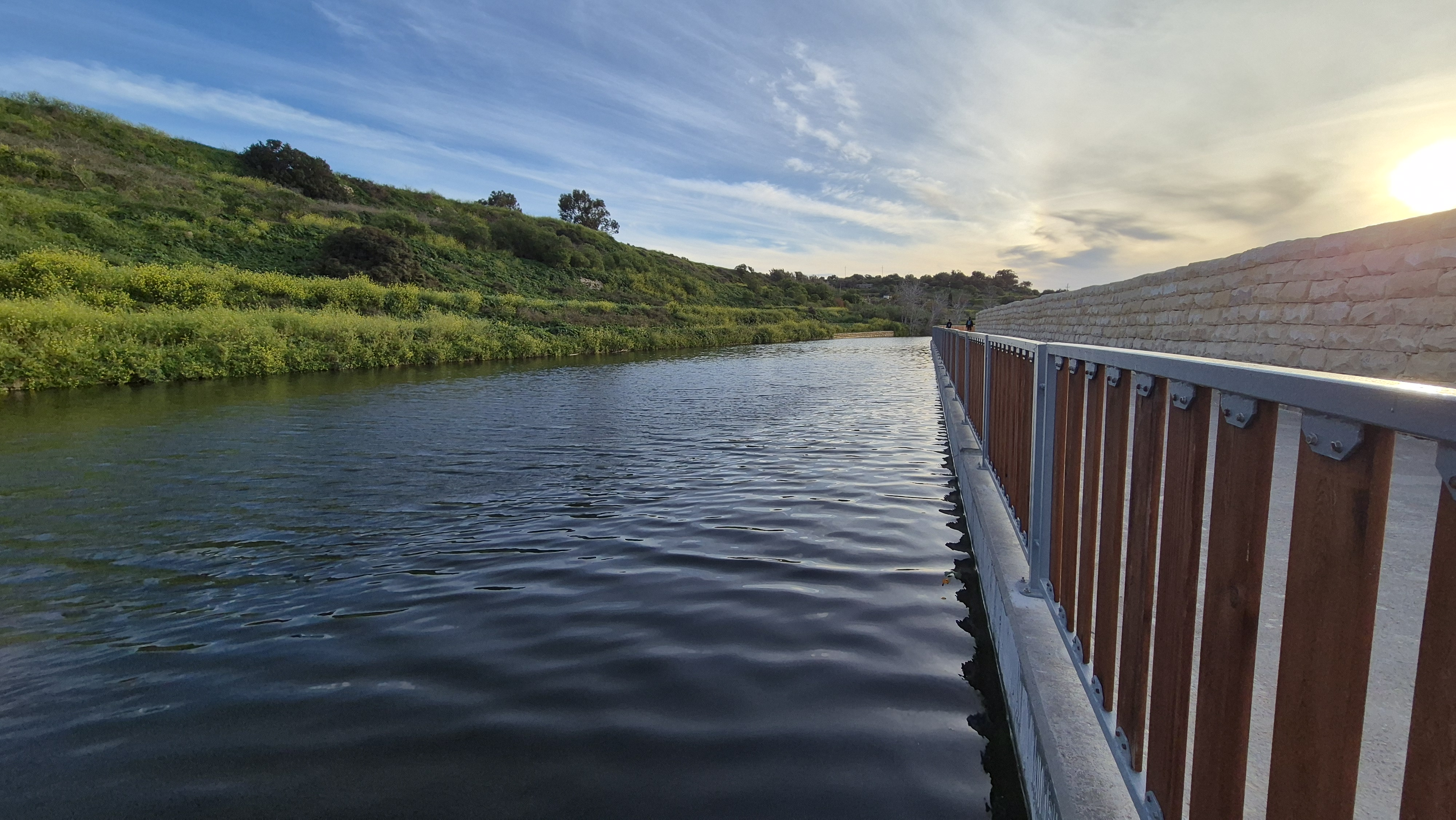
View of one of the reservoirs after heavy rainfall

As of 2018, Chadwick Lakes has been a site of particular interest to biodiversity and conservation specialists as the presence of alien species of crayfish is putting significant pressure on the local environment via predation and habitat destruction.
