= Babita Chauhan =

Indian politician

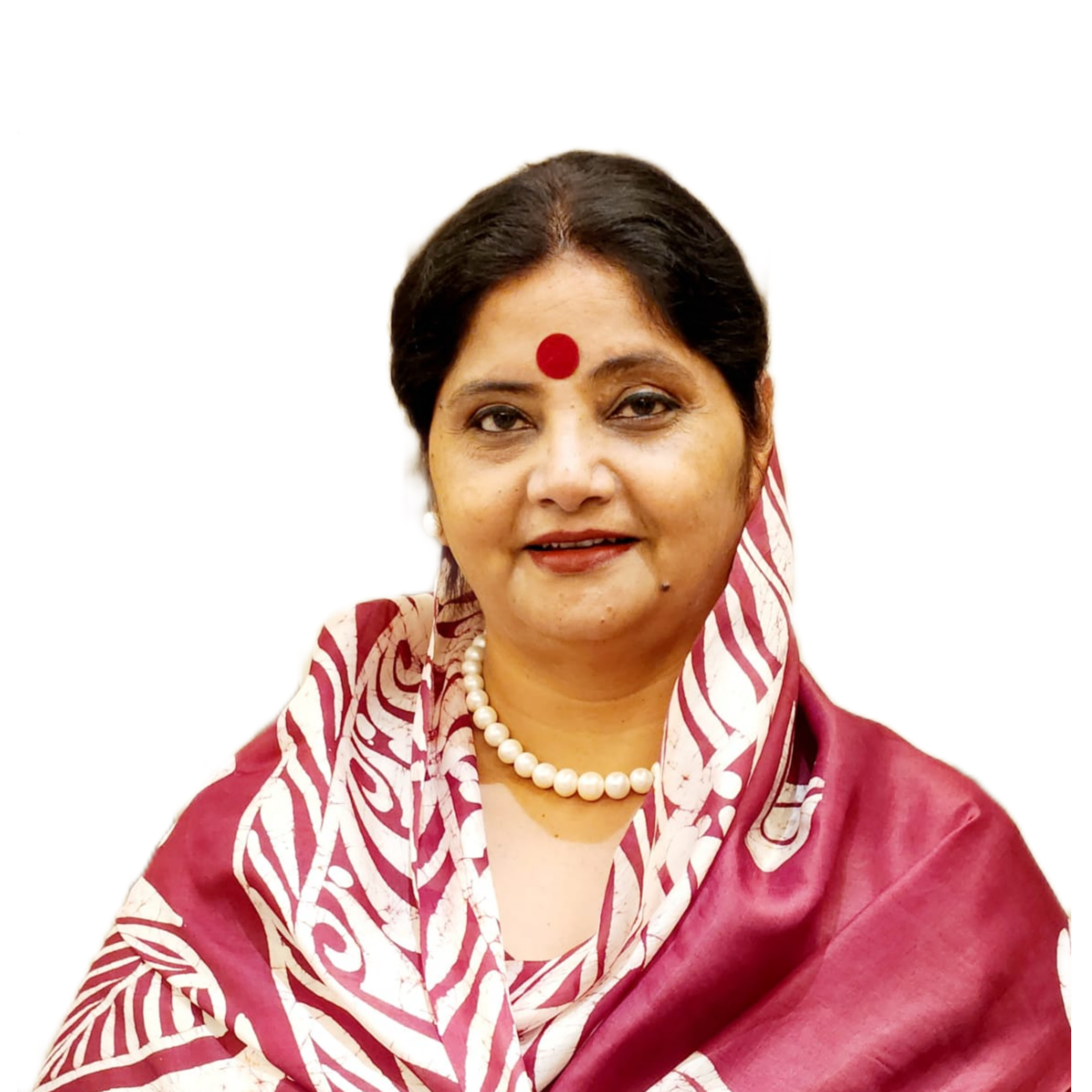
- Chauhan in 2024

Chairperson Uttar Pradesh State Women Commission
- Incumbent
- Assumed office 2025

Personal details
- Born: Agra, Uttar Pradesh.
- Profession: Politician

Babita Chauhan is an Indian politician serving as the chairperson of the Uttar Pradesh State Women's Commission as of late 2025.

== Political career ==
Appointed in September 2024 for a one-year term, she superseded others for the top post, with Aparna Yadav appointed as vice-chairperson.

She is a member of the Zila Panchayat from Kheragarh, Agra.
