= Engineer's Office of the Former Pumping Station =

Coordinates: 22.31234°N 114.16964°E

Engineer's Office of the Former Pumping Station, Water Supplies Department
- 前水務署抽水站工程師辦公室
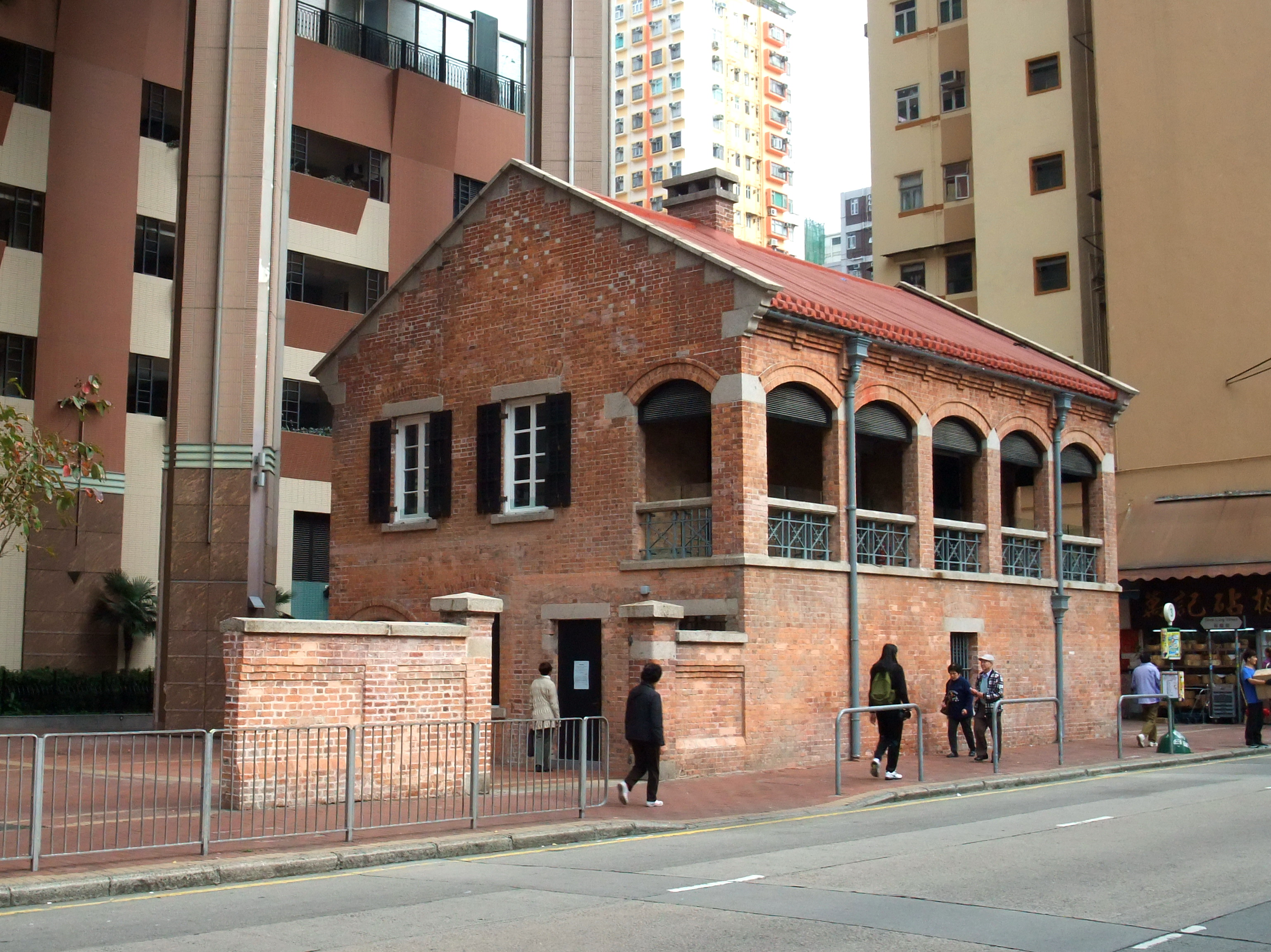
- Interactive map of the Engineer's Office of the Former Pumping Station, Water Supplies Department area
- Alternative names: The Red Brick House (紅磚房)

General information
- Type: Pumping station
- Architectural style: Colonial Neo-Classical style
- Location: Hong Kong, No. 344 Shanghai Street, Yau Ma Tei, Kowloon
- Completed: 1895
- Owner: HKSAR Government

Technical details
- Floor count: 2

Design and construction
- Engineer: Osbert Chadwick

Hong Kong Graded Building – Grade I
- Designated: 2000

Engineer's Office of the Former Pumping Station
- Traditional Chinese: 前水務署抽水站工程師辦公室
- Simplified Chinese: 前水务署抽水站工程师办公室
Transcriptions
Standard Mandarin
- Hanyu Pinyin: Qián Shuǐwùshǔ Chōushuǐzhàn Gōngchéngshī Bàngōngshì
Yue: Cantonese
- Yale Romanization: Chìhn séui mouh chyúh chāu séui jaahm gūng chìhng sī baahn gūng sāt
- Jyutping: Cin4 seoi2 mou6 cyu5 cau1 seoi2 zaam6 gung1 cing4 si1 baan6 gung1 sat1

The Red Brick House
- Traditional Chinese: 紅磚屋
- Simplified Chinese: 红砖屋
Transcriptions
Standard Mandarin
- Hanyu Pinyin: Hóngzhuānwū
Yue: Cantonese
- Yale Romanization: Hùhng jyun ūk
- Jyutping: Hung4 zyun uk1

The Engineer's Office of the Former Pumping Station, Water Supplies Department, sometimes called "The Red Brick House", is located at No. 344 Shanghai Street, in Yau Ma Tei, Hong Kong. It has been classified as a Grade I historical building since 2000 by the Antiquities Advisory Board in view of its historical and architectural merit. It is now owned by the HKSAR Government.

== History ==
The Engineer's Office is the only remaining building of the former Pumping Station (舊水務署抽水站), which was built in 1895. It is the oldest pumping station in Hong Kong, even older than Tai Tam Tuk Pumping Station (大潭篤泵房), which was constructed in 1917.

In 1890, Osbert Chadwick, consulting engineer of the Crown Agents, proposed the building plan for a water supply system in Kowloon. He suggested collecting subterranean water by building underground mud barriers. Although his proposal was not adopted immediately, it contributed to the construction of this pumping station subsequently.

Originally, the pumping station was a complex which comprised three two-storey buildings and a tall chimney for the boiler. The first building consisted an engine house and a boiler house. The second building had a workshop on the ground floor and fitters' quarters on the first floor. Between the first building and the second building was a chimney. For the third building, an office, a store, a boy and coolie room, a cook House and a latrine are the components of the ground floor, while there was overseers' quarters on the first floor.

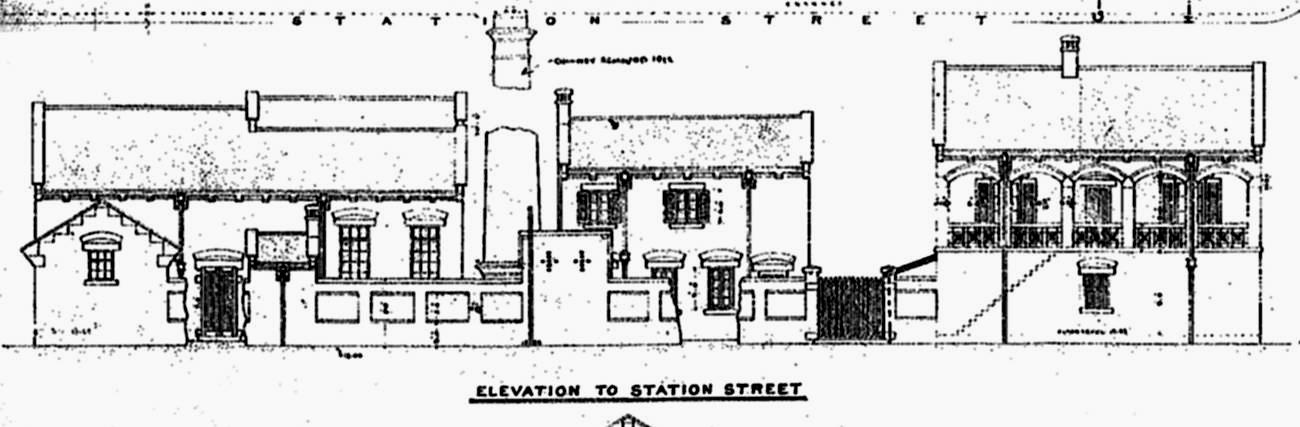
Elevation of the Yau Ma Tei Pumping Station on Station Street (today's Shanghai Street) from the set of original architectural drawings recovered from Water Supplies Department. (Starting from the left: 1. First building: Engine House and Boiler House; 2. The Chimney; 3. Second building: Fitters' Quarters and Workshop; 4. Third building: Overseers' Quarters, Office and Store)

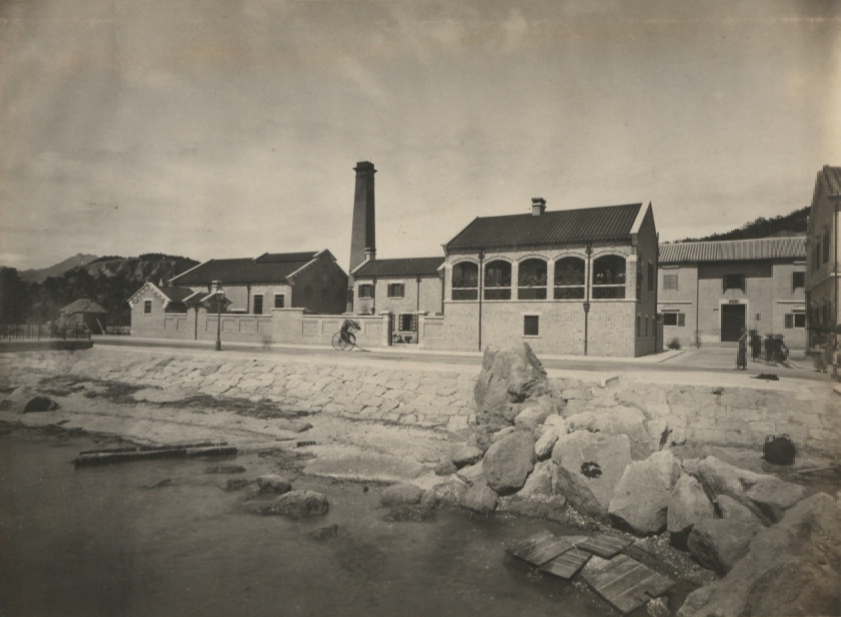
Historical image of Yau Ma Tei Pumping Station.

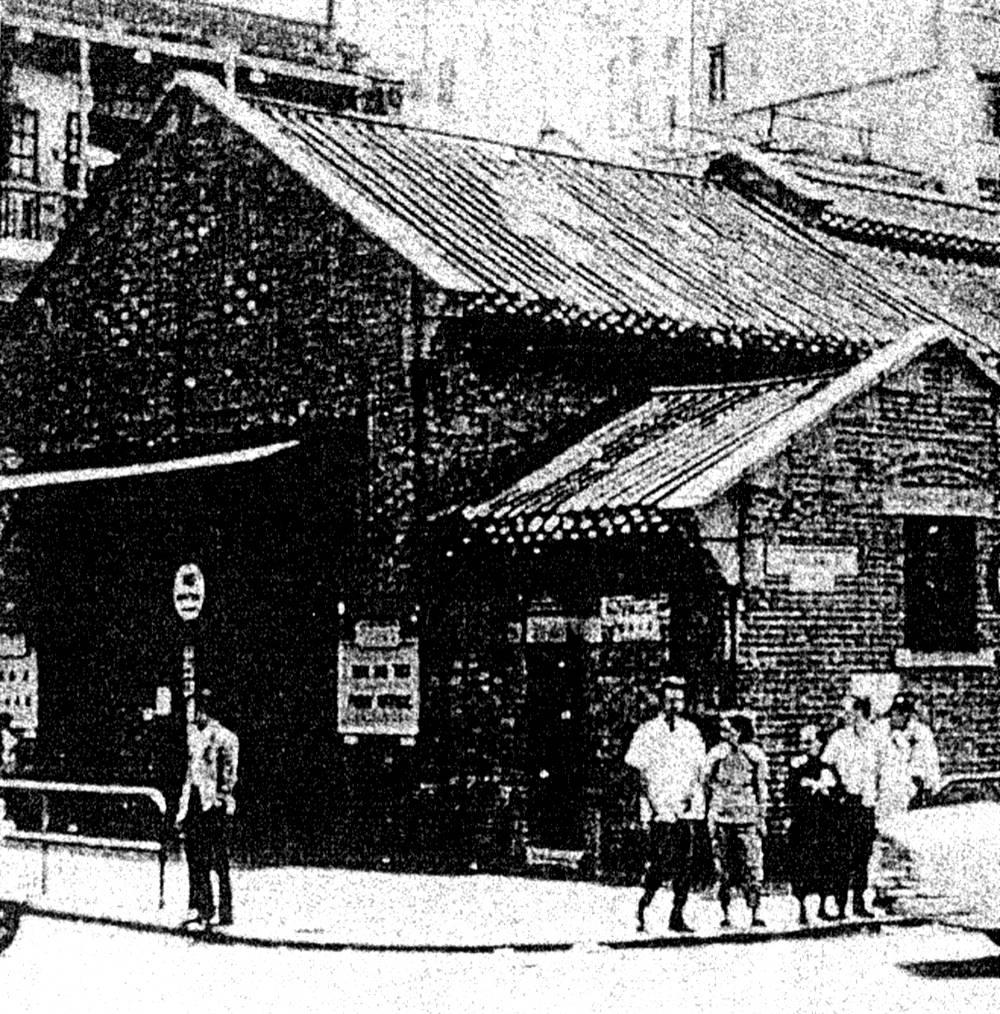
The engine house and boiler house of the pumping station as it appeared in the early 1960s, which, at the time of this photo, was used as a post office.

The pumping station was equipped with steam-driven pumps, which were imported from England, and able to extract an estimated 400,000 gallons of water from three wells nearby for the early inhabitants in the Kowloon Peninsula. With the supply of fresh water, commercial activities could take place and normal daily living was assured. As a result, the population of Kowloon was increased by 33% from about 23,000 in 1891 to 34,782 by 1897.

This pumping station became unimportant in the 20th century because of the construction of Kowloon Reservoir in 1906 and other reservoirs subsequently. In 1911 the pumping station ceased operation and the chimney was demolished one year later. The remaining buildings then underwent different adaptive reuse. The first building, which had consisted of the engine house and the boiler house, was converted into a post office in the 1910s–1920s. The second building, which had consisted the workshop and the fitters' quarters, became a hazardous goods store. The third building, which had consisted the overseers' quarters and the office, became a hawkers control office.

In the pre-war and early post-war days Yunnan Lane, which was located by the side of the post office, became a place where professional letter writers set up their stalls. There were as many as 37 stalls. This traditional trade gradually disappeared with raising literacy.

The post office ceased operation in 1967 with the opening of the nearby Kowloon Central Post Office. The vacated post office was then used as a "Street Sleepers' Shelter" operated by the Salvation Army, until the end of the 1990s, when the shelter for the homeless moved across the street to the building on 345A Shanghai Street.

At present, only one of the three buildings remains. Except for the engineer's office, the other parts of the pumping station have been demolished.

== Architecture ==
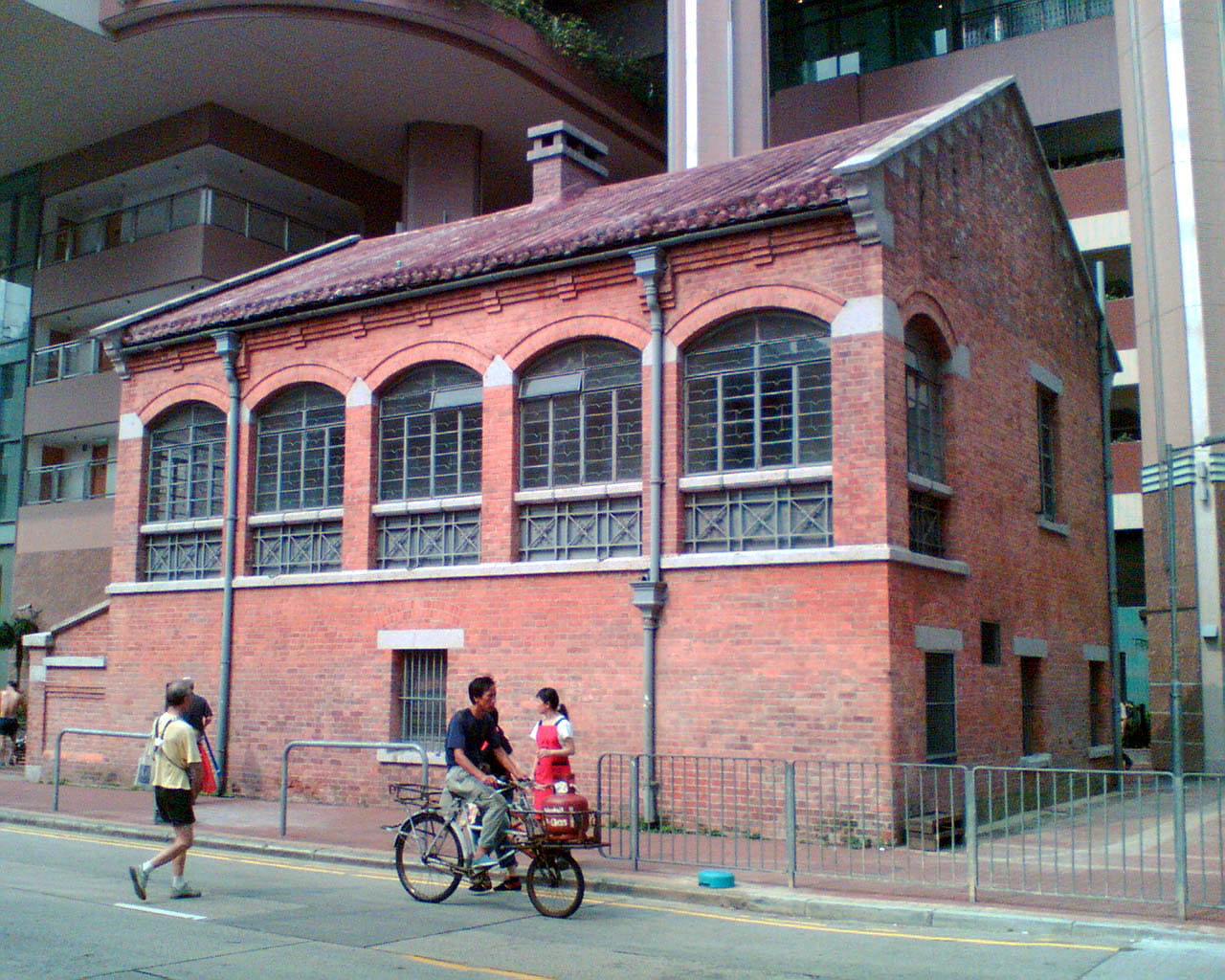
Side view of today's Red Brick House

The building with two-storey is built in a colonial Neo-Classical style with Arts and Crafts influence. The most significant feature of the building is the red brick façade. This refers to the construction of the walls of the building by red bricks, which account for the name "Red Brick House".

Being a former pumping station, the architecture of the building is of utilitarian design, which is also a typical example of the British industrial building. The building does not consist of much decoration, there are only some decorative brickwork features and ironwork balustrading.

There are not much structural alteration to the building. The pitched roof is finished with double layer Chinese clay tiles, with a single chimney stack and flue openings projects above the ridge. The windows of the building consist of wooden casements incorporated in window openings with granite cills and lintels. Above the lintels, there are rough brick relieving arches. Ornamental ironwork balustrades with granite copings is retained from an arched verandah, which is now enclosed with windows. Doors of the building which are cross braced and battened, are also made of wood. Cast-iron rainwater pipes, hopper heads and gutters along the wall of the building also have executional level of significance to the building.

Inside the building, there are arched verandah and internal arcades on the ground floor. The walls are plastered and painted and the floor is screeded. For the first floor, the original wooden doors and windows, cornices, skirtings and floor boarding are still presented.

== Neighbouring Historic buildings ==
Yau Ma Tei is the oldest developed urban area in Kowloon. Some other low-rise historic structures are found nearby, such as Yaumati Theatre and Yau Ma Tei Wholesale Fruit Market. Architecturally they complement each other. The block next to the Engineer's Office features post-war tong-laus along Shanghai Street, which house the Hong Kong International Hobby and Toy Museum at No. 330.

== Preservation ==
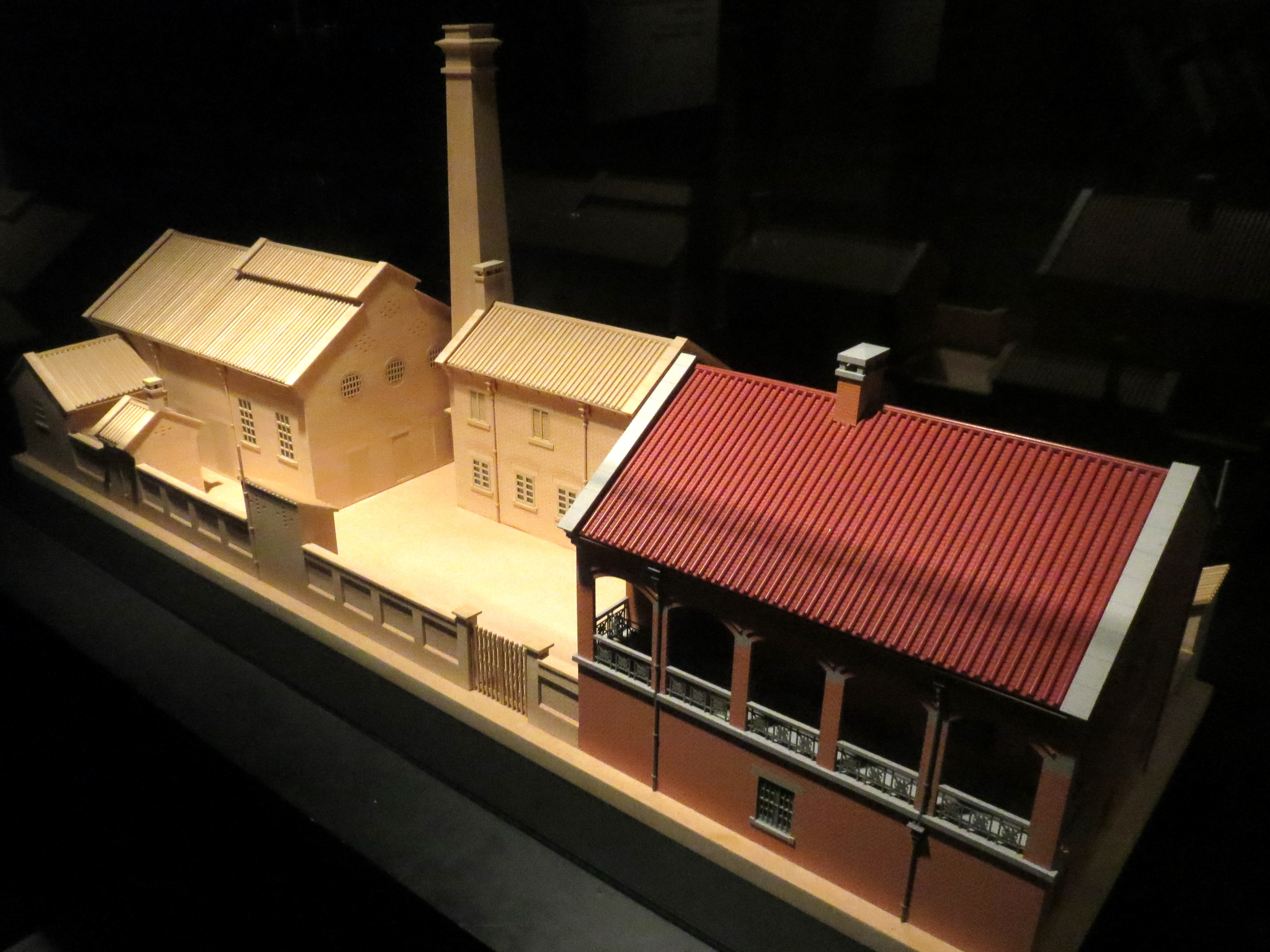
Model of the former pumping station

In early 2000, the sole surviving building of former pumping station was slated for demolition in preparation for the 36-storey, twin-tower residential project, No. 8 Waterloo Road, which was jointly developed by the Land Development Corporation (the predecessor of the Urban Renewal Authority) and Sun Hung Kai Properties.

At that time, the original identity of the building had been forgotten and it was simply referred to as "Red Brick House".

During the process of the study, two heritage specialists from The University of Hong Kong, Dr. Lee Ho Yin and Dr. Lynne DiStefano, raised questions about the original function of the anonymous Red Brick House.

The original identity and usage of the building was revealed when the original architectural drawings were found by an old British engineer at Water Supplies Department. In view of the building's historical significance and rarity, it was awarded a Grade I Historical Building status in 2000 and recommended for conservation. As a result, the building cannot be demolished. Therefore, Land Development Corporation and Sun Hung Kai Properties had to adjust the development plans to accommodate the 36-storey building on the site, without any influence on the engineer's office of the former pumping station.

== Revitalisation ==
The building is now vacant awaiting a suitable adaptive re-use. It is proposed that the Red Brick Building will revitalise in conjunction with the Yau Ma Tei Theatre as a Xiqu (戲曲) Activity Centre, providing a performing and practising venue for small-scale Cantonese Opera performance. It would also serve as training venue for budding artists. This revitalisation project was endorsed by the Public Works Subcommittee of the Finance Committee of the Legislative Council at its meeting on 21 January 2009.

== See also ==
- Water supply in Hong Kong
