= Osbert Chadwick =

British engineer

- Born: 4 April 1844
- Died: 27 September 1913 (aged 69)

Osbert Chadwick (4 April 1844 - 27 September 1913) was a British engineer and a professor at University College London

== Early life and education ==
Osbert Chadwick was born in 1844 to Edwin Chadwick, an English social worker and sanitation reformer. Chadwick studied at the Royal Military Academy in Woolwich, graduating with a commission in 1864.

== Career ==
=== Royal Engineers ===
In 1868 Chadwick went to India in the Royal Engineers public works department. His duties were concentrated in Bombay for the time where he managed barges.

=== Post-Engineers ===
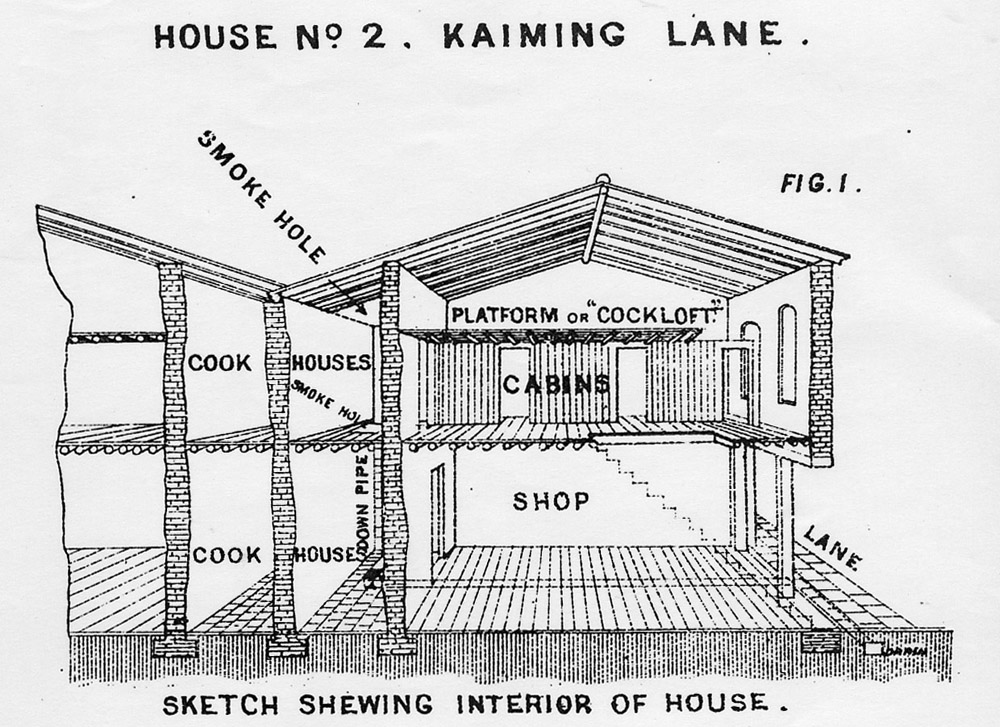
Illustration by Chadwick during his time in Hong Kong

In 1873, Chadwick left the Royal Engineers and became the engineer for the Odessa water works.

During this time Chadwick directed and co-directed several engineering projects across the Asian British colonies such as Grenada, Hong Kong, and Mauritius among others. While in Hong Kong he contributed significantly to the design of the future Engineer's office.

From 1883 to 1889 Chadwick built a water supply system that formed the Chadwick lakes in Malta. This earned him the Companion of the Order of St. Michael and St. George in 1886.

=== Professorship ===
Osbert Chadwick served as the Chadwick professor of municipal engineering at University College London from 1898 to 1911, the position was created and named after his father Edwin Chadwick.

== Death ==
Chadwick died on 27 September 1913 in Knocknalling, Kirkcudbrightshire.
