= Social Welfare Department =

Hong Kong government department

- 社會福利署

Agency overview
- Formed: 1 January 1958
- Preceding agency: Social Welfare Office
- Headquarters: Wu Chung House No. 213 Queen's Road East, Wan Chai
- Employees: 5,459 (2014)
- Annual budget: HK$58,349.2 million (2015-16 estimate)
- Agency executive: Gordon Leung, Director of Social Welfare
- Website: swd.gov.hk

Social Welfare Department
- Traditional Chinese: 社會福利署
- Simplified Chinese: 社会福利署
Transcriptions
Standard Mandarin
- Hanyu Pinyin: Shèhuì Fúlì Shǔ
Yue: Cantonese
- Jyutping: se5 wui6*2 fuk1 lei6 cyu5

The Social Welfare Department (Chinese: 社會福利署) is a department of the Hong Kong Government responsible for providing welfare services to the community.

== Responsibilities ==
The department provides services to families and children, the elderly, recovering criminal offenders, drug abusers, street sleepers, persons with disabilities, the mentally ill, and the community at large. It administers social security schemes, including the Comprehensive Social Security Assistance, which forms a large portion of its annual expenses. The department operates community and social centres, and also once operated libraries.

== History ==
The forerunner of the SWD was the Social Welfare Office, which was set up in light of the influx of population from the mainland China, post-World War II destruction and poverty, and the post-war expansion in the provision of services to meet education, healthcare and social needs.

The Social Welfare Office was renamed Social Welfare Department from 1 January 1958. At the same time, the position of Social Welfare Officer was renamed Director of Social Welfare.

Several prominent current and former officials, including Anson Chan , Carrie Lam and Patrick Nip , had formerly served as Director of Social Welfare.

At various times, the department has been headquartered in Lee Gardens, the World Trade Centre (19th and 20th floors), and Wu Chung House in Wan Chai.

== Size and composition ==
SWD is one of the 12 largest departments under the Civil Service in Hong Kong, with 6266 civil servants working under it in 2021. For the year 2021-2022, it is estimated that the total expenditure of SWD would be $104.3 billion.

SWD is organised into thirteen branches under the Director of Social Welfare. Among them, the Clinical Psychological Service Branch, Elderly Branch, Family and Child Welfare Branch, Planning and Development Branch, Rehabilitation and Medical Social Services Branch and Youth and Corrections Branch are under the Deputy Director of Social Welfare (Services). The other seven branches, namely the Administration Branch, Finance Branch, Human Resource Management Branch, Information Systems and Technology Branch, Licensing and Regulation Branch are under the Deputy Director of Social Welfare (Administration). There is also an Information and Public Relations Unit within SWD.

== Responsibilities ==
SWD provides services to families and children, the elderly, recovering criminal offenders, drug abusers, street sleepers, persons with disabilities, the mentally ill, and the community at large. It administers social security schemes, including the Comprehensive Social Security Assistance, which forms a large portion of its annual expenses. The department operates community and social centres, and also once operated libraries.

SWD provides service mainly in 12 aspects.

(1) Social Security

The SWD aims to provide social security support - including financial and material assistance, to the financially vulnerable. There are mainly four initiatives under this category, namely the Comprehensive Social Security Assistance (CSSA) Scheme , Social Security Allowance (SSA) Scheme, Criminal and Law Enforcement Injuries Compensation (CLEIC) Scheme, Traffic Accident Victims Assistance (TAVA) Scheme and Emergency Relief.

CSSA Scheme

The CSSA Scheme consists of two components: the Employment Support Service and the disregarded earnings - meaning to disregard part of their income when assessing the amount of assistance.

SSA Scheme

The SSA Scheme provides a monthly allowance to Hong Kong residents who face special needs arising from disability or old age, covering residents who are severely disabled or are 65 years old or above. The Scheme includes Disability Allowance such as Normal Disability Allowance and Higher Disability Allowance (recipient not receiving care in residential institutions subsidised by the government), and Old Age Allowances including Old Age Allowance (age 70 or above), Normal Old Age Living Allowance and Higher Old Age Living Allowance (age 65 or above and has monthly income and assets not exceeding prescribed limits ). The aforementioned Allowances do not require applicants to go through a means test, yet the applicants must continue to reside in Hong Kong during receipt of payment. As at 31 March 2021, there were 896,802 cases of Old Age Allowances (including Old Age Allowance and Old Age Living Allowance), and 158,962 cases of Disability Allowances (including Normal Disability Allowance and Higher Disability Allowance) .

The SSA scheme also covers the Guangdong Scheme and Fujian Scheme which provides monthly allowance to Hong Kong residents who choose to reside in Guangdong or Fujian. In 2020-2021, the government had spent $38,166Mn on the SSA Scheme.

CLEIC Scheme

The CLEIC scheme provides financial awards to persons (or to their dependents in cases of death) who are injured as a result of a crime of violence, or by a law enforcement officer using a weapon in the execution of his duty. It is non-contributory and non-means-tested. Applicants are required to attend an interview at the CLEIC Section to provide relevant information and documentary proof.

In 2020-21, a total of $ 8.39 million was paid out under the CLEIC Scheme to 303 cases, showing an upward trend throughout the years 2016 to 2021.

TAVA Scheme

The TAVA Scheme provides speedy financial assistance to road traffic accident victims (or to their dependents in cases of death). It is non-means tested, and does not consider the element of fault leading to the occurrence of the accident. Payments are made for personal injuries, yet loss of or damage to property is not covered. Applicants are required to attend an interview at the TAVA Section to provide relevant information and documentary proof. In 2020-21, a total of $409.09Mn was paid out under the TAVA Scheme to 14,826 cases, showing an upward trend throughout the years 2016 to 2021.

Emergency Relief

Emergency Relief (ER) can be divided into two components: ER Services and ER Fund. ER Services provide good, or cash-in-lieu of food and relief articles to victims of natural or other disasters such as fire, typhoon, flood, rainstorm, landslide and house collapse, and also for evacuees of buildings and premises considered to be dangerous under Closure Orders. ER Fund provides prompt assistance to persons in need of urgent relief as a result of natural disasters, and grants from the fund are intended for relief instead of compensation. The SWD is only responsible for grants regarding personal injury or death, and other departments are responsible for other categories of grants. The fund is vested in the director of Social Welfare Incorporated as trustee. The committee is chaired by the Director of social welfare and some members are non-officials.

(2) Family and Child Welfare

The family and child welfare provided by the SWD can be divided into several components, namely Family Services, Child Welfare Services, and Family and Child Protective Services.

Family Services

For Family Services, SWD has commissioned NGOs to operate short-term good assistance to help individuals and families with difficulty in dealing with their daily food expenditure since 2009 . In the year 2020-2021, there were 20,243 cases provided with food assistance. To help individuals and families temporarily affected by the pandemic (i.e., COVID-19), SWD has relaxed the asset limits of the service from 1 June 2021 to 31 May 2022 on a time-limited basis by pitching the asset limits to those of Working Family Allowance. As at 31 March 2021, 425,857 beneficiaries in total had received food assistance from the service projects.

Besides, operated by Caritas Hong Kong, a Family Crisis Support Centre (FCSC) is established to tackle family crises at an early stage by providing a package of services including a 24-hour hotline, emergency intervention with short-term accommodation and other support services. As at 31 March 2021, 88.5% of the service users indicated a positive response in overcoming their immediate family crises upon leaving the support centre. The SWD hotline has been operating on a 24-hour basis since October 2018, and in 2020-2021, the social workers of SWD (to listen to phone calls during normal office hours) had handled 49,123 calls with 6,758 of them requiring counselling service, while the social workers of HOST (to listen to phone calls outside normal office hours) had handled 13,276 calls with 11,650 of them requiring counselling service.

Support for Ethnic Minorities

In supporting ethnic minorities, the SWD has commissioned three NGOs to set up three outreaching teams to proactively reach out to ethnic minorities and connect those in need with mainstream welfare services, The Neighbourhood Advice-Action Council is one of the NGOs with outreaching teams. The SWD also launched a 3-year Ethnic Minority District Ambassador Pilot Scheme in October 2020 to enhance services provided by district service units in 9 districts with higher ethnic minorities population. There are currently 46 Ethnic Minority District Ambassadors in Hong Kong. In the year 2020-2021, 2,645 new service users were contacted through outreaching successfully.

Support for Street Sleepers

The SWD had organised three integrated services teams for street sleepers, and 1,580 street sleepers were approached in the year 2020-2021. However, there are critiques regarding the quality of such service, see below.

Child Welfare Services

Regarding children welfare, the SWD provides both Adoption Service and Residential Child Care Services. The former finds suitable and permanent homes for children who have lost their parents through death or desertion and those who were born out of wedlock and whose parents are difficult to find. As at the end of December 2021, 142 children were adopted by local homes, 25 were adopted by overseas families, and 24 were adopted by relatives through private arrangements. However, there are still 97 children awaiting adoption.

The Residential Child Care Services are provided for children and young persons under 21 who cannot be adequately cared for by their families. These services cover both non-institutional care such as Foster Care and Small Group Homes, and institutional care including Residential Child Care Centres and Boys'/ Girls' Home. In the year 2020-2021, there were 924 places for Small Group Homes and the average enrolment rate was 94%.

Family and Child Protective Services

The SWD had launched a Publicity Campaign on Strengthening Families and Combating Violence in the year 2020-2021, and 1,266 district-based public education programmes and activities with a total attendance of 24,086 had been organised by the District Social Welfare Offices.

There are also 11 units of Family and Child Protective Services Units located in different districts, and 7,002 cases were served in the year 2020-2021.

(3) Clinical Psychological Services

The clinical psychological service provided by the SWD can be divided into several parts, including casework service, central psychological support service and crisis intervention. Apart from creating psychotherapy booklets and audios for people in need, the team would follow up on cases that require treatments and attention by professional clinical psychologists. Psychologists would also visit kindergarten as a form of central psychological support to pre-school children with special education needs, and day-training and vocational rehabilitation centres to provide central support to those who are intellectually or physically disabled. SWD also provides emergency psychological support to those who suffer from unexpected catastrophes, such as providing consultation to those victims of the fire accident in Yau Ma Tei in 2020. In addition, the psychologists of SWD would promote psychological wellbeing to the public and offer training to other professionals such as teachers and social workers from time to time. During the COVID pandemic, SWD conducts casework and central psychological support online, and published materials to give suggestions in coping with the pandemic, including meditation and breathing exercises.

The clinical psychological service of SWD is headed by a chief clinical psychologist, who is graded D1 in the SAR government structure. There are six different teams in charge of cases across different areas and locations in Hong Kong. Each team is headed by a senior clinical psychologist.

(4) Medical Social Services

In order to assist patients who suffer from trauma or illness to re-integrate into the society, SWD sends medical social workers to stations at public hospitals, child assessment centres, psychiatric hospitals etc to provide tangible and psychological support to those in need. For example, medical social workers may decide to provide counselling service to patients and their families on a case-by-case basis, or may provide financial support to them by waiving their medical charges in public hospitals and referring them to receive social security benefits. In recent years, SWD introduced a Community Care Fund Medical Assistance Programme, in which patients with financial need would be sponsored for expensive self-financed drug items that doctors deem necessary. In 2020-21, medical social workers handled a total of 198,400 cases.

There are currently 491 medical social workers in SWD and the medical social workers can be classified into two types, namely those who work in general settings and those who work in psychiatric settings. The SWD seeks to develop the goal of 'one medical social worker for each patient' so that the medical social worker who has better understanding of the patient can conduct follow-up assessment without internal referral.

(5) Rehabilitation Services

SWD aims to provide an array of social rehabilitation services for persons with disabilities, including subvented pre-school rehabilitation services, day training services, residential care services, vocational rehabilitation services and community support services etc. Under the Central Referral System for Rehabilitation Services (CRSRehab), all target groups including physically and/or mentally handicapped persons, ex-mentally ill persons, persons with visual and/or hearing impairment etc. must be referred by social workers from medical social services units, integrated family services centres, special schools or rehabilitation service units in order to apply for day or residential services.

With the regularisation of the Bought Place Scheme (BPS) since 2014, SWD has provided more residential rehabilitation service options by purchasing 1018 places from private residential care homes for persons with disabilities (PRHDs). Four outreaching teams were further set up in 2018-19 to provide professional consultation, training and support service to residents living in private RCHDs and their family members. In addition, SWD has regularised some pilot initiatives for specific groups, such as Special Subsidy Scheme for Persons with Permanent Stoma and Training Subsidy for Children who are on the Waiting List of Subvented Pre-school Rehabilitation Services assistance programme (TSP).

In 2020-21, a total of 1230 additional places for rehabilitation services were offered, 267 of which belong to pre-school rehabilitation services, while 397 and 566 of which are for day rehabilitation services and residential rehabilitation services respectively.

(6) Services for the Elderly

The services provided by SWD to elders can be divided into (1) community support services, (2) community care services and (3) residential care services.

Community support services

SWD operates District Elderly Community Centres, Neighbourhood Elderly Centres and a Social Centre for the Elderly. These centres provide services and assistance to and organise activities for elderly persons to keep them involved in the community. Besides, they also provide support to the family caretakers of the elders. Support and services are also provided for elderly with dementia and for handling elder abuse cases.

Community care services

SWD operates Day Care Centres/Units for the Elderly, Integrated Home Care Services and Enhanced Home and Community Care Services. These centres target elderly persons aged 60 or above and have been assessed and recommended for Community Care Services or Residential Care Services under the Standardised Care Need Assessment Mechanism for Elderly Services.

Residential care services

SWD provides residential care for elderly persons who cannot receive adequate care at home through Subvented Residential Care Homes for the Elderly, Subvented Nursing Homes, Contract Homes (selected through competitive bidding), Self-financing Homes Participating in Nursing Home Place Purchase Scheme and private homes for the elderly participating in Enhanced Bought Place Scheme.

Apart from these residential care homes, Residential Respite Service for the Elderly provides short-term residential care for elders who are ordinarily taken care of by their family members, so that the family members may take a break from the long-term caretaking. Referrals for this type of service are made by social workers.

Other Services

Recognising that some families hire foreign domestic helpers to take care of elders residing at home, the Pilot Scheme on Training for Foreign Domestic Helpers in Elderly Care was launched to provide hired foreign domestic domestic workers with basic training and education on how to take care of frail elders.

(7) Services for Young People

SWD provides support for young people through a wide range of programmes and activities, including centre services, After School Care Programme (ASCP), School Social Work Service, services for young people at risk and services for drug abusers.

Centre services Programmes under Children and Youth Services Centres services (CYCs) are offered on a neighbourhood basis and divided into core and non-core categories. While the former includes guidance and counselling service, supportive service for young people in disadvantaged circumstances, socialisation programmes and development of social responsibility and competence, the latter covers drop-in service, interest groups, summer youth programmes and study or reading room service. In addition, Integrated Children and Youth Services Centres (ICYSCs) provide professional preventive, developmental, supportive and remedial services for children and youth in specific catchment areas through guidance and counselling, supportive programmes, developmental and socialisation programmes, and community engagement programmes.

After School Care Programme (ASCP)

By implementing the After School Care Programme (ASCP) on a self-financing and fee-charging basis and Enhanced ASCP with fee-waiving places, SWD offers after-school homework guidance, parental guidance and education, skill learning as well as social activities to children whose parents are unable to look after their children because of work, job search or other reasons. In 2020-21, SWD funded low-income families to attend ASCP by providing more full fee-waiving places, lowering eligibility threshold, streamlining means-test procedures, increasing fee-waiving subsidy and providing extra subsidy to children with special educational needs, etc.

School Social Work Service

School social workers of NGOs provide in-school stationing service. As at 1 September 2021, 34 NGOs participated in the provision of stationing service for 463 secondary day schools.

Services for young people at risk

To assist young people who are vulnerable to risks, SWD provides outreaching service operated by NGO, with 19 teams of District Youth Outreaching Social Work Teams (YOTs) and 18 teams of Overnight Outreaching Service for Young Night Drifters as at 31 March 2021. For hidden youth who may not prefer conventional mainstream services, 5 Cyber Youth Support Teams and Hotline Service for Youth-at-risk 2777 8899 were set up to provide online and offline counselling service. Currently, five Community Support Service Scheme (CSSS) teams are attached to five ICYSCs to equip arrested youth and those cautioned under the Police Superintendent's Discretion Scheme with a wide range of counselling and training services, as well as crime prevention programmes.

Services for drug abusers

Led by Narcotics Division of the Security Bureau , SWD provides residential drug treatment through drug treatment and rehabilitation centres and halfway houses, as well as provides community-based rehabilitation services for drug abusers and ex-drug abusers through Counselling Centre for Psychotropic Substance Abusers (CCPSA) and Centre for Drug Counselling (CDC).

(8) Services for Offenders

SWD incorporates community-based rehabilitation service and residential care service into rehabilitation programmes for offenders.

Community-based Rehabilitation Services

Probation Service (PO) is implemented to provide offenders under Probation Order with statutory supervision, personal guidance and family counselling through regular interviews, home visits, group work and other activities during their 1-3 year probation period. Similarly, the Community Service Orders (CSO) Scheme is introduced to arrange unpaid work placement, statutory supervision and personal guidance for the offenders placed under Community Service Orders. Under the subvention of SWD, the Youth Outreach provides hostel facilities and supportive training programmes to young probationers and high-risk youth who are referred by Probation Officers. SWD also subvents The Society of Rehabilitation and Crime Prevention, Hong Kong (SRACP) as a major provider of support services for ex-offenders and discharged prisoners, ranging from hostel, employment development, pre-release preparation, court social work, community education and crime prevention services, to short-term rental assistance.

Correctional / Residential Homes

Tuen Mun Children and Juvenile Home (TMCJH) serves as a multi-purpose site of refuge place, remand home, probation home and reformatory school, in order to provide short-term custody and residential training for children, juveniles and young offenders. SWD arranges a variety of activities for residents in TMCJH, including education and vocational training, individual counselling and group work services, community connection, recreational activities, etc. In 2020-21, there are a total of 1044 admissions and 24 discharged cases upon successful completion of residential training.

Joint Venture with Correctional Services Department

SWD jointly established the Young Offender Assessment Panel (YOAP) with the Correctional Services Department (CSD) . YOAP coordinates interviews with individual young offenders, facilitates medical, mental and/or psychological assessment, and provides professional recommendation on the most appropriate rehabilitation programme in the sentencing, with reference to SWD and CSD suitability reports and relevant materials. Another joint venture between SWD and CSD is The Post-Release Supervision of Prisoners Scheme (PRSS), which provides guidance and counselling to adult discharged prisoners put under Supervision Orders.

(9) Community Development

(a) Community Centre

Originally established and run by non-governmental organisations, community centres are now fully subsidised by the Government. A typical community centre is departmentalised into fractions including social welfare, group working department, community work and study room. As of 2022, there are 13 community centres in Hong Kong.

(b) Neighbourhood Level Community Development Project (NLDCP)

NLDCP was introduced in the 1970s to serve transit communities where the provision of social welfare policies were inadequate or non-existent, including temporary housing areas, squatter, cottage etc. The number of NLDCP teams has decreased from 52 to 17 in 1995 and the Social Welfare Department has distributed the thus saved resources to other community projects.

(c) Care and Support Networking Team (CSNT)

Operated by Society for Community Organization, CSNT assists street-sleepers, ex-offenders and ex-mentally ill persons in reintegration into society since 2003.

(10) Licensing and Regulation

The Social Welfare Department is responsible for licensing and regulation of residential care homes for eldlery and persons with disabilities, drug dependent persons treatment, rehabilitation centres and child care centres.

(11) Control of Charitable Fund-raising Activities

The Social Welfare Department is empowered under section 4(17)(i) of the Summary Offences Ordinance (Cap. 228) to regulate fund-raising activities for charitable purposes. Any person intends to conduct, provide equipment for, or participate in any fund-raising activities for charitable purposes must apply for a public subscription permit, which permits activities including flag days and general charitable fund-raising activities. Currently, a Chief Executive Officer of the Lotteries Fund Projects Section under the Subventions Branch of the Social Welfare Department is responsible for issuing the permits.

(a) Flag Days

Invitation for application is conducted annually in April or May each year via the Social Welfare Department or newspaper advertisement. In case the number of applications exceeds the number of flag days available, a drawing of lots will be held to decide on successful organisations. Issuance of permits generally takes place in December. The number of permits issued for flag days averaged 118 each year between 2012-2013 to 2015-16.

(b) General Charitable Fund-raising Activities

Examples include charity sale of badges, tokens or similar articles, door to door donation, setting up of donation boxes etc. Applications can be submitted throughout the year. The number of permits issued for flag days averaged 397 each year between 2012-2013 to 2015-16.

In allowing the application, the Department will strike a balance between the smooth execution of the activities and ensuring that only an acceptable and reasonable inconvenience is caused to the public .

(12) Support Services

Through developing partnerships and providing funds, SWD supports the provisions of social services by the welfare sectors. Donations from the business sectors are allocated to the provisions of services through various programmes.

The Partnership Funds for the Disadvantaged is a tripartite partnership programme whereby the government matches the donations by the business sector to suitable charitable welfare NGOs who applied for funds. The Partnership Fund for the Disadvantaged - Dedicated Portion for After-school Learning and Support programme facilitates the provision of more after-school learning and support programmes for students from grassroot families by non-governmental welfare organisations and primary and secondary schools, using funds donated by businesses.

== Controversy and criticism ==
Control of Charitable Fund-raising Activities

The Audit Commission highlighted the issues of transparency and accountability of the fund-raising activities control system, and recommended that the Director of Social Welfare shall review the effectiveness of the Reference Guide, and to update the Reference Guide and Guidance Note. Further, the Audit Commission concerned the high administration costs of fund-raising activities and the difficulties of the members of the public to obtain information of audited reports of fundraising activities submitted by relevant non-governmental organisations. The Director of Social Welfare agreed with the audit recommendations.

Insufficient Supervision of Subvented Services

The SWD has frequently been criticised for its Lump Sum Grant Subvention System ("LSGSS"), through which it provides funding to NGOs. The LSGSS gives the NGOs flexibility to make use of the funds within the context of the Funding and Service Agreement ("FSA"). The Audit Commission has conducted an overall review of the system and identified concerns in 5 main areas.

Financial Monitoring

NGOs are allowed to retain lump sum grant ("LSG") reserves. The Audit considers that the SWD has not taken sufficient measures to facilitate the good practice in the use of reserves for improving service delivery and managing and supporting staff.

In light of the concerns about proper use of public resources and the smooth provision of services, the current measures are considered insufficient in (1) keeping the NGOs with persistent LSG operating deficits under check, (2) requiring the disclosure of remuneration to NGOs' senior staff, and (3) ensuring that the LSG subventions are not used to subsidise non-FSA activities.

The Audit also reviewed the accounting inspection that the SWD employs to review NGOs' compliance with accounting and financial reporting requirements provided in the LSG Manual and NGOs' internal control procedures. It is discovered that some accounting inspections have not been performed as scheduled, and that the Director of Social Welfare could have taken further steps to address the irregularities and lack of improvement on the part of the NGOs.

Self-assessment of service quality by NGO

The Audit Commission revealed that the SWD failed to adequately monitor the self-assessment of service quality by NGOs, resulting in overstatement or understatement of performance reported.

In measuring service effectiveness, the SWD mainly conducted it via telephone instead of on site. Further, The Audit Commission found Service Quality Standards ("SQSs"), a set of indicators of what Agreement Service Units ("ASUs") shall do to deliver quality service, were not adequately implemented. The Audit Commission has urged the SWD to formulate more guidelines and manuals on these matters.

Poor Monitoring of service delivery by Social Welfare Department SWD is responsible to monitor the service delivery quality of ASUs and could withdraw their subventions for continuous underperformance. However, although ASUs have to submit an action plan for improvements upon failure to meet performance standards, their underperformance persisted. For instance, the actual service hours of home care service for persons with severe disabilities (HCS) were only slightly more than one fifth of the agreed level of performance. In cases of underperformance, the Audit Commission has urged SWD to critically review whether the subventions are fully justified and timely actions should be taken to tackle the problem of underperformance.

In catering to this problem, SWD has set up the Service Performance Monitoring Committee to monitor services with persistent underperformance and deliberate appropriate follow-up measures.

Governance and management matters

SWD had not ensured that NGOs disclose their annual financial reports for public scrutiny in accordance with the LSG Manual. Some NGOs did not disclose the organisation and structure of their management boards and senior management team, and only about half of the NGOs receiving LSG had disclosed their payment policy according to guidelines. In view of this, the Audit Commission suggested SWD to ensure a timely and effective disclosure of management information by NGOs so as to promote transparency and accountability of NGOs which receive LSG from SWD.

Review of lump sum grant subvention system

Implementing the recommendations by the LSG Independent Review Committee in 2008, the SWD has set up the Social Welfare Development Fund and encouraged NGOs to voluntarily apply for funding actuarial studies to enhance their salary structure and financial projection. The SWD has also established the LSG Independent Complaints Handling Committee in 2009 to manage LSG-related complaints from stakeholders and the public.

However, the SWD was ineffective in ensuring the proper use of the Fund and the usefulness of the actuarial studies, without requiring feedback from all NGOs. The Committee also failed to determine the members' declaration of their potential conflicts of interest. The Audit Commission noted the time lapse since the 2008 review and urged for a further review to optimise the LSGSS.

In response to the above criticisms, the Director of Social Welfare in principle agreed with all the audit recommendations. Therefore, the SWD was tasked to set up a Task Force to conduct review on the enhancement of LSGSS in July 2021 .
