= Ernest R. Matthews =

British civil engineer

Professor Ernest Romney Matthews FRSE FGS MICE (1873–1930) was a British civil engineer and expert on coastal erosion. In authorship he is known as Ernest R. Matthews.

== Life ==
He was born in Hastings in Sussex on the southern English coast on 16 January 1873. He was the son of William Henry Matthews, the local chief coastguard and had a lifelong interest in the coast. He attended St Michael's School in Hastings.

He became Chadwick Professor of Municipal Engineering at University College, London and was also the Chief Drainage Officer for London.

In 1901 he was elected a Fellow of the Royal Society of Edinburgh. His proposers were James Geikie, John Horne, Ben Peach and Cargill Gilston Knott.

In the First World War he had the unusual job of being in charge of trench sanitation, and oversaw the construction of latrines and drainage in France and Flanders. He was mentioned in dispatches.

He died on 6 November 1930.

== Family ==
He was married to Bessie Barker.

== Publications ==
- Coastal Erosion and Protection (1913)
- Planning from an Engineering Aspect (1912)
