= Wu Chung House =

- 胡忠大廈
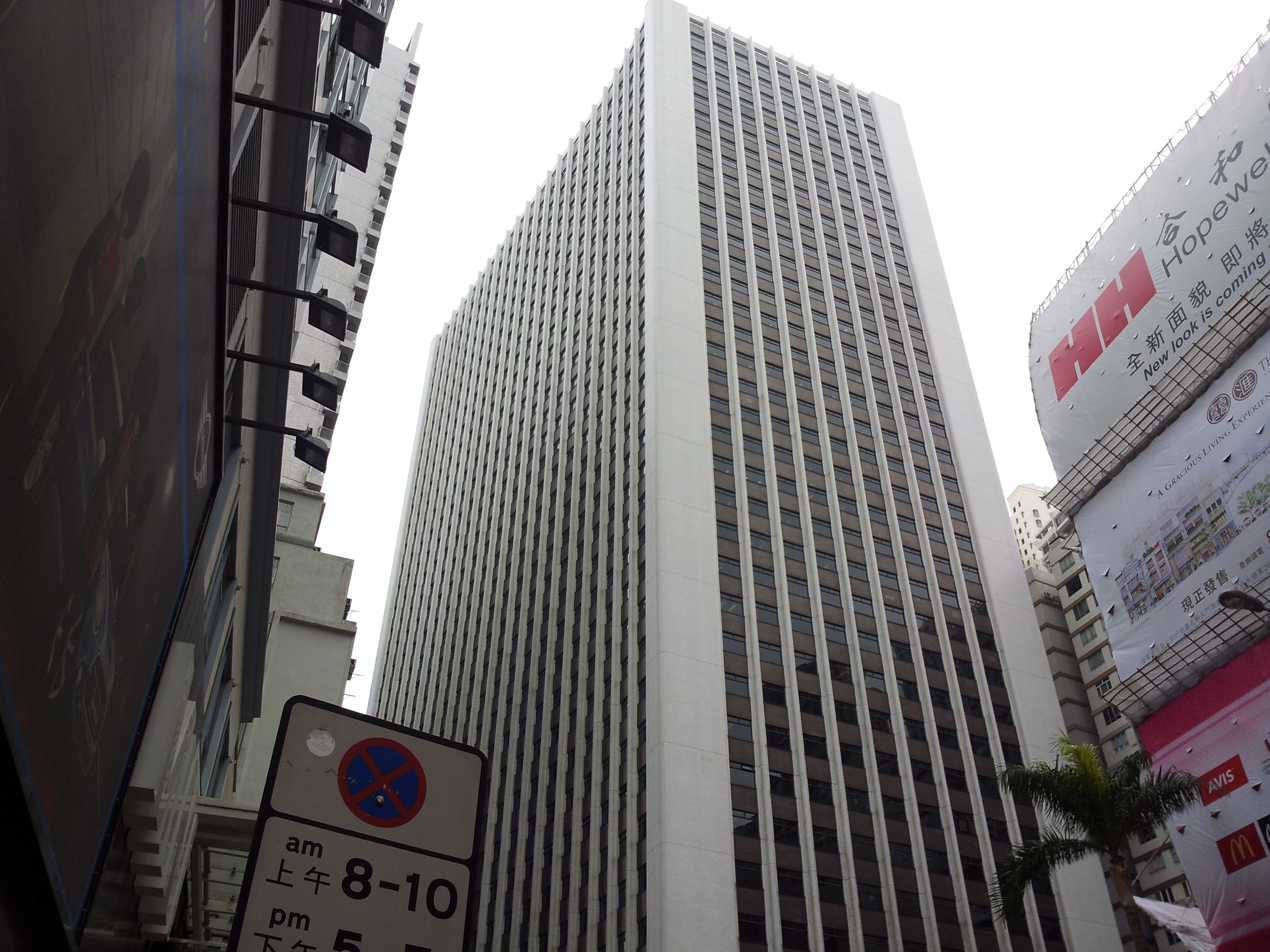
- Interactive map of the Wu Chung House area

General information
- Status: Completed
- Type: Commercial offices
- Location: 213 Queen's Road East, Wan Chai, Hong Kong
- Coordinates: 22°16′27.85″N 114°10′21.66″E
- Completed: 1992; 34 years ago

Height
- Roof: 162.49 m (533.1 ft)

Technical details
- Floor count: 40

Design and construction
- Architect: WMKY Ltd

Wu Chung House
- Traditional Chinese: 胡忠大廈
- Simplified Chinese: 胡忠大厦
Transcriptions
Standard Mandarin
- Hanyu Pinyin: Hú Zhōng Dàshà
Yue: Cantonese
- Jyutping: wu4 zung1 daai6 haa6

The Wu Chung House (Chinese: 胡忠大廈) is a 40-floor skyscraper located on 213 Queen's Road East, in the Wan Chai area of Hong Kong. It was completed in 1992.

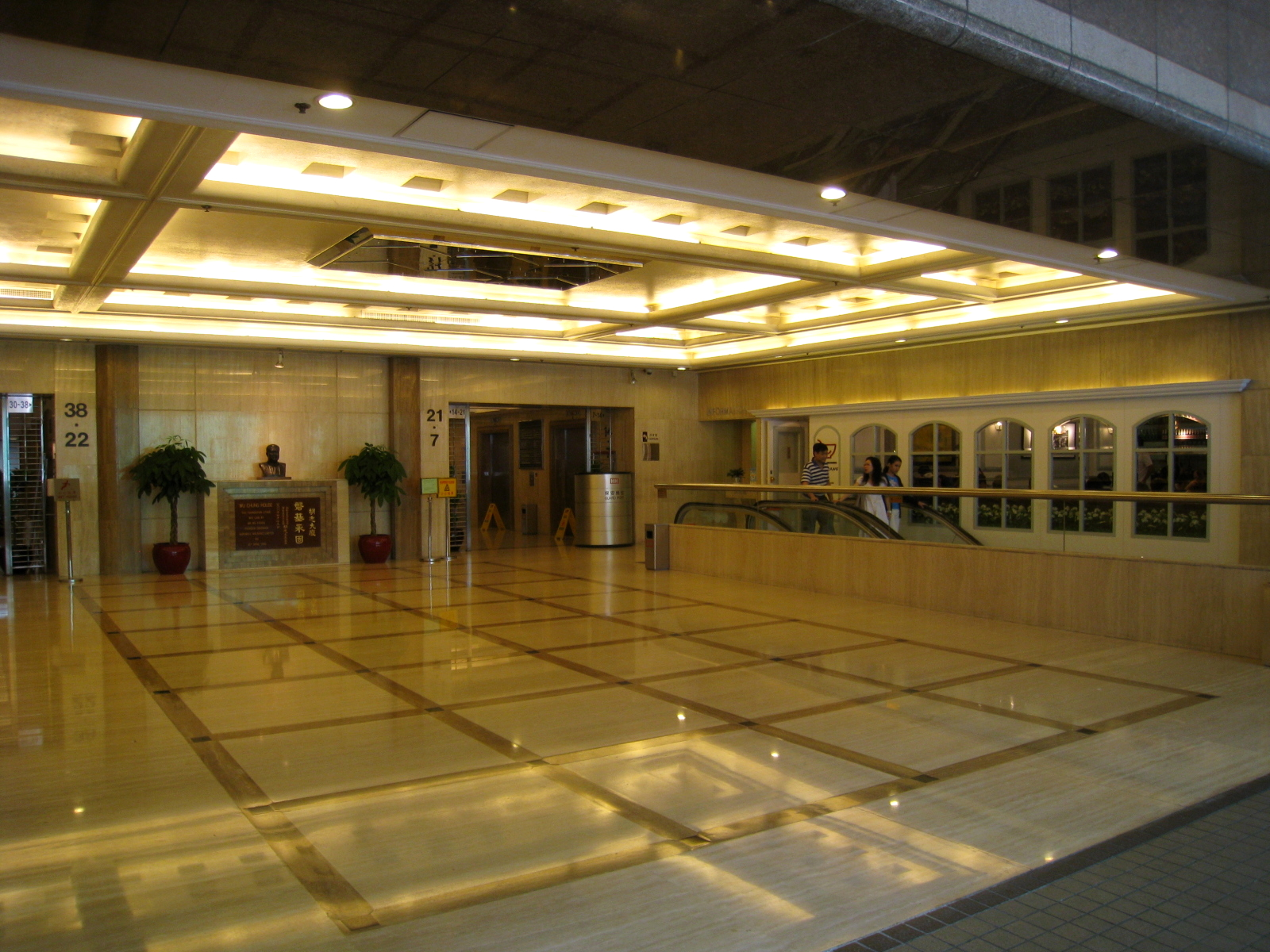
Lobby

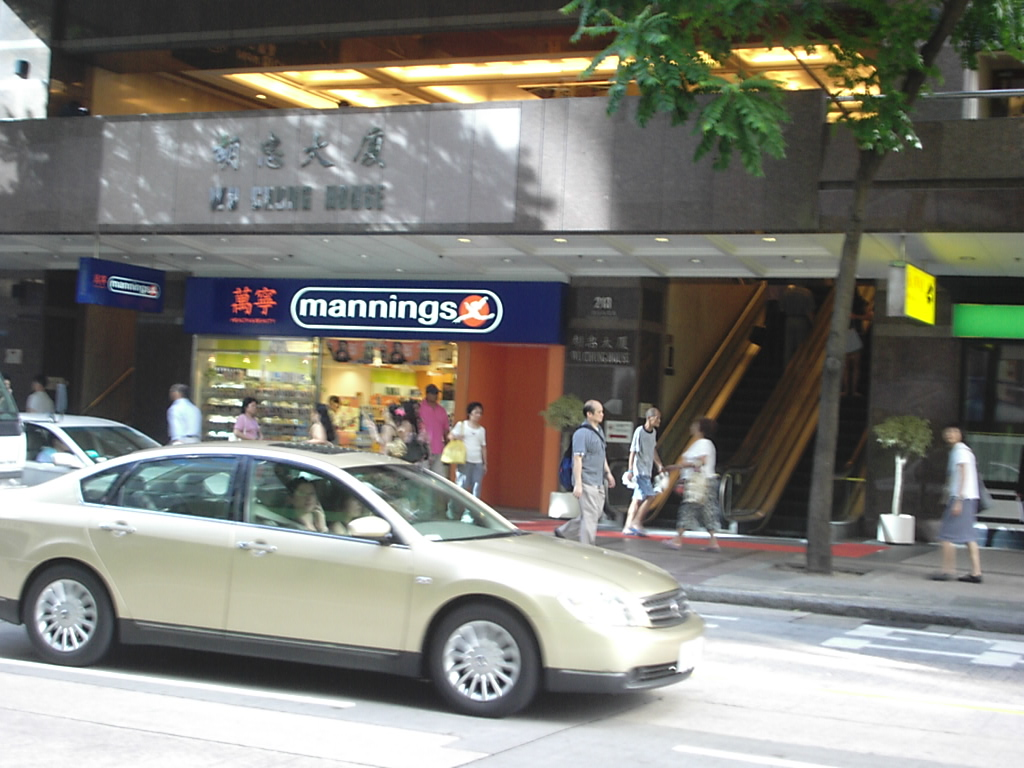
Entrance

== Tenants ==
The building houses a number of important Hong Kong institutions, notably the offices of The Hong Kong Competition Commission, Hong Kong Department of Health, Hopewell Holdings, the Education Bureau and the Hongkong Post. It is named after Wu Chung, the father of current Hopewell Holdings chairman Gordon Wu.

The lobby is located on the first floor and is accessed via an escalator from the outside.
