= Kowloon Central Post Office =

Post office in Hong Kong

Coordinates: 22.309456°N 114.17094°E

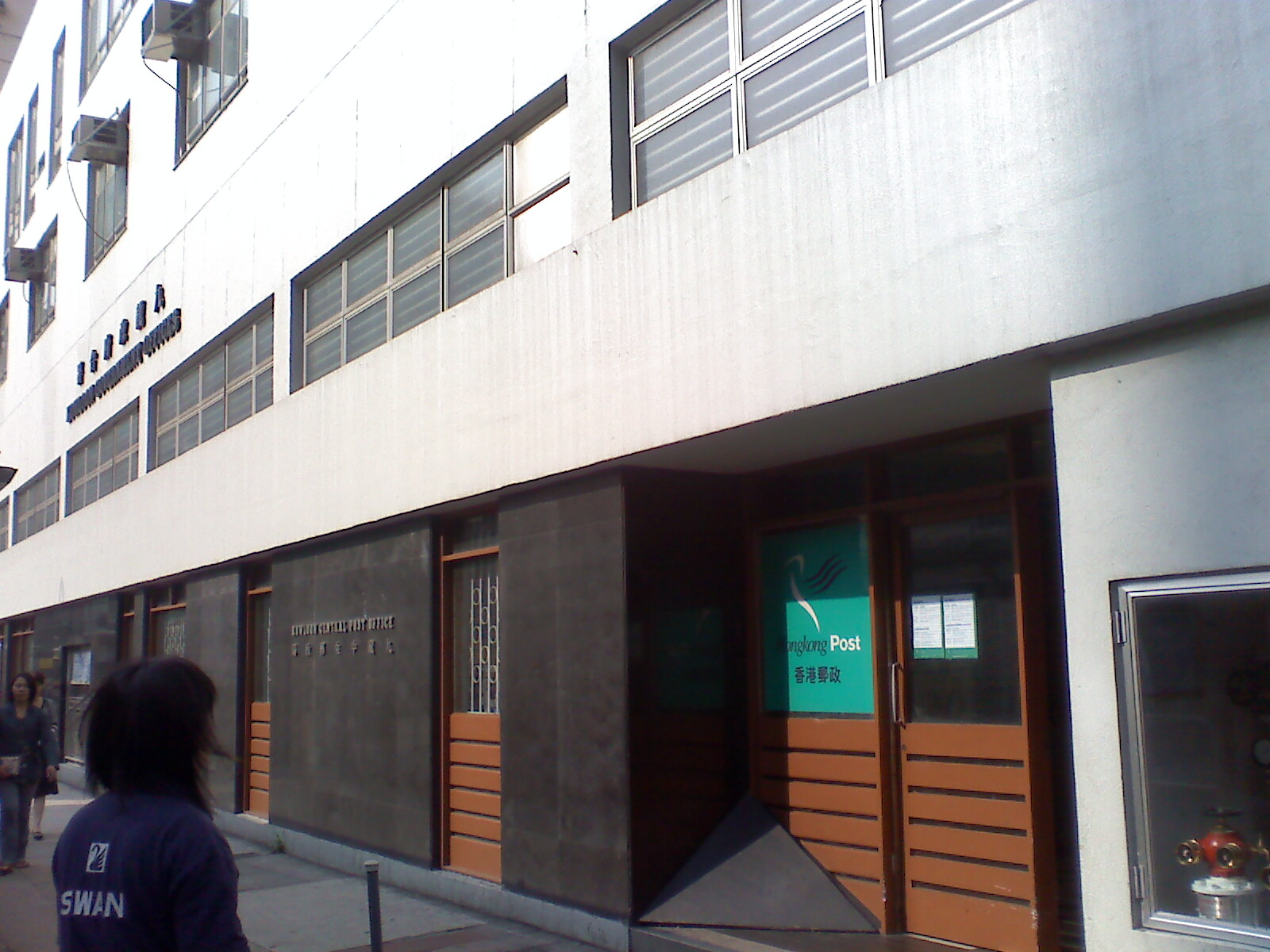
- Kowloon Central Post Office, northern entrance in March 2008
- Traditional Chinese: 九龍中央郵政局
- Simplified Chinese: 九龙中央邮政局
Transcriptions
Standard Mandarin
- Hanyu Pinyin: Jiǔlóng Zhōngyāng Yóuzhèngjú
Yue: Cantonese
- Jyutping: gau2 lung4 zung1 joeng1 jau4 zing3 guk6*2

Kowloon Central Post Office (Chinese: 九龍中央郵政局) is the main post office in Kowloon, Hong Kong. It is located at 405 Nathan Road, Yau Ma Tei, underneath the Kowloon Government Offices.

== See also ==
- Hongkong Post
- Engineer's Office of the Former Pumping Station
