= Union Square (Hong Kong) =

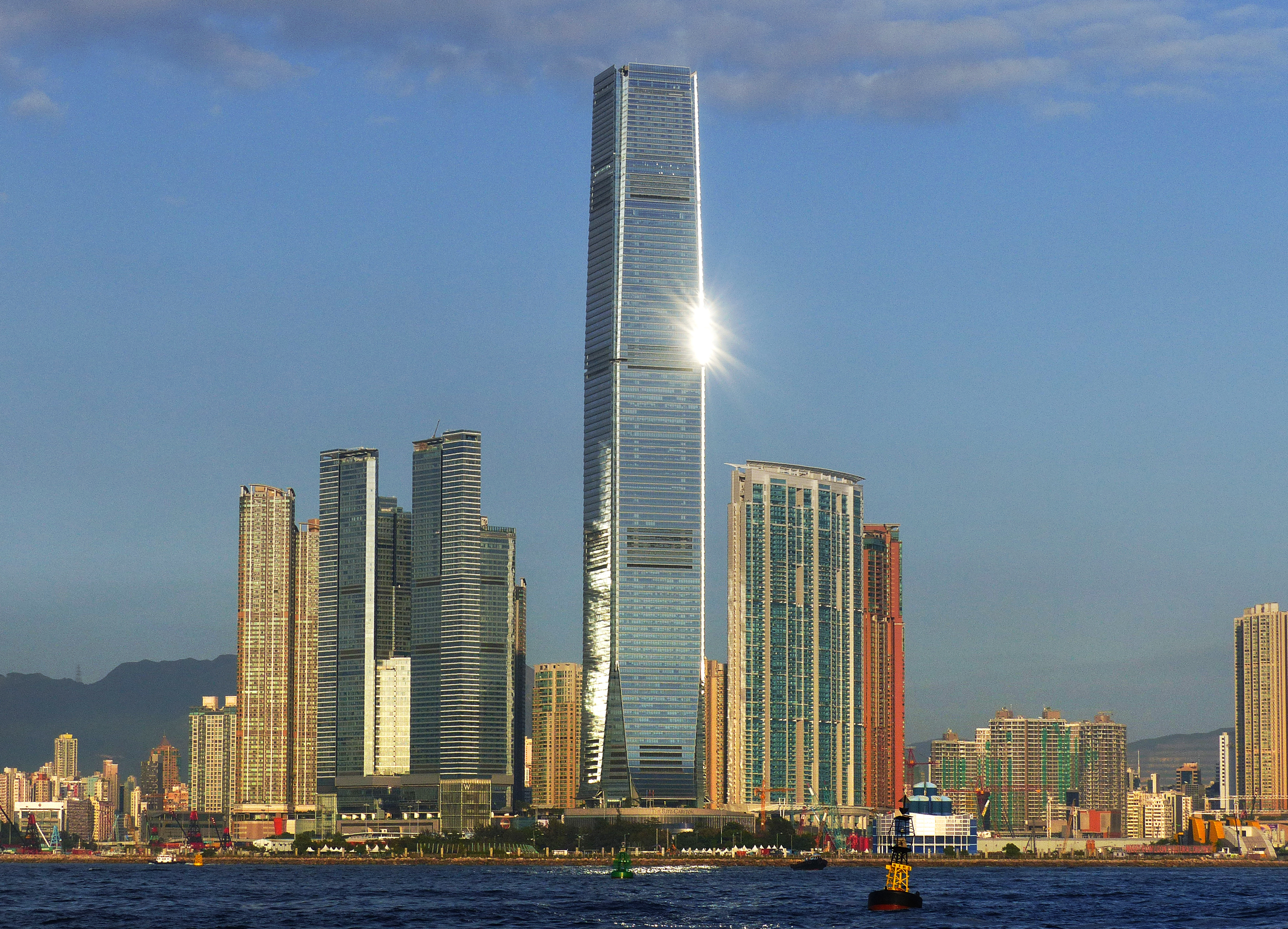
- A view of the complex in 2014

Project
- Completed: 2010; 16 years ago
- Opening date: 2000
- Developer: MTR Properties & Sun Hung Kai Properties (selected properties)
- Architect: Wong & Ouyang
- Operator: Sun Hung Kai Properties (selected properties)
- Owner: MTR Properties

Physical features
- Transport: Kowloon station Austin station High Speed Rail West Kowloon; Kowloon Motor Bus

Location
- Location in Hong Kong
- Coordinates: 22°18′19″N 114°9′42″E
- Country: Hong Kong
- Location: West Kowloon, Tsim Sha Tsui, Kowloon, Hong Kong

Area
  - Total: 13.54 ha (33.5 acres)

A simplified map of Union Square development

The Union Square is a mixed-use commercial and residential real estate project in Hong Kong, located on the West Kowloon reclamation in Tsim Sha Tsui, Kowloon. The area covers 13.54 hectares (33.5 acres), while the site has a gross floor area of 1,090,026 square metres (11,732,940 sq ft), approximately the size of the Canary Wharf development in London. The complex contains some of the tallest buildings in Hong Kong, which includes both the tallest commercial one, the 118-storey International Commerce Centre and residential one, The Cullinan, which rises 270 metres (890 ft) high.

== Location and accommodation ==
Union Square is located at 1 Austin Road West, West Kowloon, Kowloon, Hong Kong. It occupies part of the 340 hectares of land reclaimed from Victoria Harbour in the 1990s to construct a highway and rail link to the new Hong Kong International Airport, and integrates the Kowloon station of the Hong Kong Mass Transit Railway, which serves the Tung Chung and Airport Express lines. The complex is also located near the Guangshengang XRL West Kowloon and the Austin station of the Tuen Ma line. The built area includes 5,866 residential units (totalling 608,026 m^{2} (6,544,740 sq ft)), 2,230 hotel rooms, and 2,490 serviced apartments with 167,472 m^{2} (1,802,650 sq ft) of combined hotel and serviced apartment space and 231,778 m^{2} (2,494,840 sq ft) of office space. The development also includes the Elements, a 93,000 m^{2} (1,000,000 sq ft) shopping mall.

The name Union Square is not well known and is seldom used, as people tend to refer the area to its constituent parts, such as the Elements mall, the ICC, the W Hotel and the various luxurious private apartment complexes.

== Planning and concept ==
The contract to build and operate the airport railway was awarded to MTR Corporation in 1992. The master plan for Union Square, comprising the massive air rights development surrounding Kowloon Station, was laid out by TFP Farrells. The architects envisioned a three-dimensional mixed-use urban quarter, with numerous towers sitting atop a massive podium.

According to Sir Terry Farrell, MTR Corporation initially wanted a dispersed train station with discreet entrances, but he argued for a grand station hall concept with layered space oriented around Kowloon station providing a central focal point. Transport infrastructure occupies the underground level and first floor – loading facilities and platforms for MTR trains on the Tung Chung and Airport Express lines occupying the sub-terranean level; while the ground level has bus stations, parking garage entrances and mechanical rooms. The Elements Mall on the upper decks takes up 146,000 square metres (1,570,000 sq ft), with retail space occupied by luxury brands, chain stores, a cinema, a supermarket, restaurants, and an ice rink.

On the roof of the Union Square shopping mall, three storeys above the ground, is a pseudo ground level public place with walkways, gardens and a central plaza surrounded by outdoor cafés and bars. Entrances to the various building complexes of Union Square are located on this level. Although Union Square was conceived as an interconnected space centred on transport infrastructure, it was criticised in a 2013 University of Hong Kong study as being cut off from its surroundings, especially for pedestrians. Paul Zimmerman said Union Square is "an island of the rich disconnected from its surroundings", and a lesson for future urban planners. This concern is shared by Farrell, who said there were pre-determined site constraints, and little could be done to mitigate them.

== Building complexes ==
Completion	Buildings	Floors	Height
2000	The Waterfront, Tower 1	46	142.46 metres (467.4 ft)
2000	The Waterfront, Tower 2	46	142.46 metres (467.4 ft)
2000	The Waterfront, Tower 3	46	142.46 metres (467.4 ft)
2000	The Waterfront, Tower 5	46	142.46 metres (467.4 ft)
2000	The Waterfront, Tower 6	46	142.46 metres (467.4 ft)
2000	The Waterfront, Tower 7	46	142.46 metres (467.4 ft)
2003	Sorrento, Tower 1	75	256.3 metres (841 ft)
2003	Sorrento, Tower 2	66	236 metres (774 ft)
2003	Sorrento, Tower 3	64	218 metres (715 ft)
2003	Sorrento, Tower 5	62	212 metres (696 ft)
2003	Sorrento, Tower 6	60	206 metres (676 ft)
2003	The Harbourside	73	251.16 metres (824.0 ft)
2005	The Arch	65	231 metres (758 ft)
2007	The Cullinan, North Tower	68	269.92 metres (885.6 ft)
2007	The Cullinan, South Tower	68	269.92 metres (885.6 ft)
2011	International Commerce Centre	107	484 metres (1,588 ft)

=== The Waterfront ===
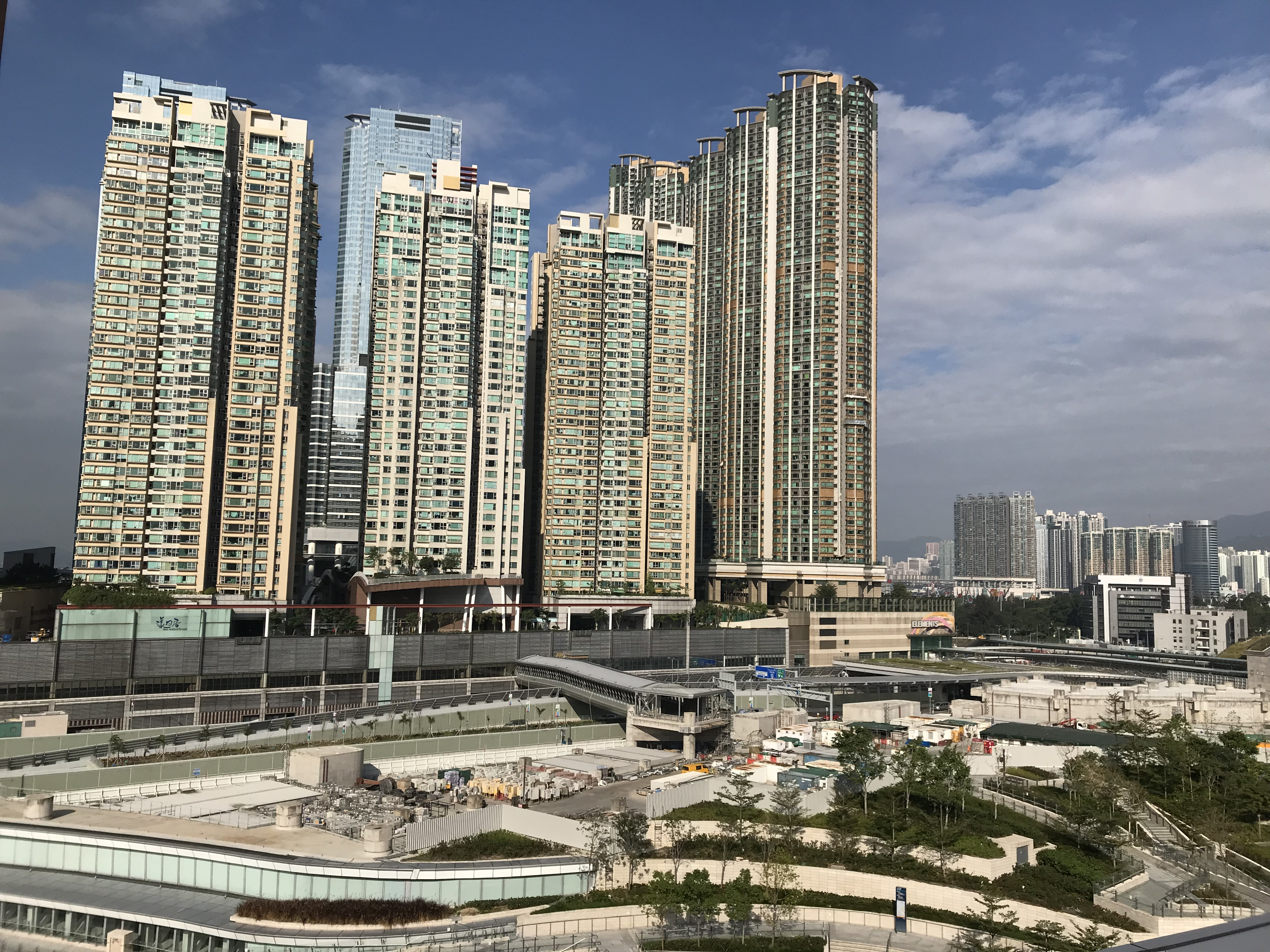
The Waterfront

The Waterfront (Chinese: 漾日居; Jyutping: joeng6 jat6 geoi1; Cantonese Yale: Yeuhng yaht gēui) serves as the phase I of Union Square complex, and was developed by the consortium led by Wing Tai Asia, including Temasek Holdings, Singapore Land, Keppel Land, Lai Sun Development, World-wide Investment and USI Holdings. The residential complex consists of 1,288 apartments in 6 towers and was completed in 2000, together with Dickson Cyber Express, a 70,000 square feet (6,500 m^{2}) cyber shopping mall of Dickson Concepts which was closed after the internet bubble burst. There is a private clubhouse with various facilities, such as swimming pool, badminton court, tennis court, dance room, reading room, karaoke room and a party room for holding different kinds of activities. The residential complex has its own underground car park for residents. There are a lot of greenings within the estate, and the whole estate area is non-smoking. Residents need to show their resident cards before entering the estate. Visitors cannot enter without permission.

The Waterfront is in Primary One Admission (POA) School Net 31. Within the school net are multiple aided schools (operated independently but funded with government money) and Jordan Road Government Primary School.

=== Sorrento ===
Sorrento (擎天半島)
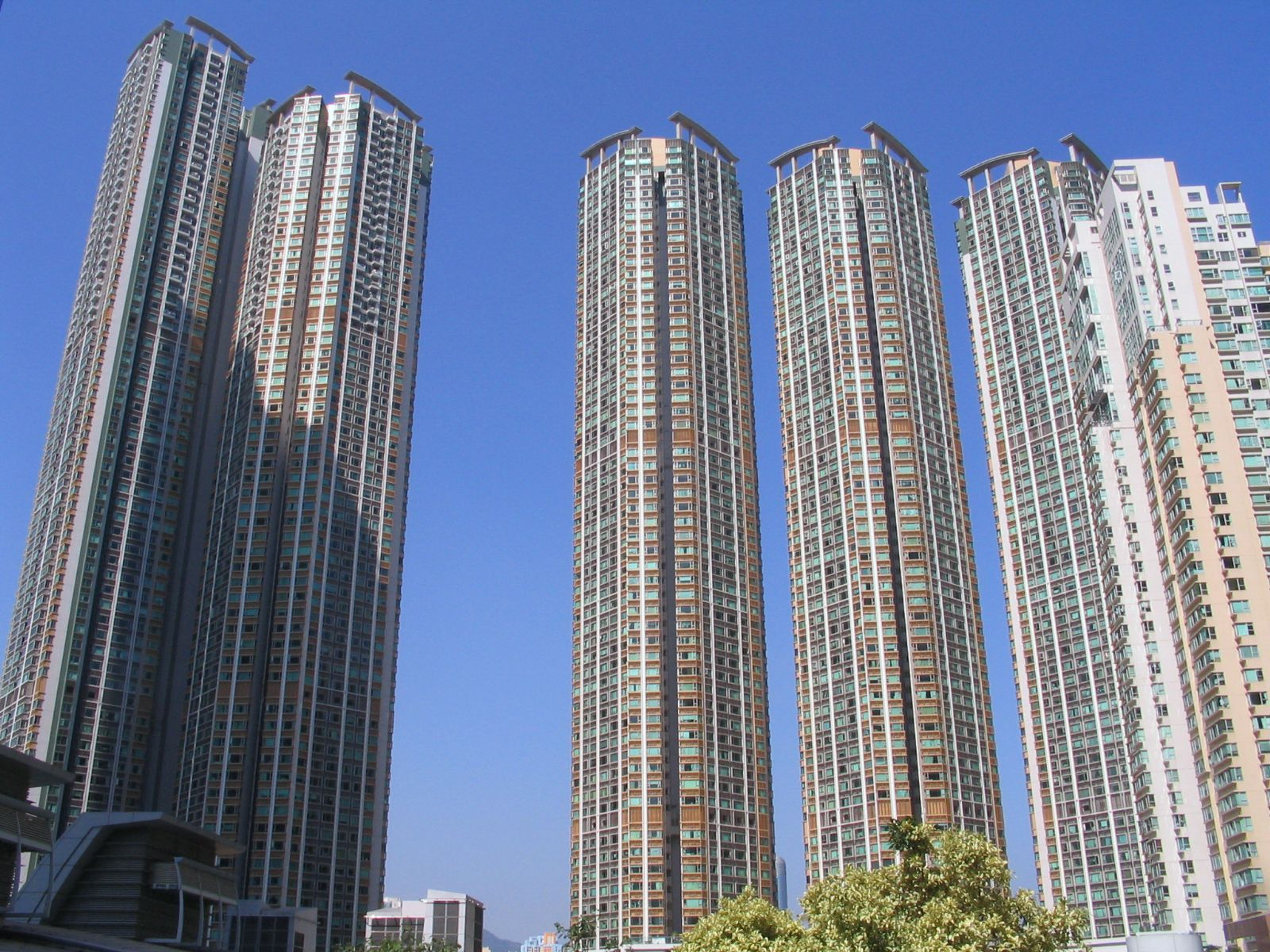
- Interactive map of the Sorrento (擎天半島) area

General information
- Type: Residential
- Coordinates: 22°18′23.7″N 114°09′44.2″E
- Construction started: 2000; 26 years ago
- Completed: 2003; 23 years ago
- Opening: 2003; 23 years ago

Height
- Roof: 256 m (839.9 ft)

Technical details
- Floor count: 75 (Tower 1)

Design and construction
- Architect: Wong & Ouyang

The Sorrento (Chinese: 擎天半島; Jyutping: king4tin1 bun3dou2; Cantonese Yale: Kìhngtīn Bundóu) is a residential complex occupying the northern edge of Union Square. The complex serves as the phase 2 of the development plan and was built by The Wharf Estate Development Ltd. and MTR Corporation. It contains five residential towers completed in 2003 and was designed by Wong & Ouyang (HK) Ltd.

The towers are named Sorrento 1 through Sorrento 6. As in many buildings in Hong Kong, tower 4 is omitted because, in Cantonese, "4" is a homophone for "death". All five towers follow the same design but reducing in height consecutively with the tallest being Sorrento 1, and the shortest, Sorrento 6. Sorrento 1 is 256 metres (841 feet) tall with 75 floors. It is the 2nd tallest residential building in Hong Kong and the 5th in the world. There are a total of 2,126 units in Sorrento. Between Sorrento 2 and Sorrento 3 is a gap, where a foot bridge connects the residential complex to Kowloon station and Elements.

Sorrento is in Primary One Admission (POA) School Net 31. Within the school net are multiple aided schools (operated independently but funded with government money) and Jordan Road Government Primary School.

=== The Harbourside ===
The Harbourside (君臨天下)
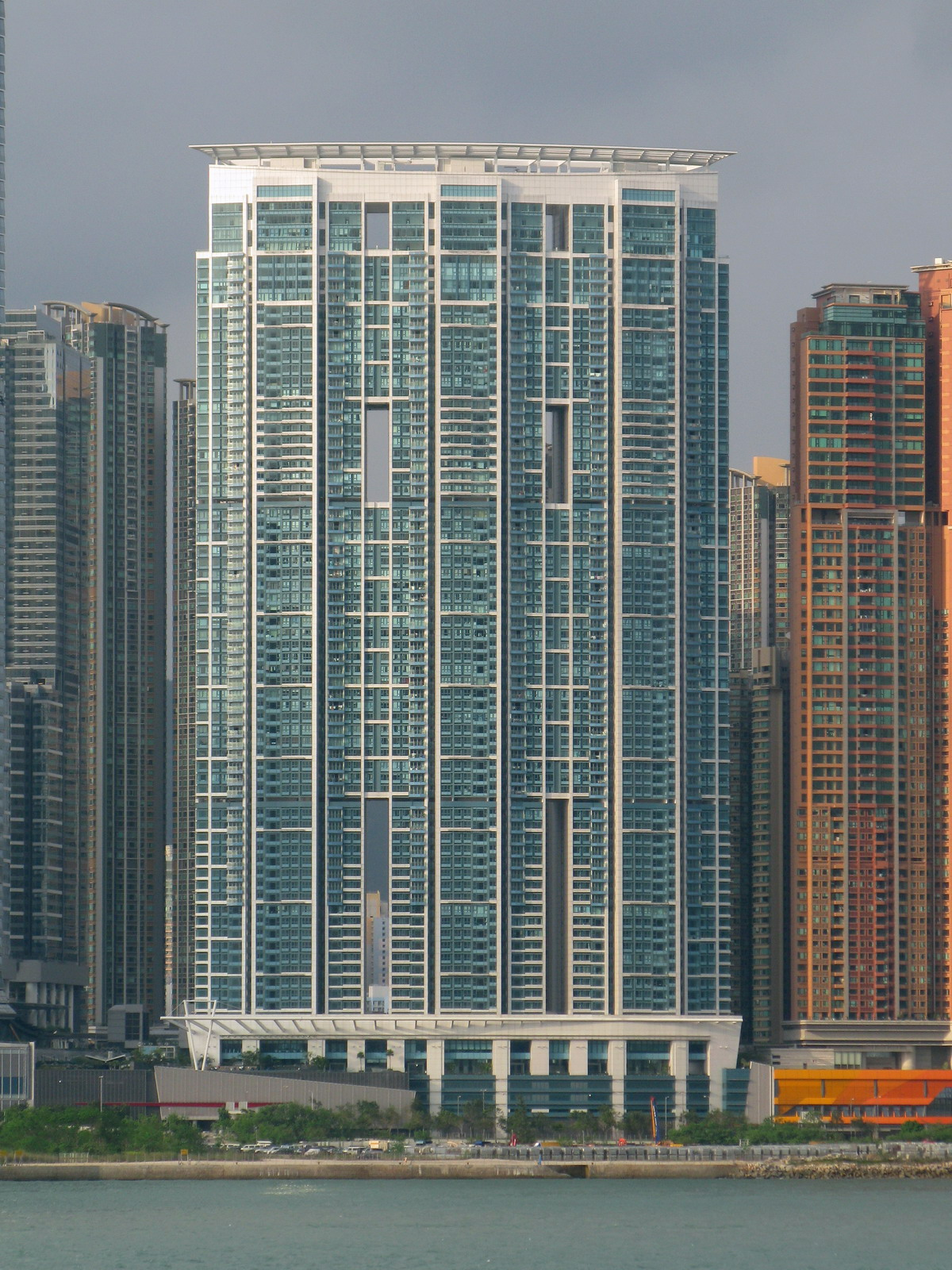
- Interactive map of the The Harbourside (君臨天下) area

General information
- Type: Residential
- Coordinates: 22°18′11.0″N 114°9′42.0″E
- Construction started: 2001; 25 years ago
- Completed: 2004; 22 years ago

Height
- Roof: 255 m (836.6 ft)

Technical details
- Floor count: 74
- Floor area: 128,845 m^{2} (1,386,876 sq ft)

Design and construction
- Architect: P & T Architects & Engineers Ltd.
- Structural engineer: Arup

The Harbourside (Chinese: 君臨天下; Jyutping: gwan1lam4 tin1haa6; Cantonese Yale: Gwānlàhm Tīnhah) is a 255 m (836.6 ft) tall residential skyscraper in Union Square, and serves as the phase 4 of the Kowloon station development. Construction of the 74-storey complex began in 2001 and was completed in 2004 under the design by P & T Architects & Engineers.

The Harbourside appears to be a one-wall building from a distance. However, there are actually three towers joined in the base, middle and top. The gaps between the towers help relieve the stress caused by wind since the complex has a large surface area, allowing it to act as a sail. All floors are used for residential purpose.

The Harbourside is the 91st tallest building in the world when measured up to the highest architectural point.

The Harbourside is in Primary One Admission (POA) School Net 31. Within the school net are multiple aided schools (operated independently but funded with government money) and Jordan Road Government Primary School.

=== The Arch ===
The Arch (凱旋門)
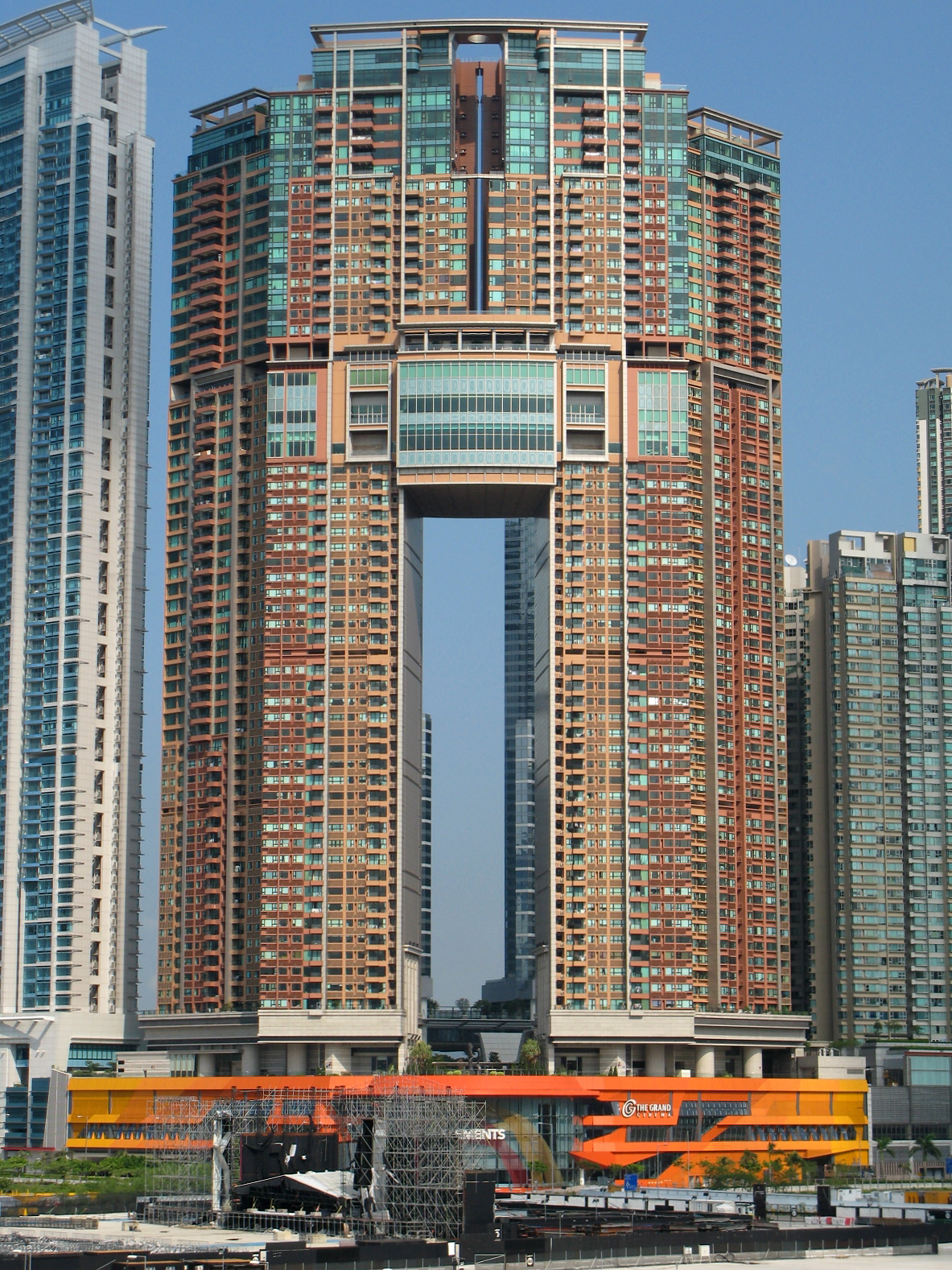
- Interactive map of the The Arch (凱旋門) area

General information
- Type: Residential
- Coordinates: 22°18′13″N 114°9′47″E
- Construction started: 2002; 24 years ago
- Completed: 2006; 20 years ago

Height
- Roof: 231 m (758 ft)

Technical details
- Floor count: 65 Above ground 2 Basement floors
- Floor area: 100,000 m^{2} (1,076,391 sq ft)

Design and construction
- Structural engineer: Ove Arup & Partners Hong Kong Ltd.

The Arch (Chinese: 凱旋門; Jyutping: hoi2 syun4 mun4; Cantonese Yale: Hóisyùhn mùhn) is an 81-floor 231-metre (758 feet) tall skyscraper completed in 2006 in Union Square. It is the third-tallest residential building in Hong Kong, consisting of four towers: Sun Tower, Star Tower, Moon Tower, and Sky Tower. The Star Tower is connected to the Moon Tower, while the Sky Tower is connected to the Sun Tower. The Sun and Moon Towers joined on the 62nd floor and above to form an arch, hence the name "The Arch".

Sun Hung Kai Properties, the developer of the project, was criticised for its sales tactics of The Arch in 2005, for the practice of "internal sales" in unfinished units, the absence of sale price-lists, and also for hyping sales for flats in The Arch by announcing inflated prices (per square metre) achieved. A buyer apparently paid HK$168 million (HK$31,300 per square foot) for a 5,360-square-foot (498 m^{2}) penthouse. Sweeteners were allegedly given (discounts given to the same purchaser on other units bought), but were excluded from the calculation. This allowed the company to raise prices of the next batch of 500 units by 5–10 percent. However, Sun Hung Kai Properties denied the allegations.

A 25m swimming pool is located on the 59th floor.

The Arch is in Primary One Admission (POA) School Net 31. Within the school net are multiple aided schools (operated independently but funded with government money) and Jordan Road Government Primary School.

=== The Cullinan ===
The Cullinan (天璽)
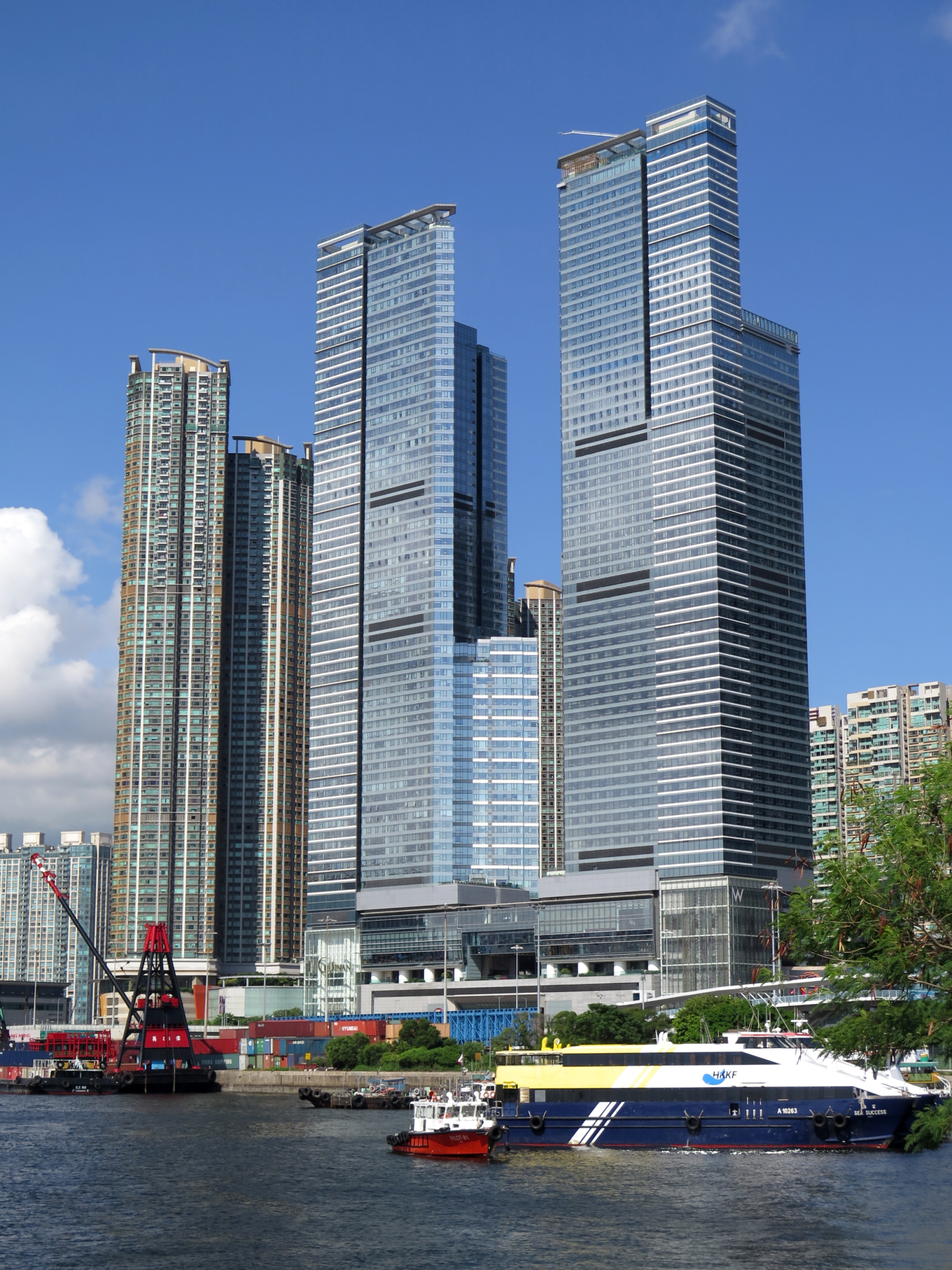
- Interactive map of the The Cullinan (天璽) area

General information
- Location: Union Square, Hong Kong
- Coordinates: 22°18′19.4″N 114°09′38.8″E
- Construction started: 2008; 18 years ago
- Completed: 2009; 17 years ago

Height
- Antenna spire: 270 m (885.8 ft)

Technical details
- Floor count: 68

Design and construction
- Developer: Sun Hung Kai Properties
- Structural engineer: Arup

The Cullinan (Chinese: 天璽; Jyutping: tin1 saai2; Cantonese Yale: Tīnsáai), phase 6 of Union Square, is a residential complex developed by Sun Hung Kai Properties. It is the tallest residential complex in Hong Kong, with 68 storeys and a height of 270 metres (886 feet). It consists of two towers, the North Tower and the South Tower, both of which were completed in 2008 and 2009 consecutively.

The residential complex was named after the 3,106-carat (621.2 g) Cullinan Diamond, the largest diamond in the world, found in 1905. The Cullinan complex was planned to be 45 storeys until the cancellation of Union Square phase 5. The number of floors was then increased to the current 68.

=== International Commerce Centre ===
The International Commerce Centre (ICC), which serves as phase 7 of Union Square, is a 118-floor, 484-meter (1,588 ft) commercial skyscraper completed in 2010, owned and jointly developed by MTR Corporation and Sun Hung Kai Properties. The tower is currently the world's fourth tallest as well as the tallest building in Hong Kong, and features a five-star hotel, office spaces, a fitness center, and an observation deck. The five-star Ritz-Carlton Hotel currently occupies floors 102 to 118.

== Shopping complex ==
Elements, the shopping mall in Union Square, occupies 93,000 m^{2} (1,000,000 sq ft) of retail space. The mall has a total of 123 shops and also features an ice rink, and the 1600-seat Grand Cinema multiplex, which is currently the largest cinema complex in Hong Kong.

== Access ==
Union Square can be accessed easily by public transportation, including MTR, Kowloon Motor Bus and the minibus services. The Kowloon station serves both the Airport Express Line and the Tung Chung line. The Austin station of the Tuen Ma line is also located near the area. The area is also close to the terminus of the Guangshengang XRL's West Kowloon Station.

== Image gallery ==
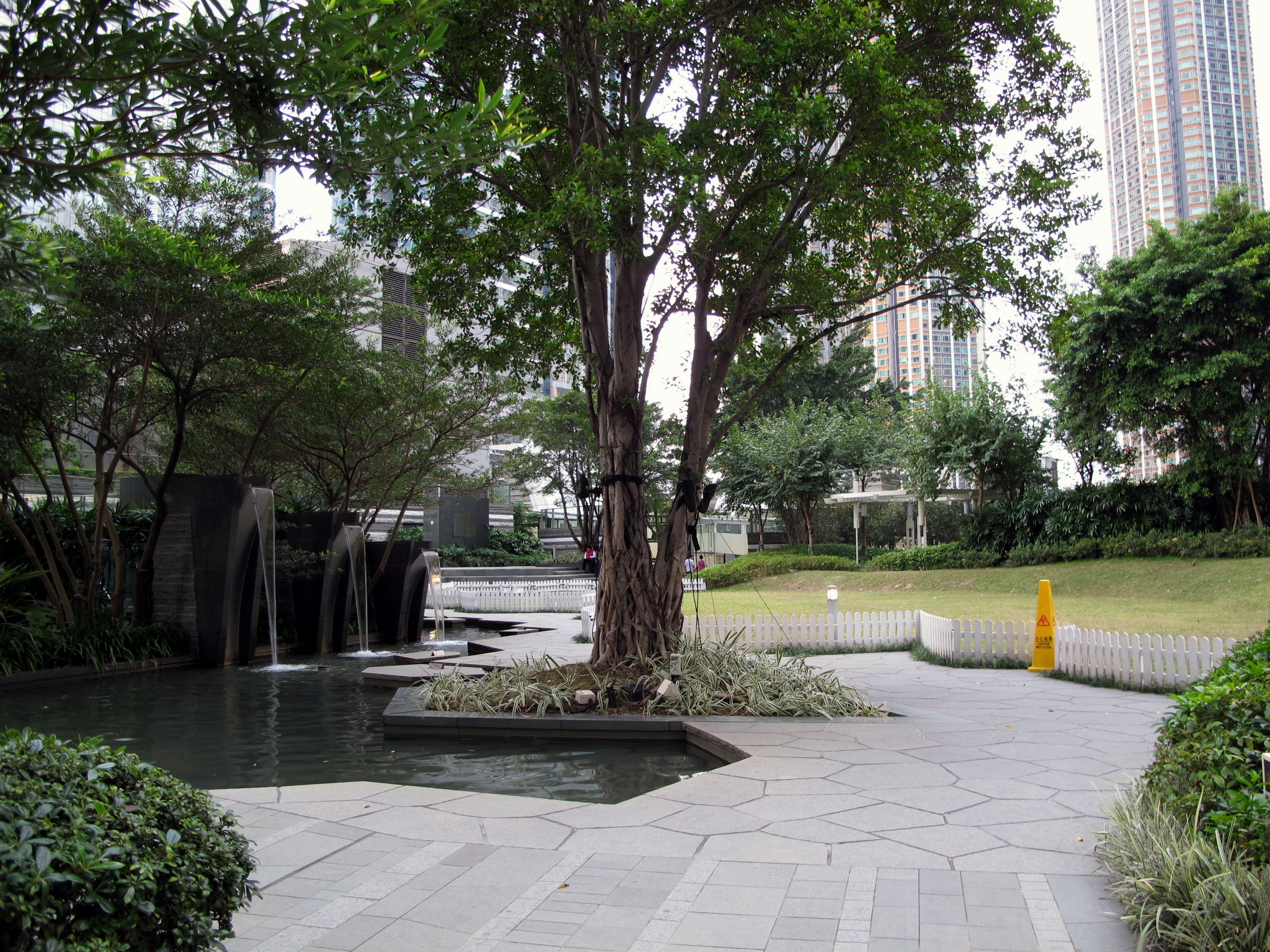
Public Open Spaces of Union Square

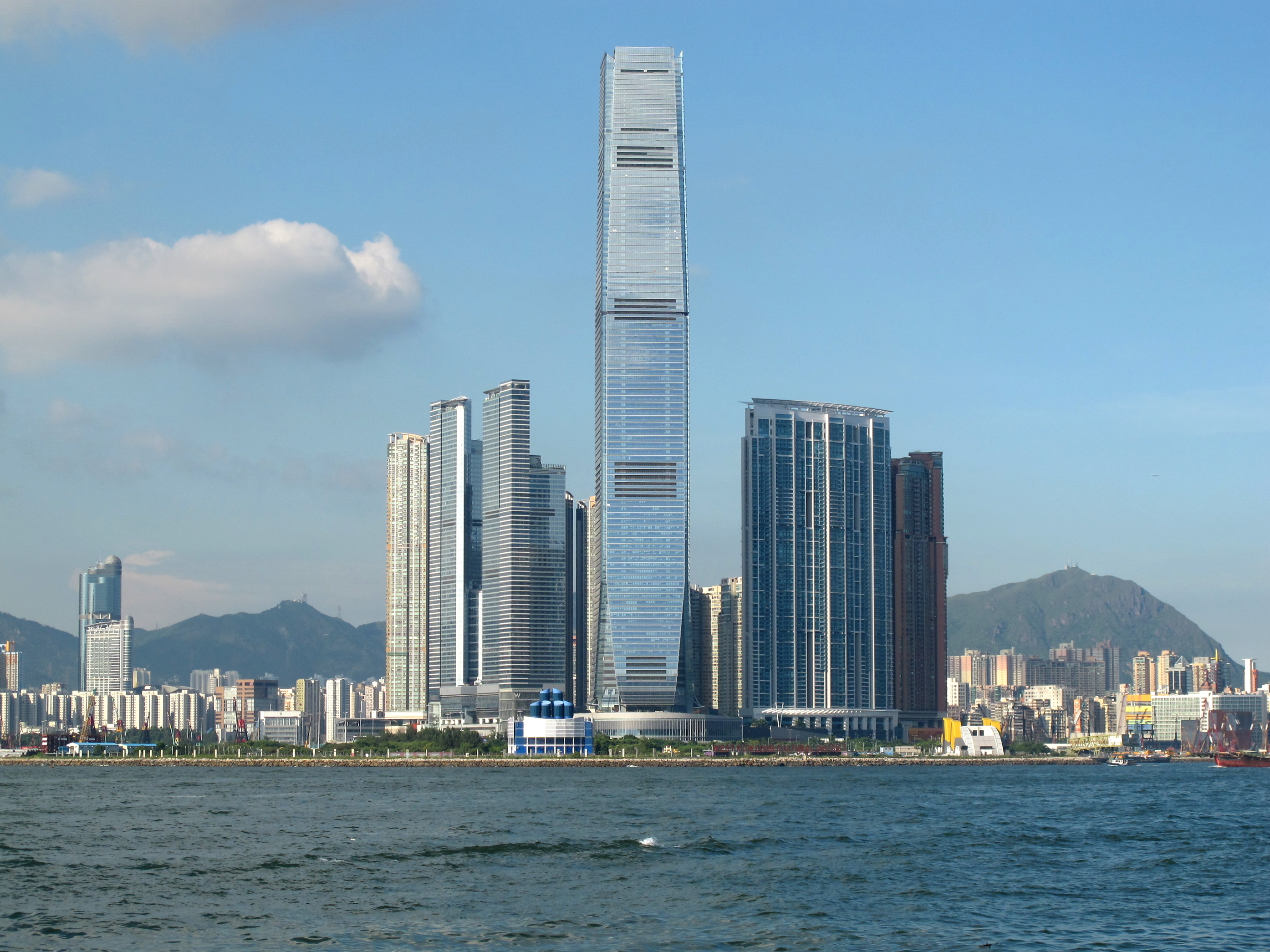
Southwesterly view of Union Square.

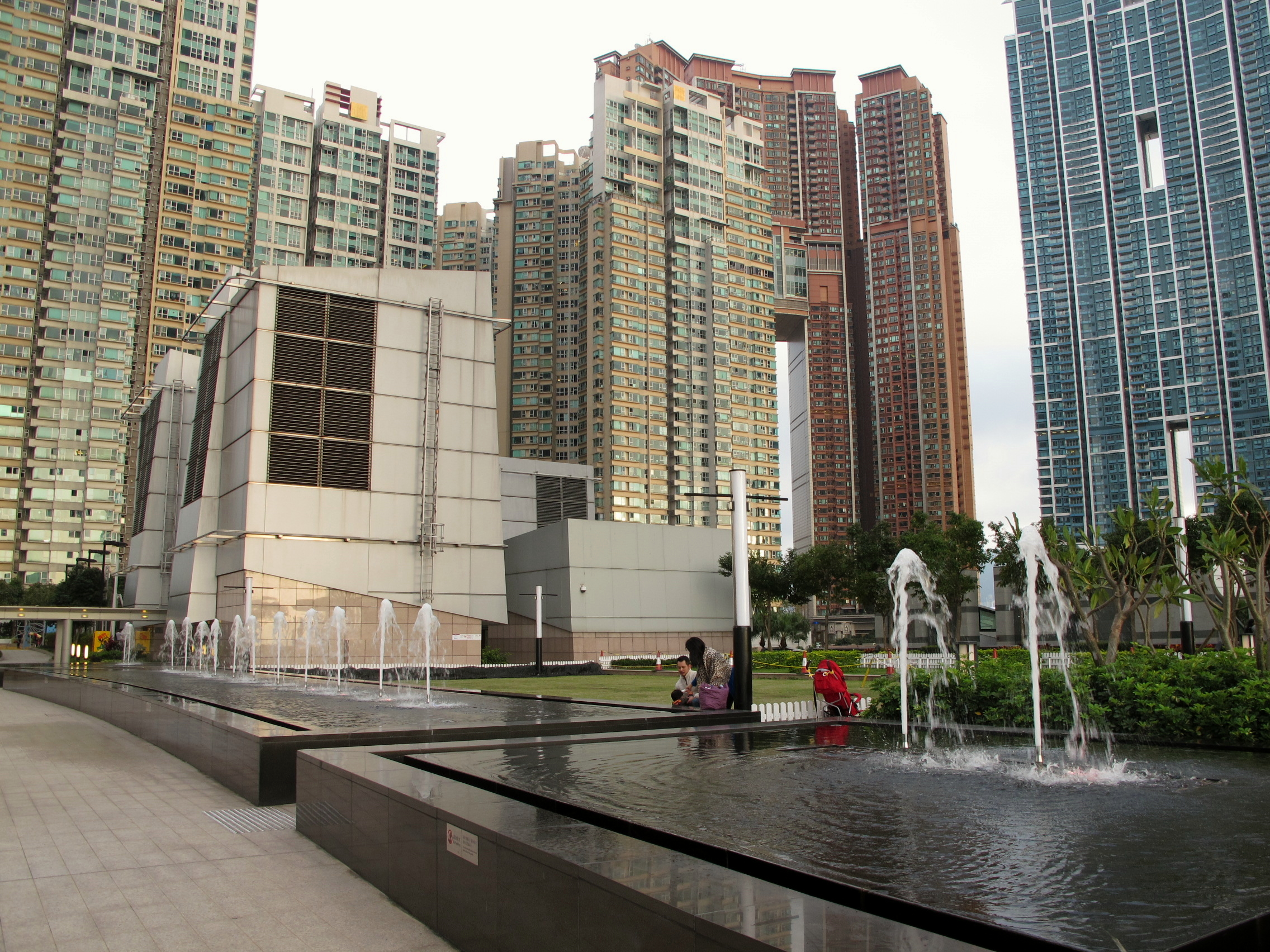
The Arch and The Harbourside viewed from inside the Union Square.

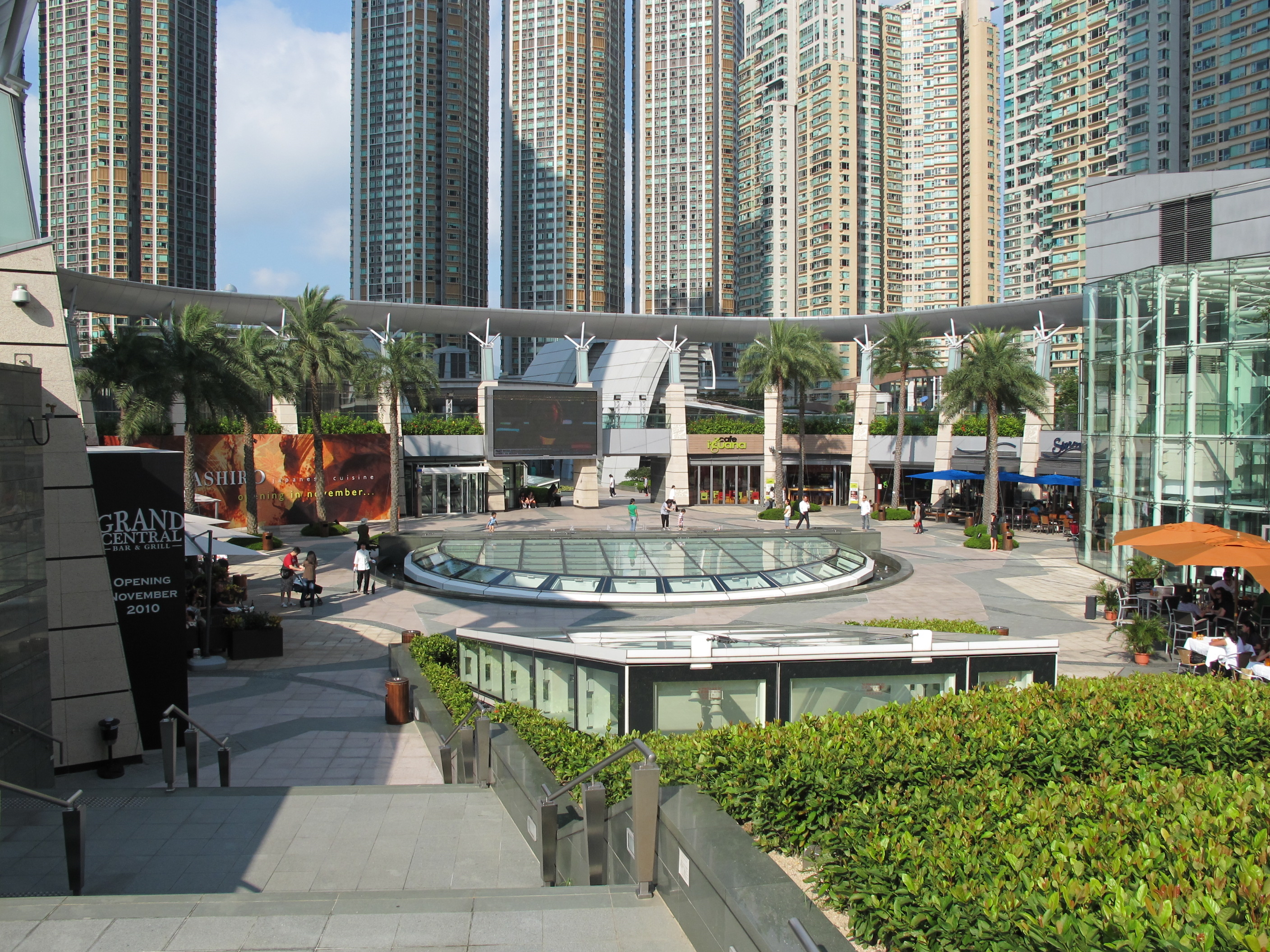
Civic Square inside the Union Square.

== See also ==
- List of tallest buildings in Hong Kong
