= Elements, Hong Kong =

Shopping centre in Kowloon, Hong Kong

Elements
- 圓方

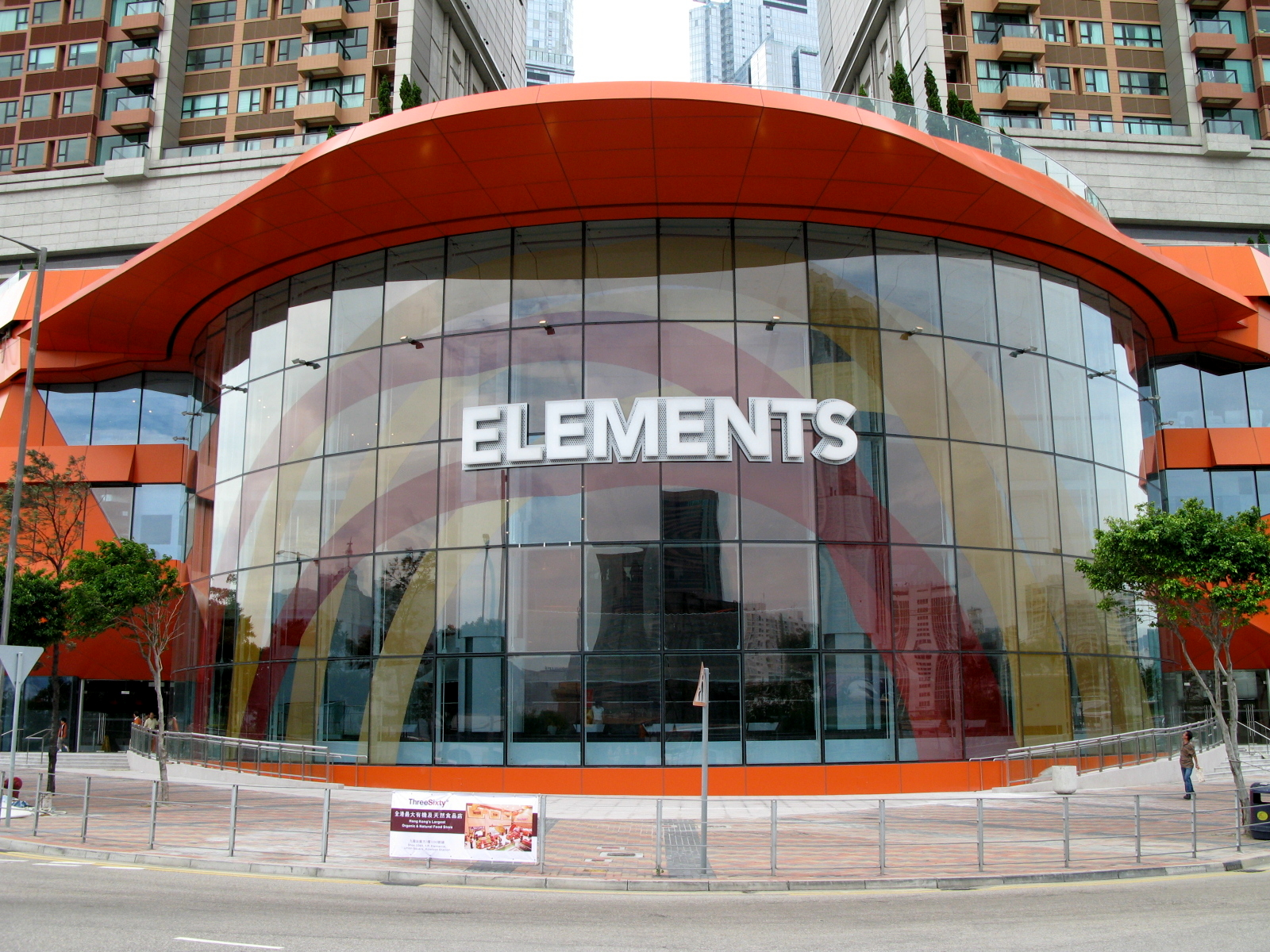
- Location: Union Square, West Kowloon, Hong Kong
- Coordinates: 22.30450°N 114.16135°E
- Address: 1 Austin Road West
- Opened: 1 October 2007; 19 years ago
- Developer: MTR Corporation
- Manager: MTR Corporation
- Architect: Benoy
- Floor area: 1,000,000 square feet (93,000 m^{2})
- Floors: 3 floors and 1 basement
- Website: www.elementshk.com/eng/elements/main/index.jsp%20elementshk.com

Elements, Hong Kong
- Traditional Chinese: 圓方
- Simplified Chinese: 圆方
Transcriptions
Standard Mandarin
- Hanyu Pinyin: Yuánfāng
Yue: Cantonese
- Jyutping: Jyun4 fong1

Elements (stylised as ELEMENTS) is a large shopping mall located at Union Square, on 1 Austin Road West, West Kowloon, Hong Kong. It is developed and managed by MTR Corporation through its subsidiary Premier Management Service.

== Description and architectural themes ==
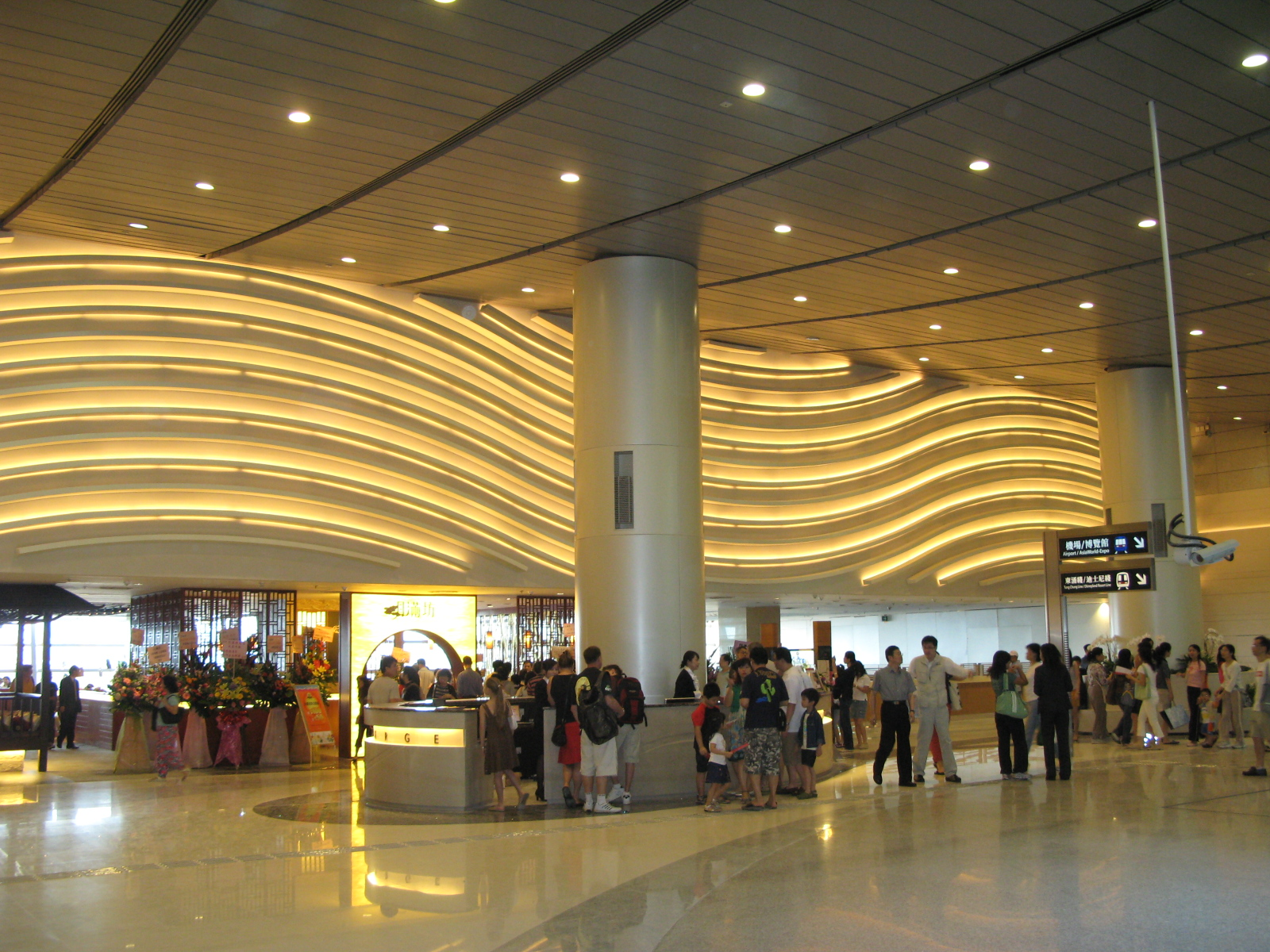
The exit to Elements from Kowloon MTR station

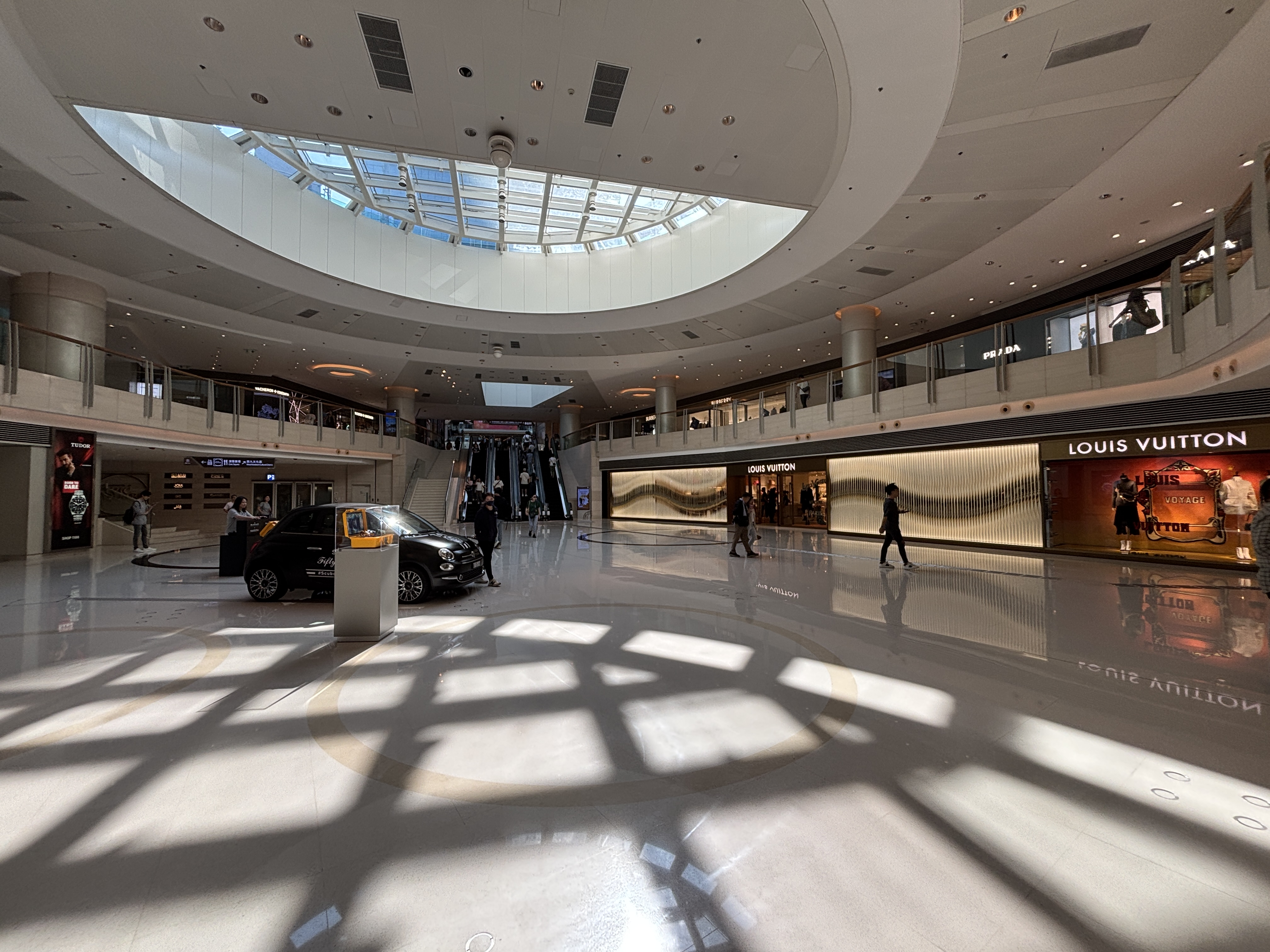
Main Atrium in Metal zone

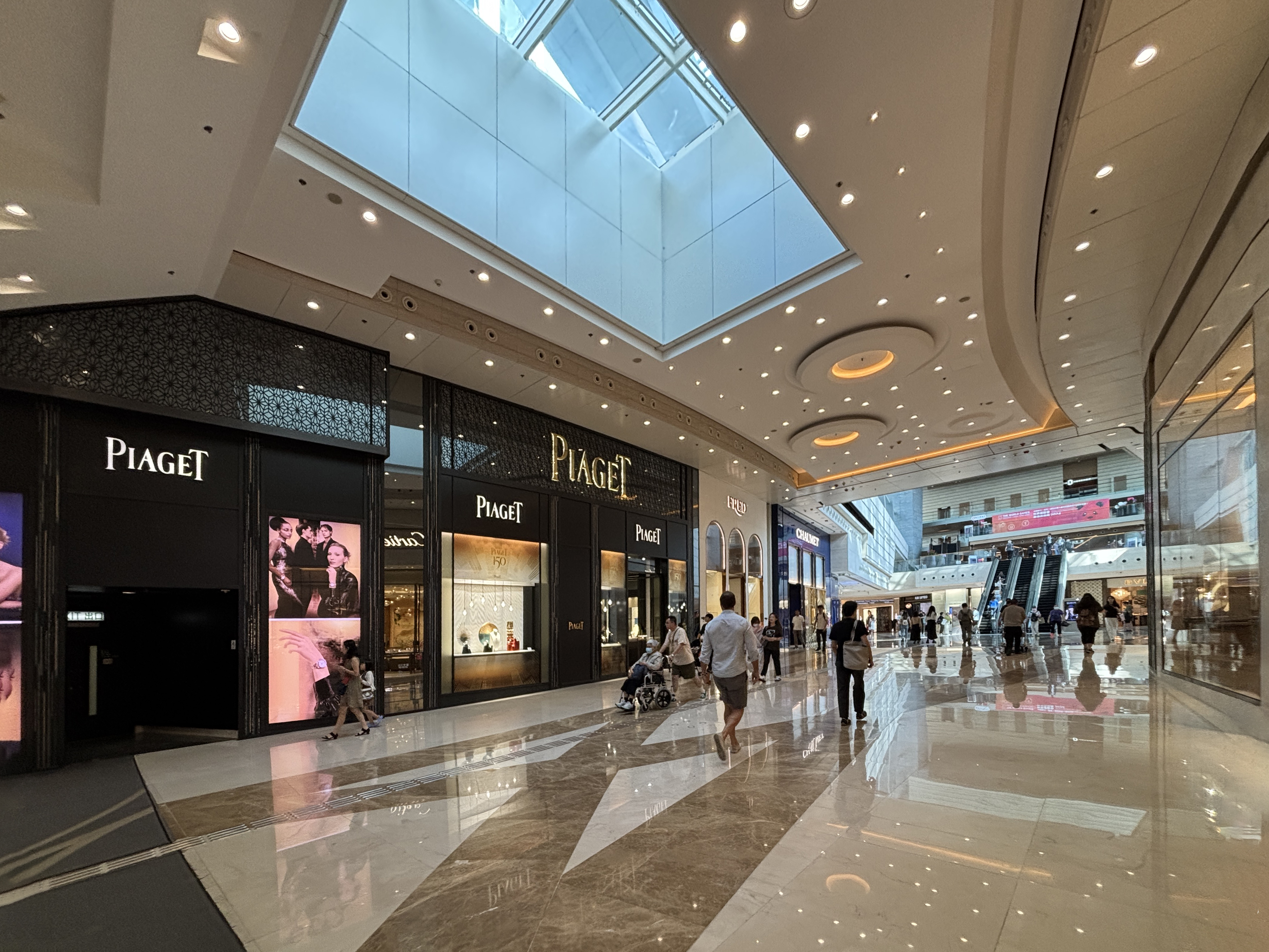
Metal Zone access to International Commerce Centre has several luxury stores

Symbols of the five elemental zones

Elements is located directly above the Kowloon MTR station, and connected to the International Commerce Centre, residential complexes and hotels above the mall, as well as a pedestrian footbridge linking to the M+ Museum and the West Kowloon Cultural District.

=== Zoning ===
The mall is divided into five zones based on the concept of the five elements of Nature, namely Metal, Wood, Water, Fire and Earth. Each zone is designed with a distinctive interior architectural theme that responds to the element, public art such as large scale sculptures are also employed to enhance the respective theme. The Wood Zone is highlighted by the sculpture/furniture "The Trails by Worms" and series of art works made of tree branches; the Water Zone is represented by the water feature "Harmony", which is a series of standalone reflective pillar measure (approximately) 9 meters (30 ft) tall with water running down the surface, creating the illusion of a solid yet liquid fountain; the Fire Zone is symbolised by the sculpture "White Heat" and the Earth Zone is symbolised by the sculpture "1/9", which is a set of rock formation, the number 9 is associated with the land where the shopping mall is built because the word Kowloon literally means "Nine Dragons". The Metal Zone is symbolised by metal rings hanging from above, it is also where high fashion and jewellery brands can be found.

=== Facilities ===
The Elements has a total of 123 shops as of 2008, along with an ice rink and the 1,600-seat Premiere Cinema (formerly The Grand Cinema), currently the largest cinema complex in Hong Kong.

The mall has ten washrooms, outside which there is a lobby with sitting area and magazine rack. Management said these are conceived for men "to wait for their girlfriends outside the washroom", providing "a decent and comfortable place for them to wait".

The shopping mall has a great emphasis on fashion and wardrobe with (as of 2008) 58 shops in that category out of a total of 123 shops in the mall.

== Transport ==
Elements is situated directly above the Kowloon station which is served by the Tung Chung line and Airport Express, which features in-town check in service. The mall is also directly accessible to the MTR Kowloon Station Bus Terminus by escalators, providing various bus and minibus routes.

Several pedestrian footbridges also connect Elements to the adjacent West Kowloon Terminus high-speed rail station, and the Austin station which is served by the Tuen Ma line.

Near the North and South entrances of the mall are vehicle pick-up/drop-off points, red taxi stands, and entrances to the North and South carparks. The mall has installed 12 Tesla Superchargers and 9 Destination Chargers in its carparks for electric vehicles.

== Gallery ==
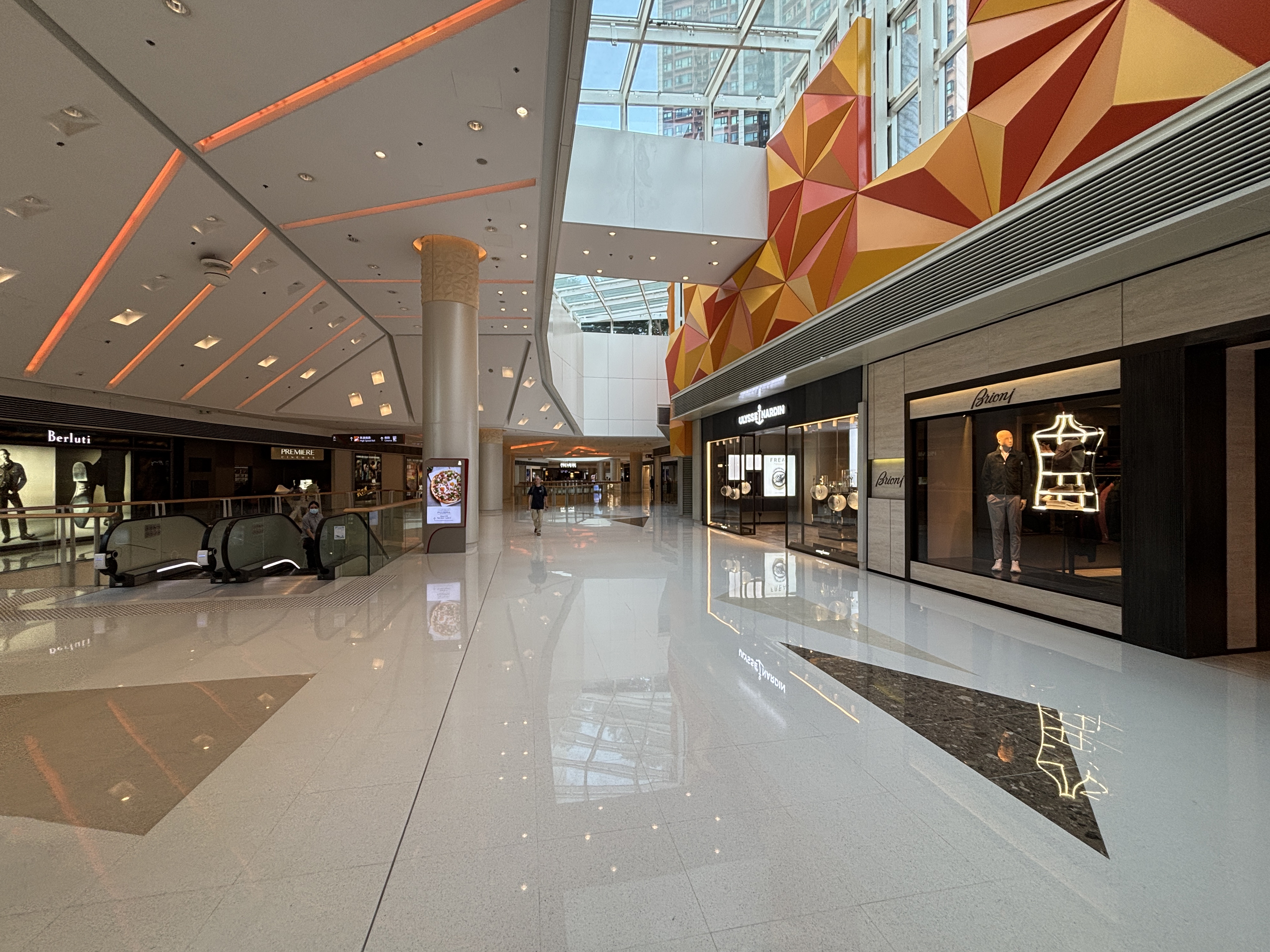
Fire Zone in Elements Mall

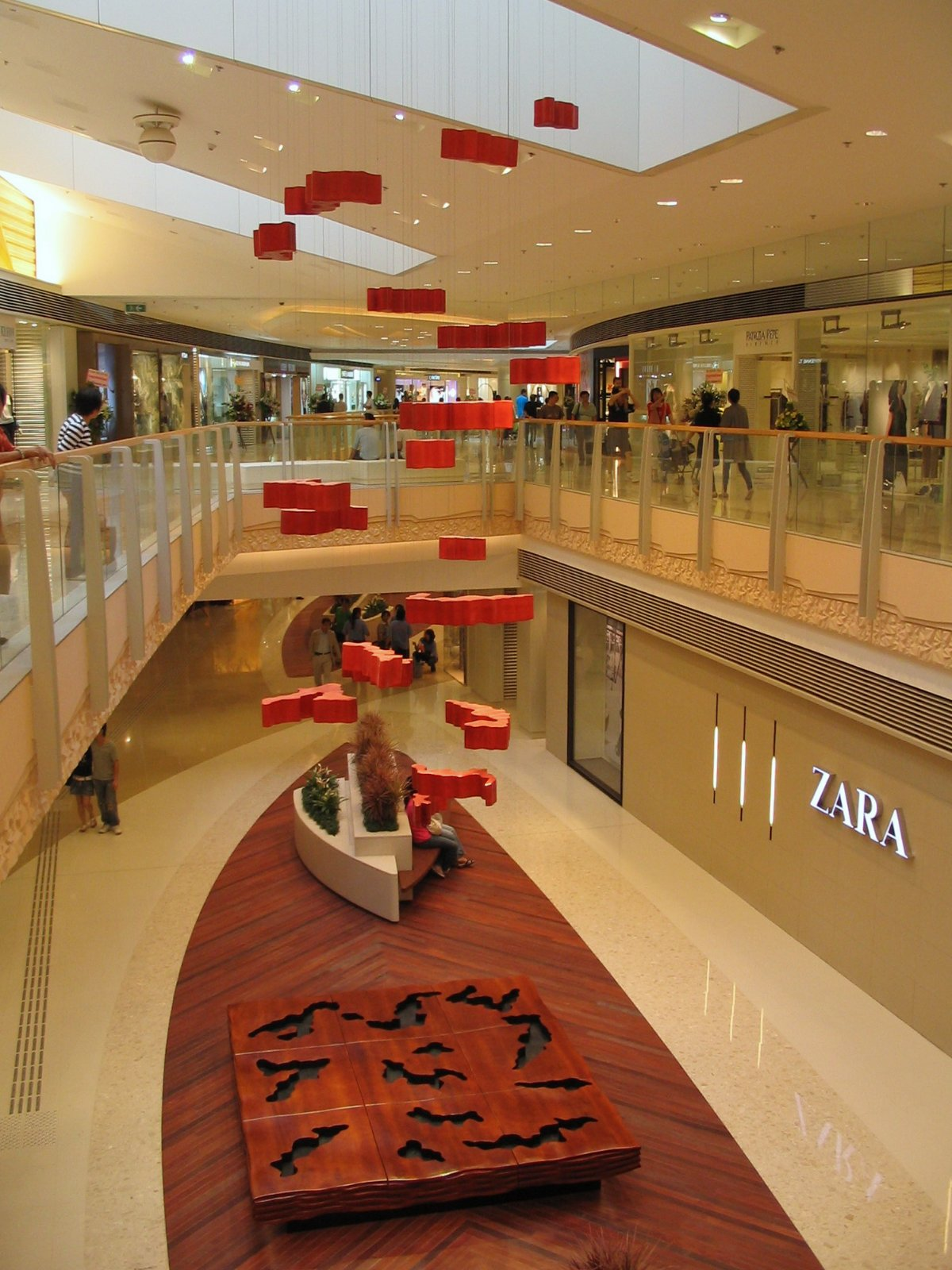
Art Structure in Wood Zone

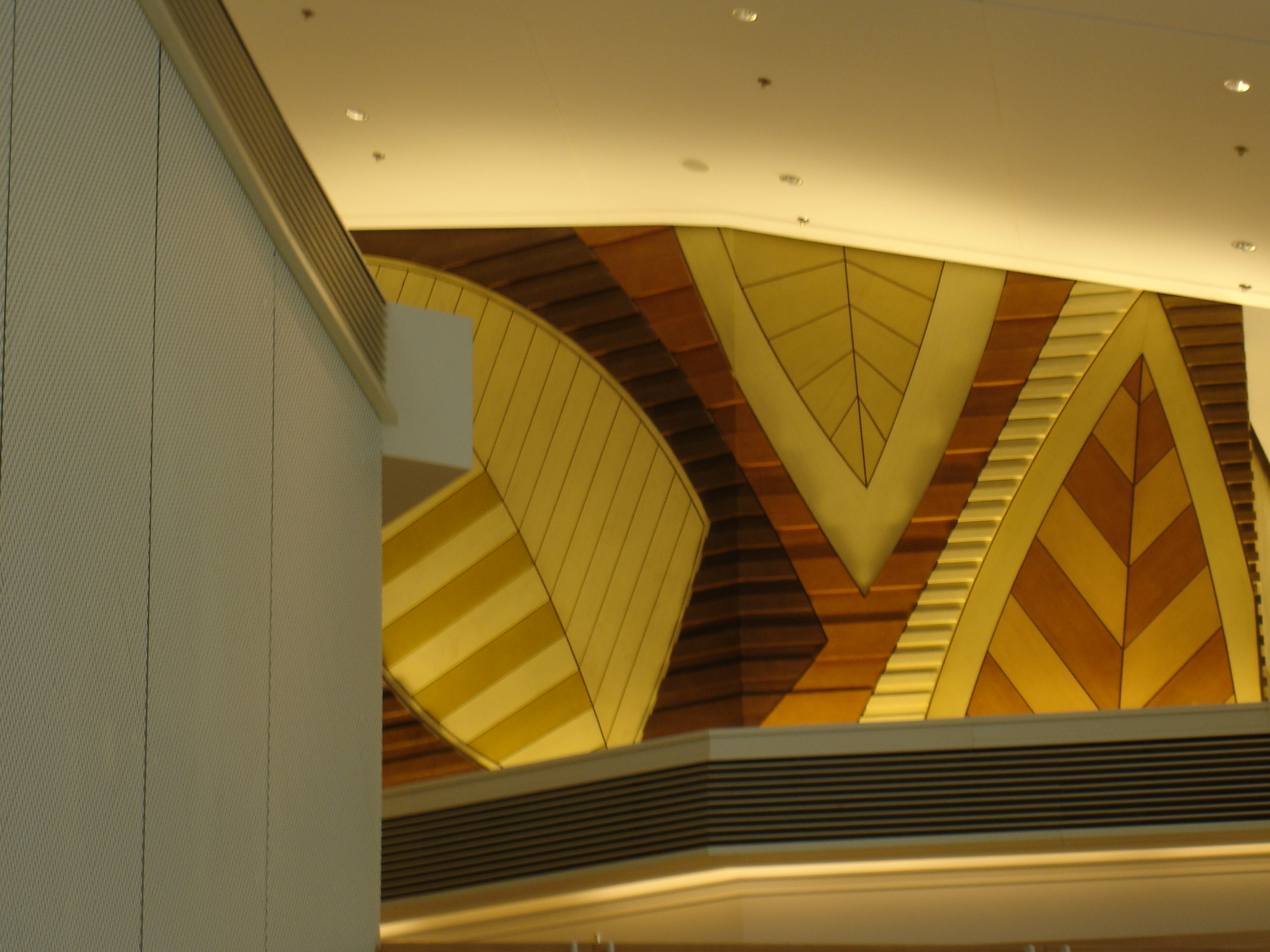
Wall of Wood Zone in Elements Mall

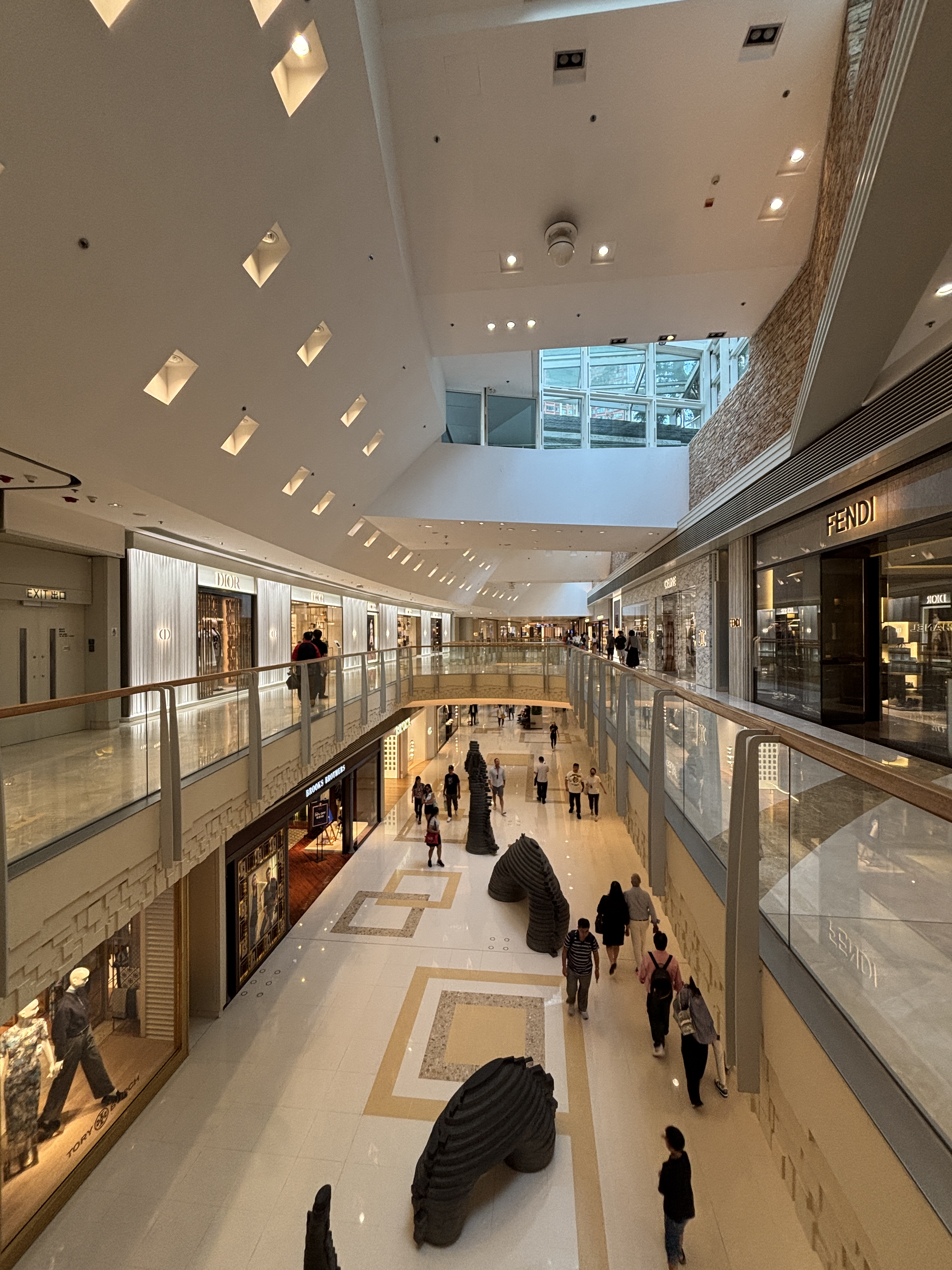
The Sculpture of the Earth Zone

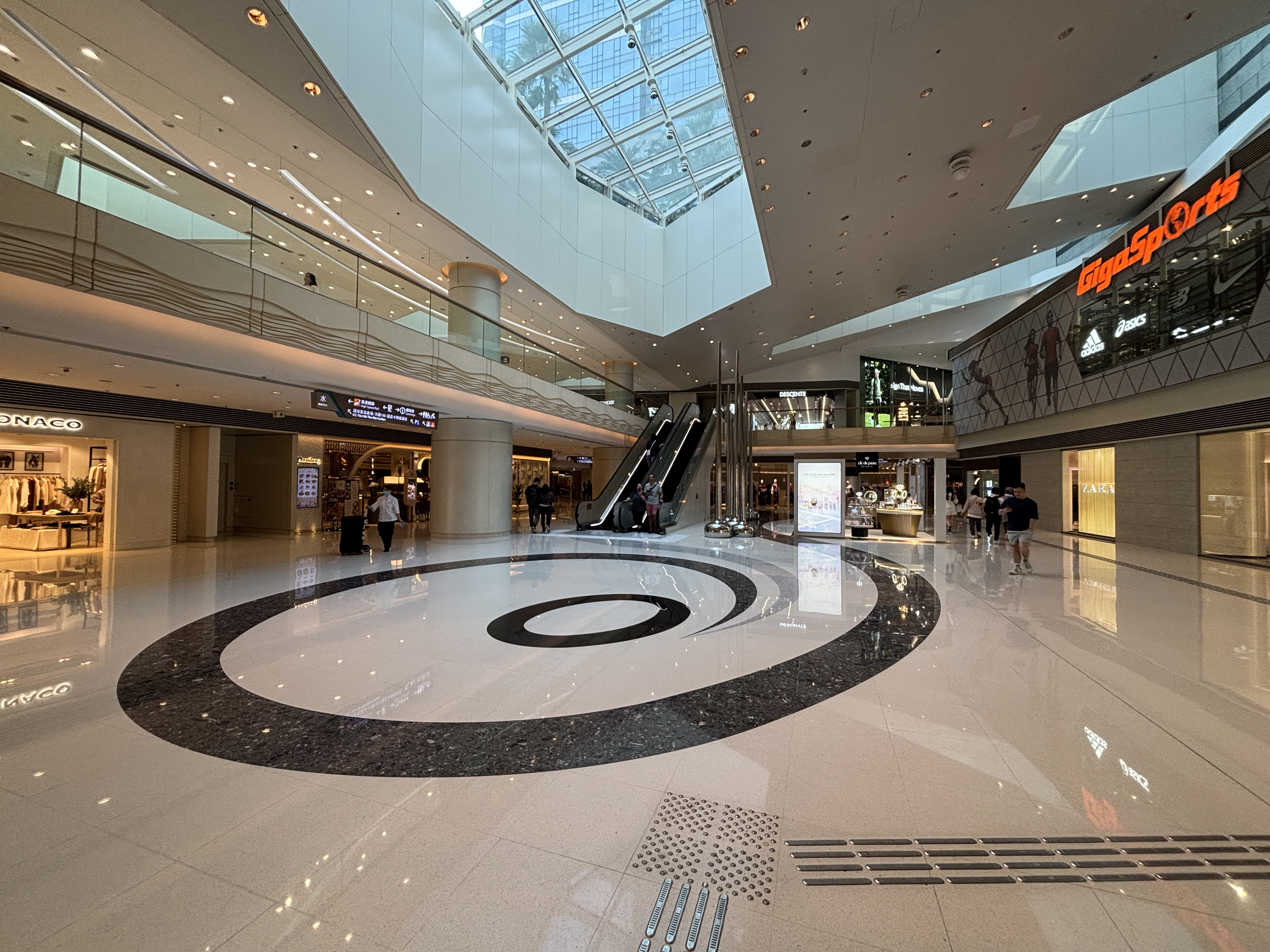
Atrium of the Water Zone

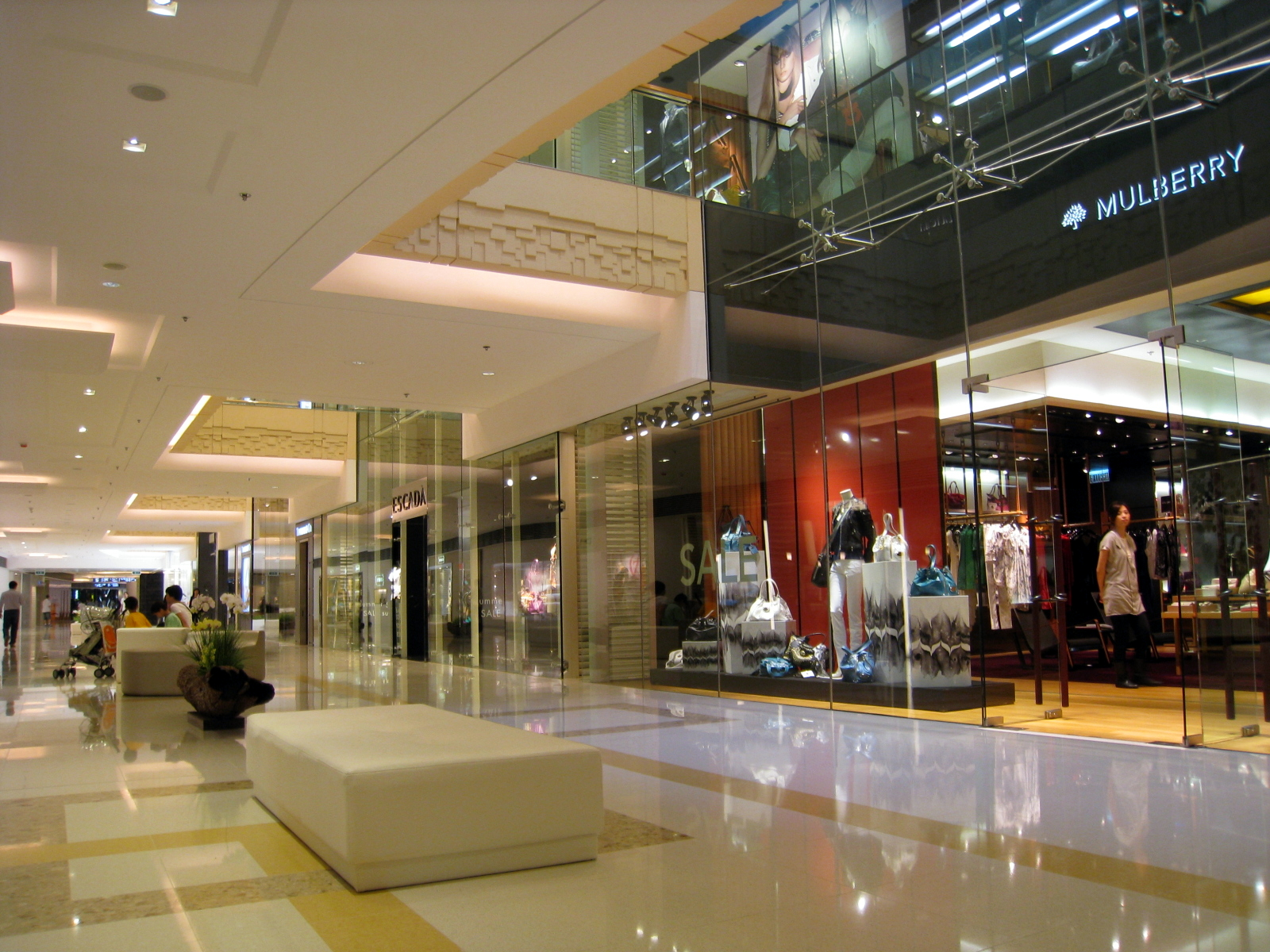
Store in Metal Zone

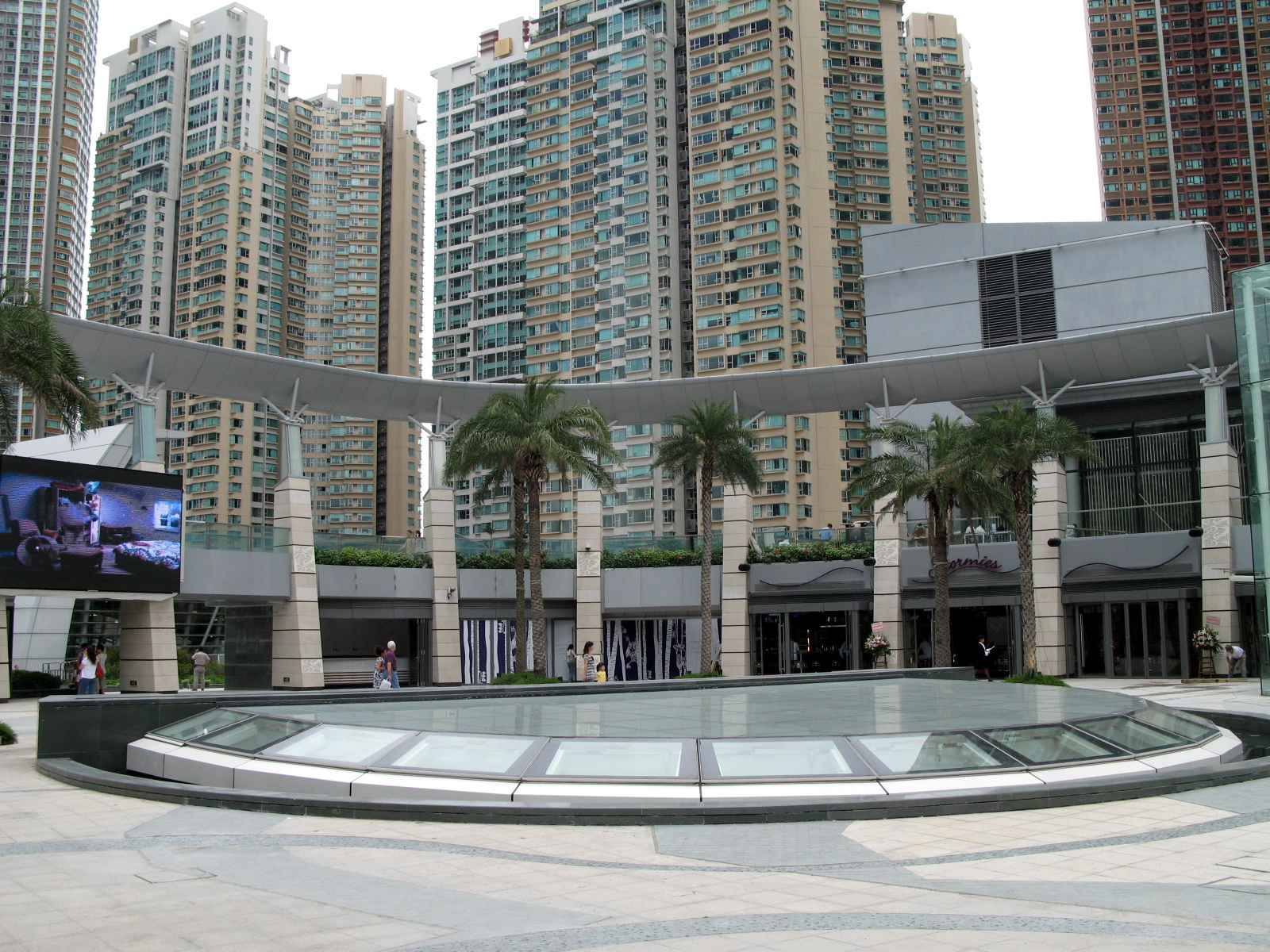
Civic Square

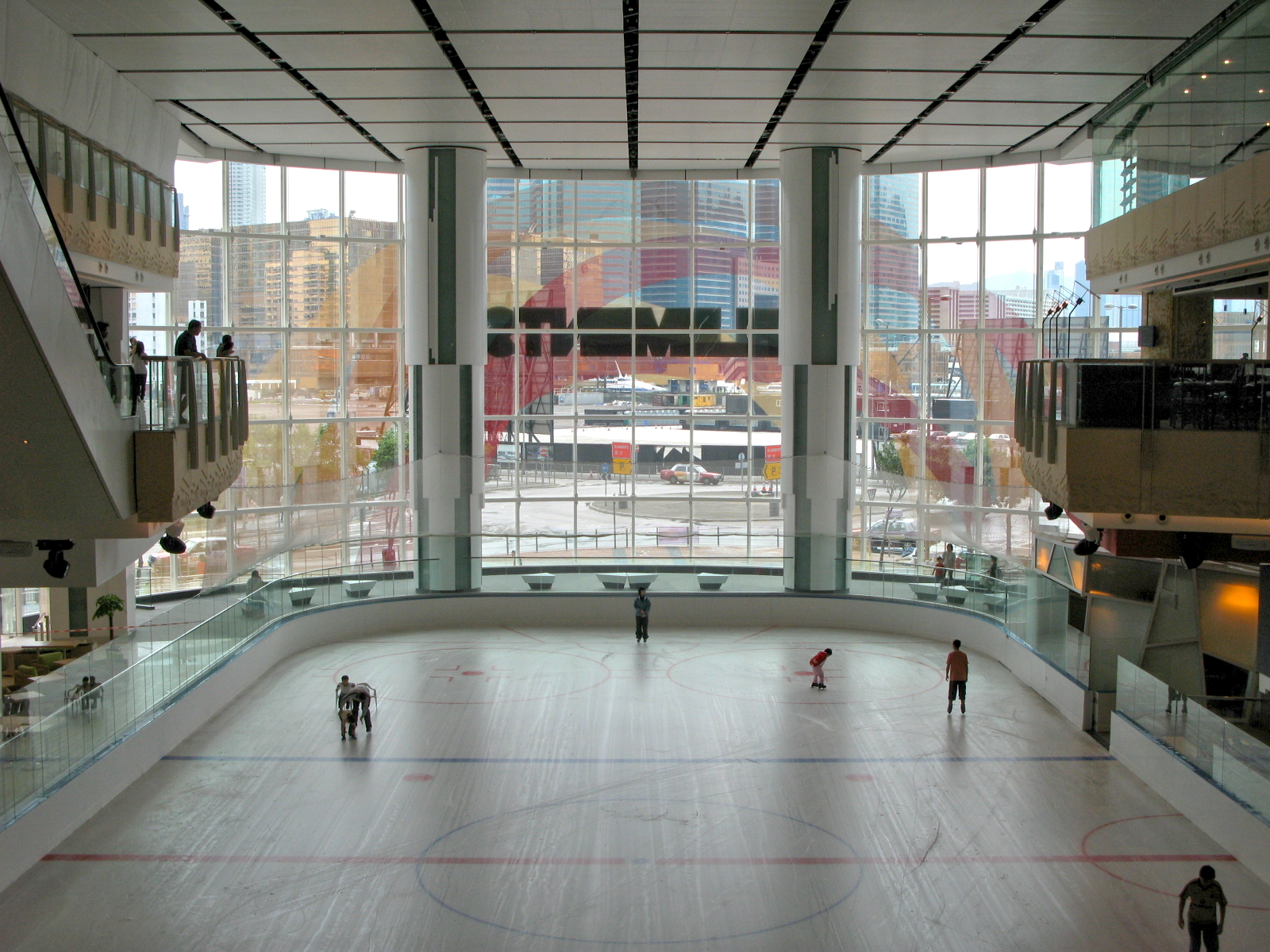
The Rink in Fire Zone

== See also ==
- Ice rinks in Hong Kong
