= The Grand Cinema =

Coordinates: 22.30390°N 114.16287°E

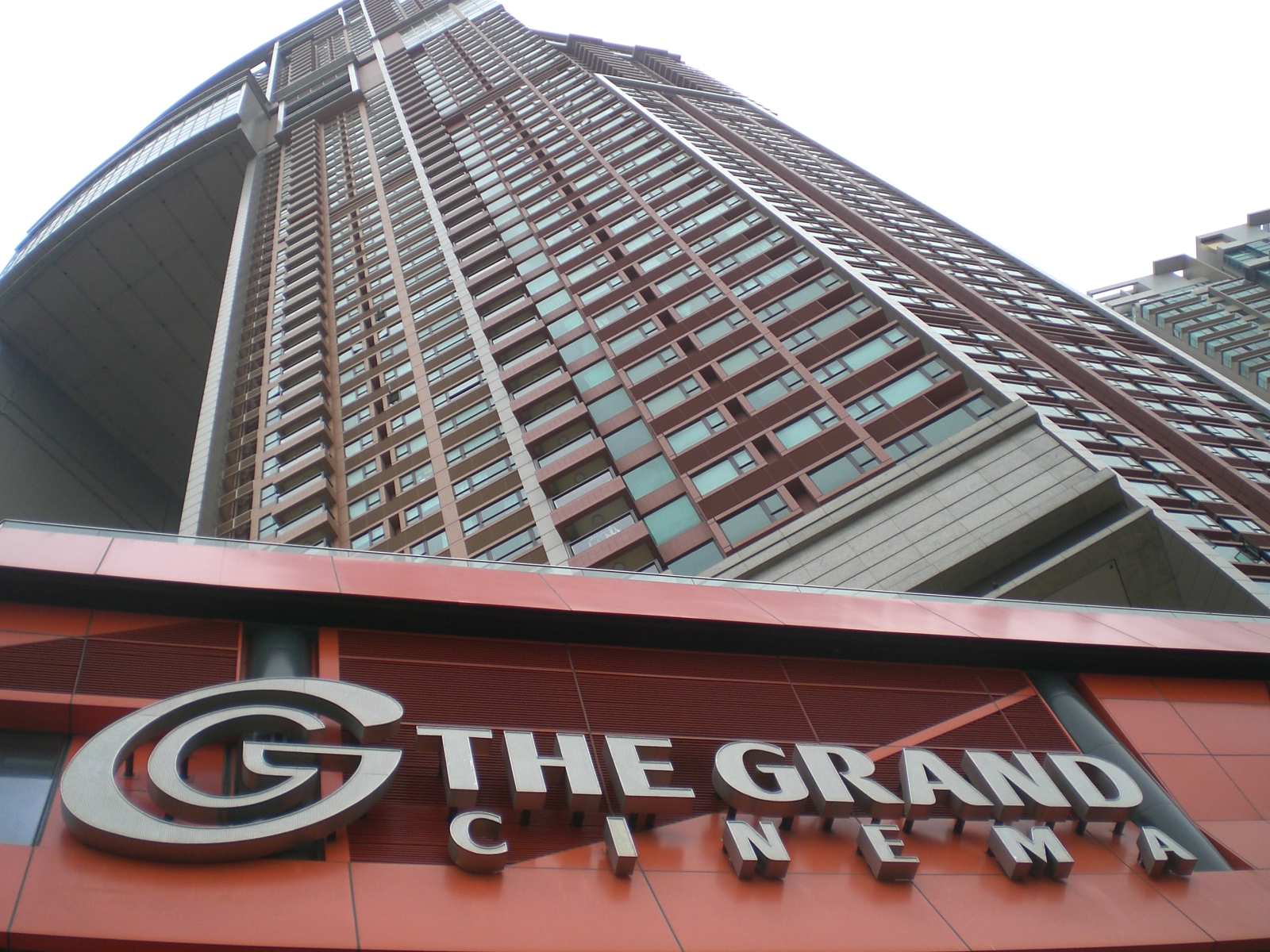
The Grand Cinema, outside

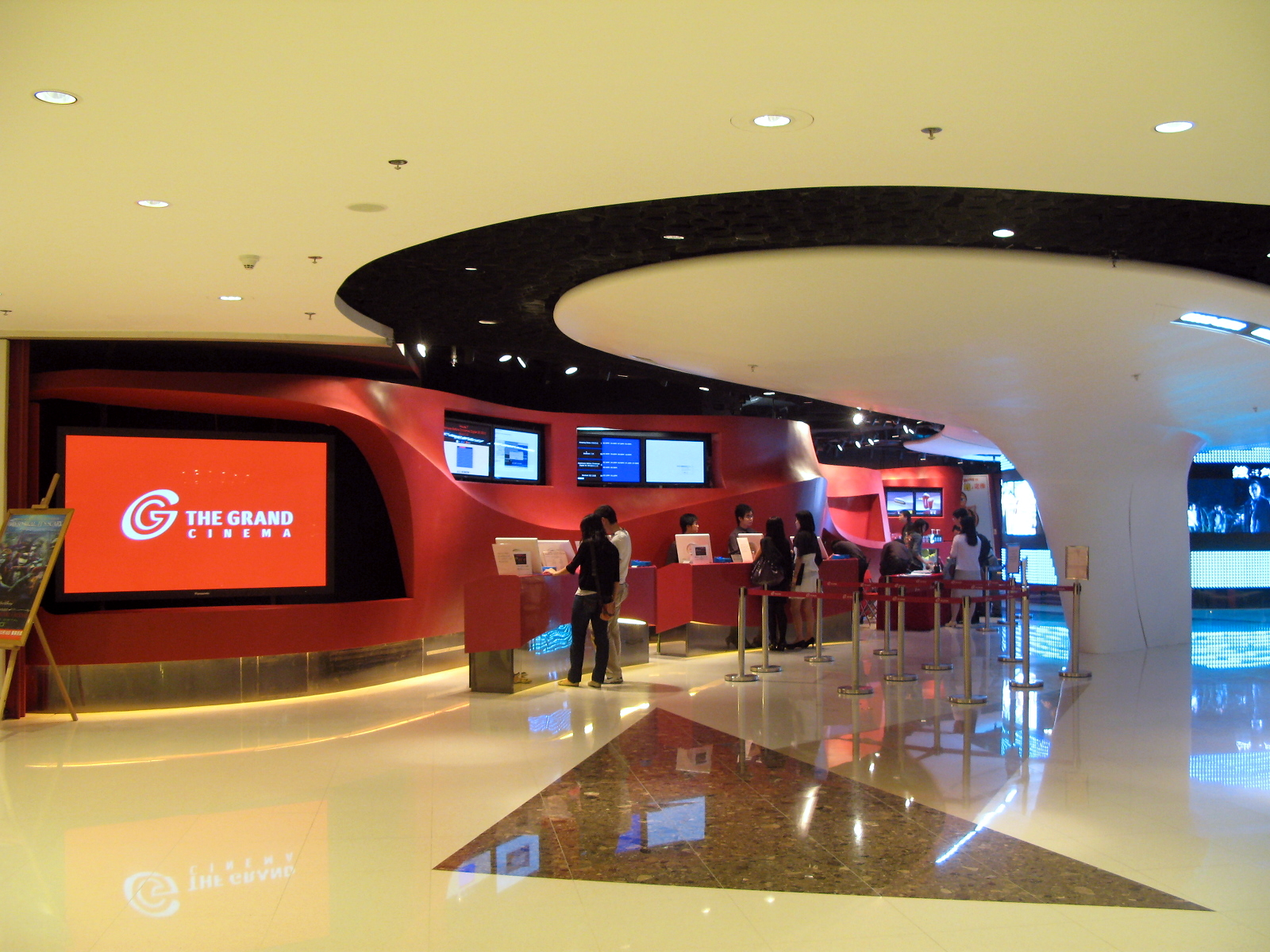
The Grand Cinema, inside

The Grand Cinema was a cinema complex located in Hong Kong in the Elements Mall at Kowloon MTR station. Operating from 2007 to 2019 with 12 screens and 1,600 seats, it was Hong Kong's largest multiplex cinema in its time. It had a sound system designed by American sound designer Tom Hidley and screened independent films. It also was the site of many film festivals, including the Hong Kong Asian Independent Film Festival. The cinema was operated by Shaw Group and Multiplex Cinema Ltd.

The former site of The Grand Cinema was acquired by Broadway Circuit and rebranded as the Premiere Cinema.

== See also ==
- List of cinemas in Hong Kong
