= Kowloon station (MTR) =

MTR interchange station in Kowloon, Hong Kong

Kowloon 九龍
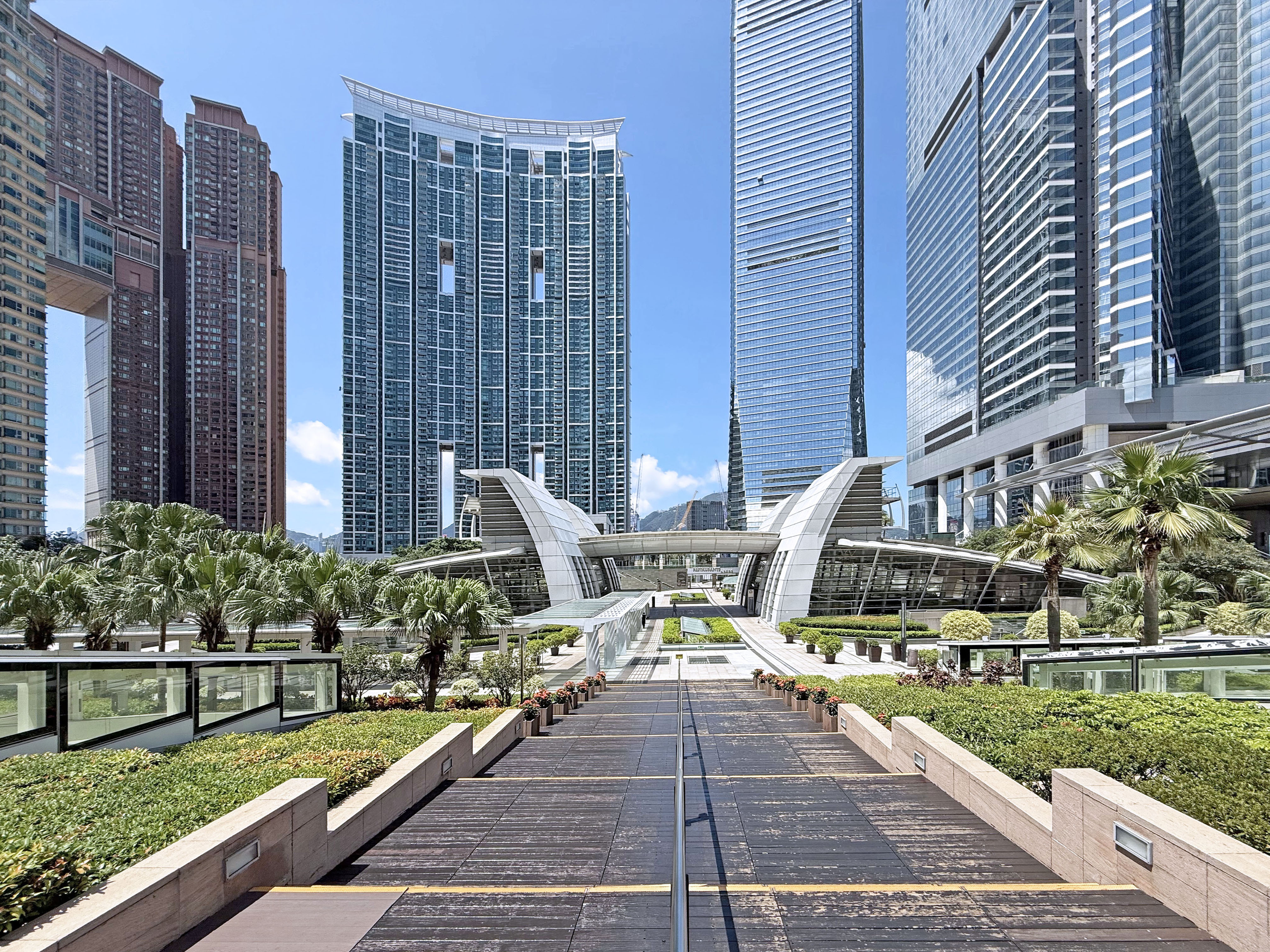
- Exits C2 (left) and D2 (right), in Union Square

Chinese name
- Traditional Chinese: 九龍
- Simplified Chinese: 九龙
- Cantonese Yale: Gáulùng
- Literal meaning: Nine dragons
Transcriptions
Standard Mandarin
- Hanyu Pinyin: Jiǔlóng
Yue: Cantonese
- Yale Romanization: Gáulùng
- IPA: [kɐ̌ulʊ̏ŋ]
- Jyutping: Gau2lung4

General information
- Location: Union Square, West Kowloon; Yau Tsim Mong District, Hong Kong
- Coordinates: 22°18′18″N 114°09′41″E
- System: MTR rapid transit station
- Owner: MTR Corporation
- Operator: MTR Corporation
- Lines: Tung Chung line; Airport Express
- Platforms: 4 (1 island platform on Tung Chung line and 2 side platforms on Airport Express)
- Tracks: 4
- Connections: Austin (out-of-station interchange): Tuen Ma line; West Kowloon; Bus, minibus

Construction
- Structure type: Underground
- Platform levels: 2
- Accessible: Yes
- Architect: Farrells

Other information
- Station code: KOW

History
- Opened: 22 June 1998; 28 years ago (Tung Chung line); 6 July 1998; 28 years ago (Airport Express)
- Former names: West Kowloon (During planning)

Services
Preceding station	MTR	Following station
Hong Kong Terminus	Airport Express	Tsing Yi towards AsiaWorld–Expo
Hong Kong Terminus	Tung Chung line	Olympic towards Tung Chung
Transfer at Austin
Nam Cheong towards Tuen Mun	Tuen Ma line transfer at Austin	East Tsim Sha Tsui towards Wu Kai Sha
Transfer at West Kowloon
Preceding station	China Railway High-speed	Following station
Futian towards Guangzhou South	Guangzhou–Shenzhen–Hong Kong XRL transfer at West Kowloon	Terminus
Track layout
Location
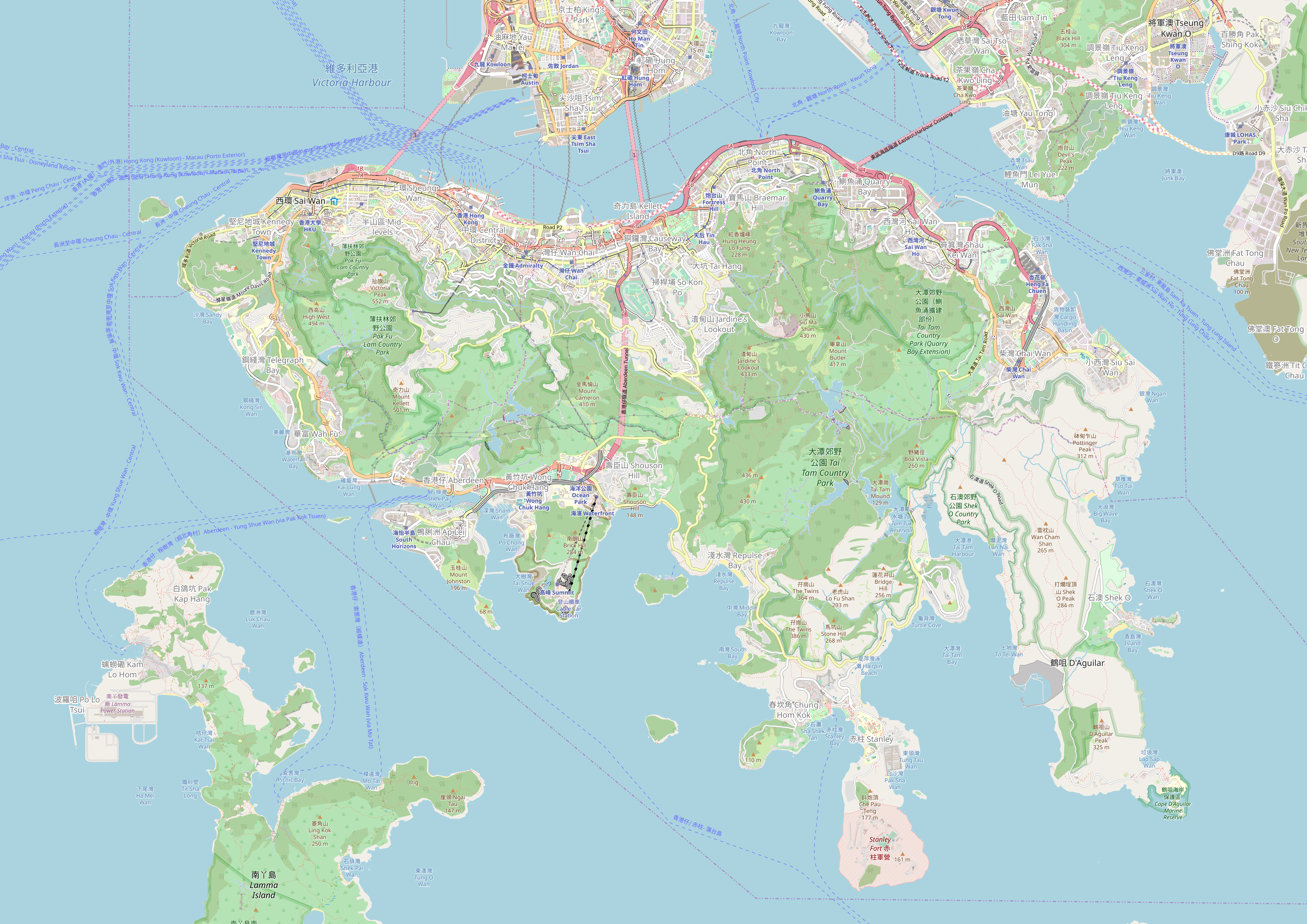
- Location within MTR Location within Hong Kong urban core Location within Hong Kong Island

Kowloon is a station on the Tung Chung line and the Airport Express of Hong Kong's MTR. It is one of the two Airport Express stations providing in-town check-in services for passengers departing from Hong Kong International Airport and free shuttle bus services to most major hotels in the Tsim Sha Tsui and Yau Ma Tei areas.

The station is located less than two hundred meters west of the Guangzhou–Shenzhen–Hong Kong Express Rail Link Hong Kong section West Kowloon Terminus, five hundred meters west of Austin on the Tuen Ma line and a kilometre west of Jordan station on the Tsuen Wan line.

Escalators link Elements directly with the station concourse.

== History ==
The station was designed by TFP Farrells. During the planning stage, it was called West Kowloon station (西九龍站). The construction contract (Contract 503C) was awarded to a joint venture of Kumagai Gumi, Entrecanales y Tavora, and Cubiertas y MZOV (both later merged to form Acciona) on 28 November 1994.

On 16 September 2000, the new shopping mall "Dickson CyberExpress" (迪生數碼世界) was opened by Dickson Poon. The size was 70,000 square feet (6,500 m^{2}) spread over four levels of the station with six shopping areas. However, the mall did not have the expected volume of customers and business was weak. After half a year, the mall shrank in size. The mall's management company planned to decrease the level of the mall from 4 levels to 3 levels and to combine some of the shopping areas. Business remained poor due to sparse population near the station and a recession at that time. The mall finally closed its operation in 2005.

The station was proposed as the terminus of the unbuilt East Kowloon line; the proposal indicated using a reserved confined space under the Tung Chung line platforms.

The station is connected via footbridges to Austin on the Tuen Ma line. The station is connected to West Kowloon Terminus of the Guangzhou–Shenzhen–Hong Kong Express Rail Link Hong Kong section.

== Morning Express service ==
The MTR offers Morning Express services to allow passengers to take the Airport Express from Tsing Yi to Hong Kong station. Commuters wishing to get to work faster can use their Octopus card at dedicated gates for HK$25. This offer is available every day except Sundays and public holidays from 7 am to 10 am.

== Station layout ==
As in other Airport Express stations, the Airport Express and the Tung Chung line have separated paid areas. Platform 2 is only used for disembarking passengers from Hong Kong International Airport or AsiaWorld–Expo, except during morning rush hours from Monday to Saturday for boarding passengers traveling on the line to Hong Kong station with a Morning Express Ticket.

U5	Residential and commercial area	Exits, Union Square, The Waterfront, Sorrento
U5	Residential and commercial area	The Harbourside, The Arch, International Commerce Centre, The Cullinan
U4	Tung Chung line concourse	Exit, Elements mall
U3	Airport Express concourse	Exit, Elements mall
U3	Tung Chung line concourse	Exit, Elements mall, escalator to U5
G	Airport Express check-in	Customer service, drop-off area, in-town check-in, left luggage
G	Airport Express check-in	MTRshops, vending machines, toilets, police post
G	Tung Chung line concourse	Exits, customer service, car park, toilet
G	Tung Chung line concourse	Airport Express shuttle bus, public transport interchange
G	Tung Chung line concourse	MTRshops, Hang Seng Bank, automatic teller machines
L2; Platforms	Airport Express concourse	Customer service, drop-off area, toilets
L2; Platforms	Side platform, doors will open on the left
L2; Platforms	Platform 1	Airport Express towards AsiaWorld–Expo (Olympic) →
L2; Platforms	Platform 2	← Airport Express towards Hong Kong (Terminus)
L2; Platforms	Side platform, doors will open on the left
L2; Platforms	Airport Express concourse	Customer service, taxi stand, MTRshops, toilets
L3	Confined space	Reserved for East Kowloon line
L4; Platforms	Platform 3	Tung Chung line towards Tung Chung (Olympic) →
L4; Platforms	Island platform, doors will open on the right
L4; Platforms	Platform 4	← Tung Chung line towards Hong Kong (Terminus)
L5	Confined space	Reserved for East Kowloon line

== Entrances and exits ==
Tung Chung line Concourse (G)

- A - Station Car Park
- B - Airport Express Shuttle Bus
- C and D - Elements mall(ELEMENTS)
  - C1 - High Speed Rail, Hong Kong West Kowloon Station, Tuen Ma Line, Austin Station, Public transport interchange, Cross Boundary Coach Terminus, Elements, International Commerce Centre(ICC), International Gateway Centre(IGC), ONE IGC, Ping An Tower, THREE IGC, UBS Tower, Xiqu Centre, Kwun Chung Spotrs Centre, Kowloon Park, Kowloon Park Sports Centre
  - C2 - Sorrento, The Arch, The Harbourside, The Waterfront
  - D1 - Elements mall
  - D2 - Sorrento, International Commerce Centre, The Arch, The Harbourside, The Waterfront

Airport Express In-town Check In (G)

- E1-E5 - West Kowloon Cultural District, West Kowloon Waterfront Promenade, Western Harbour Crossing bus stops

== Gallery ==
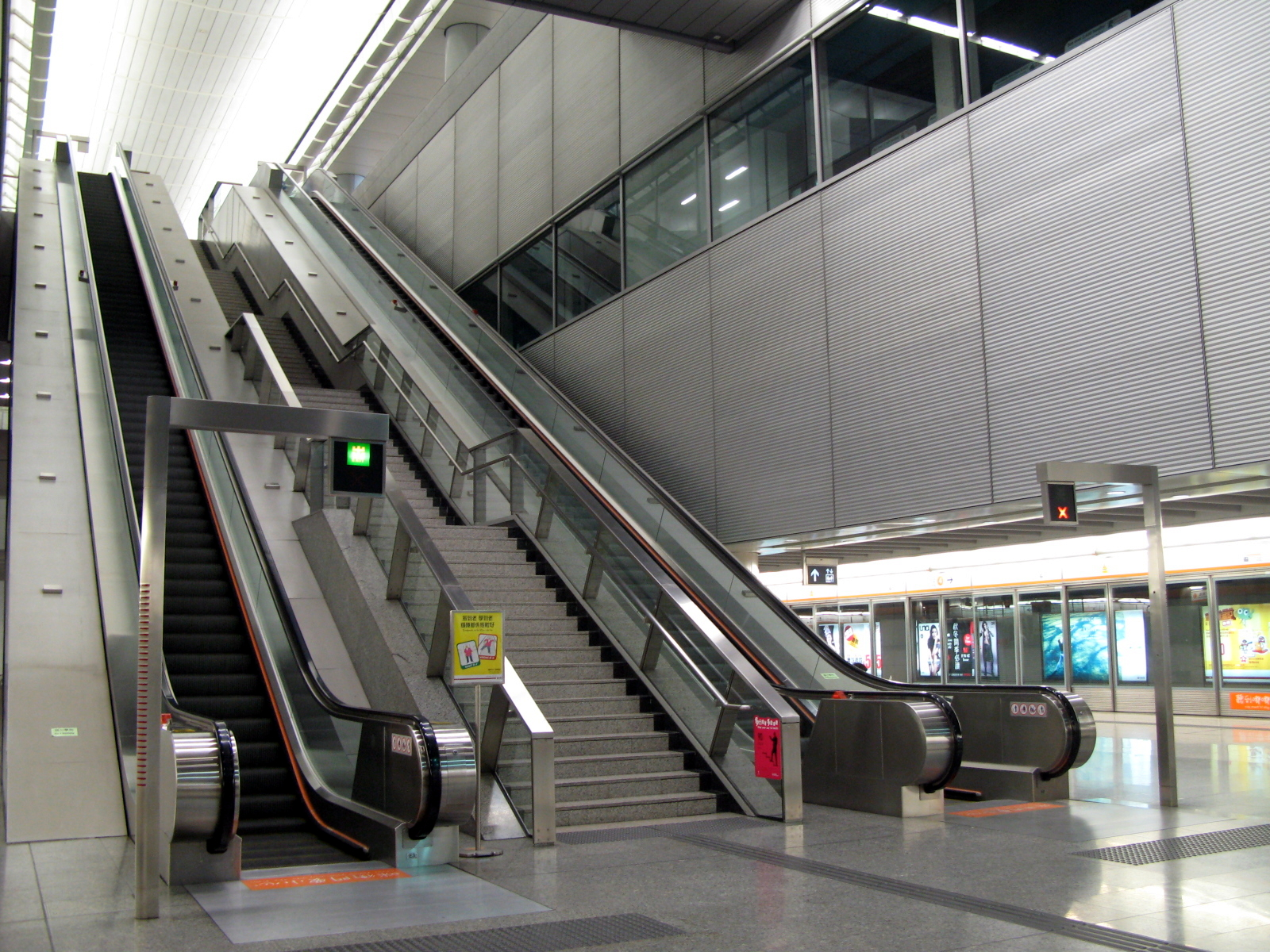
The long escalator

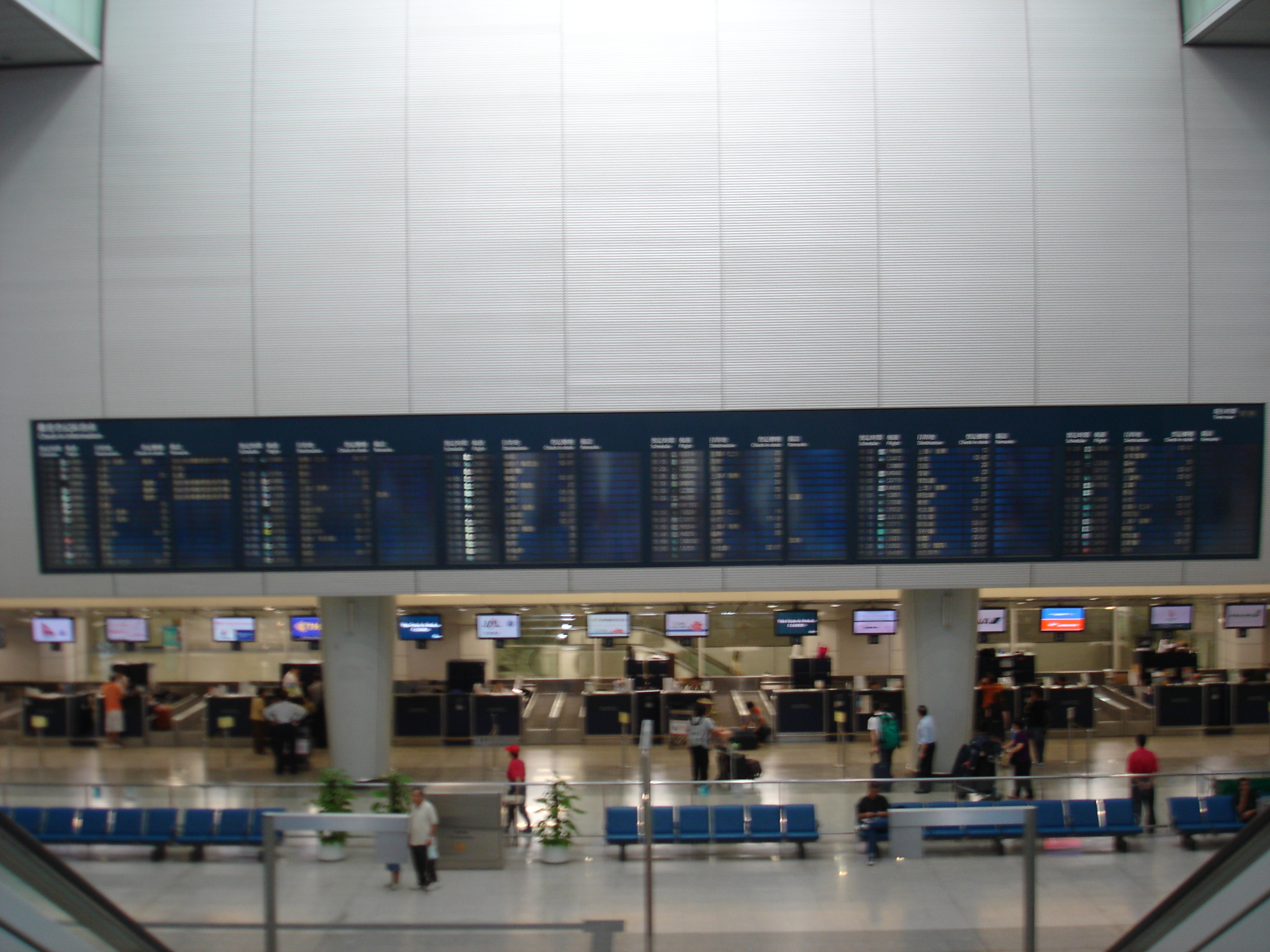
Airport Express check-in desk, from Elements

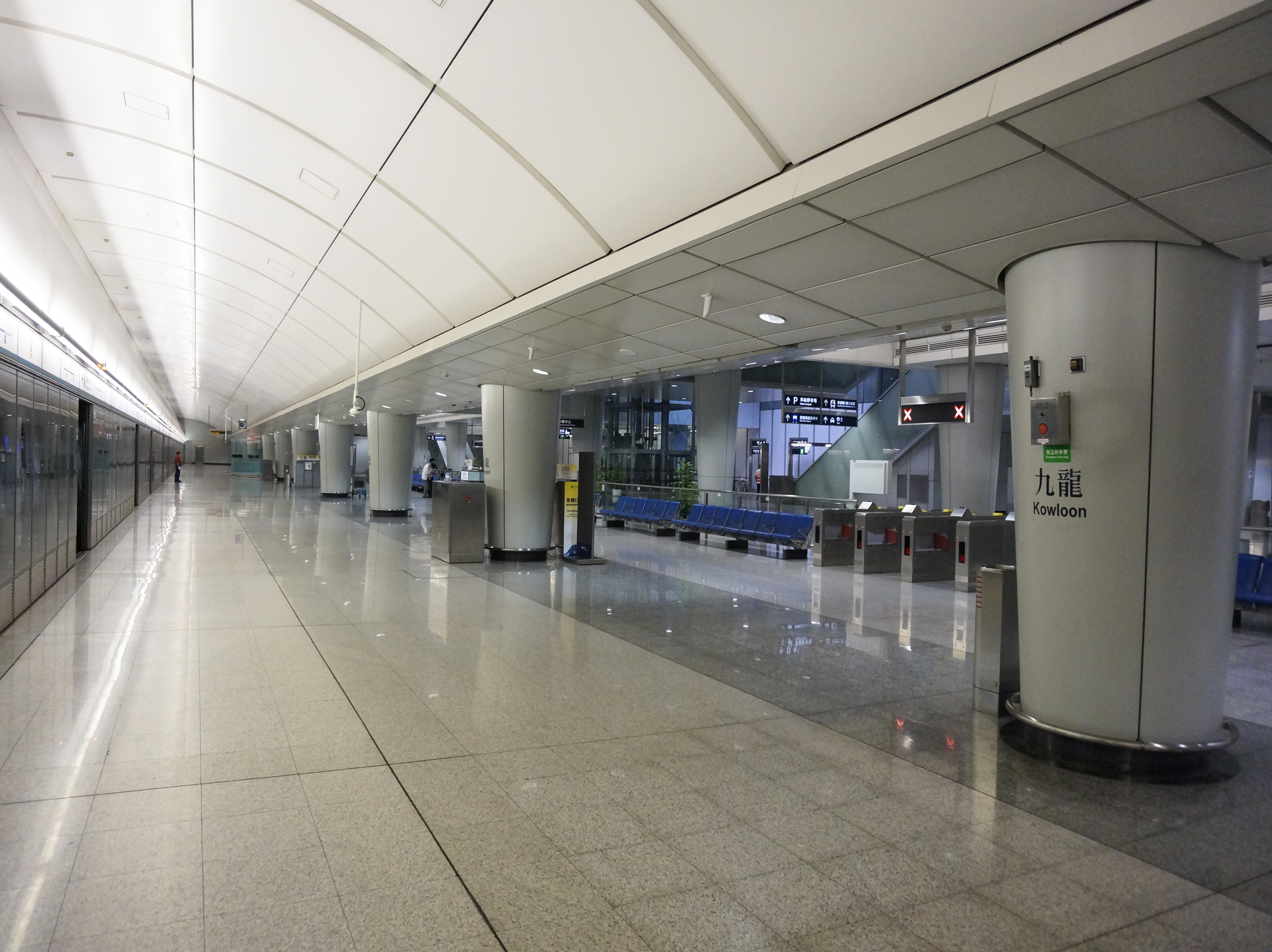
Platform 1 (Airport Express)

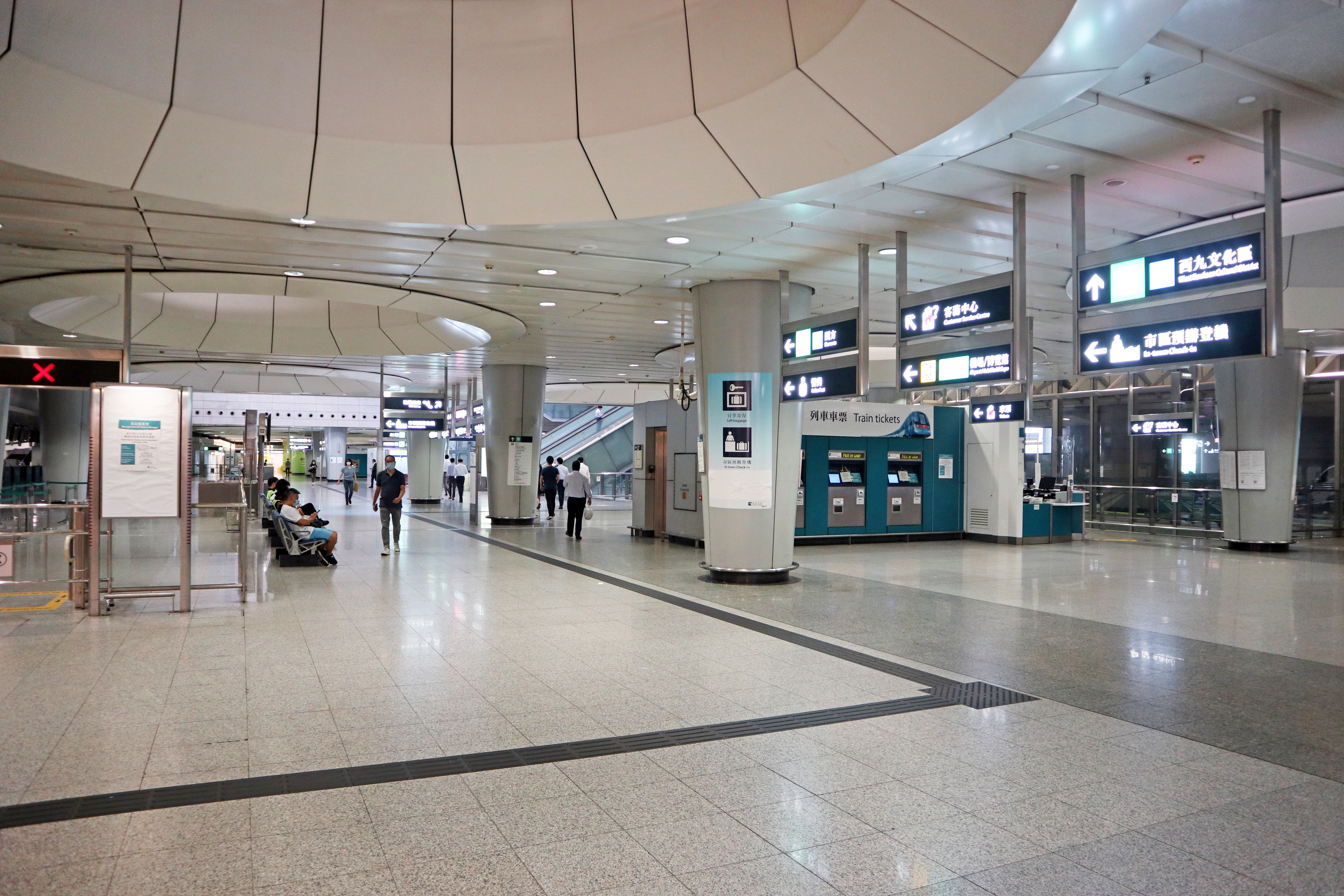
Airport Express Check-in Concourse

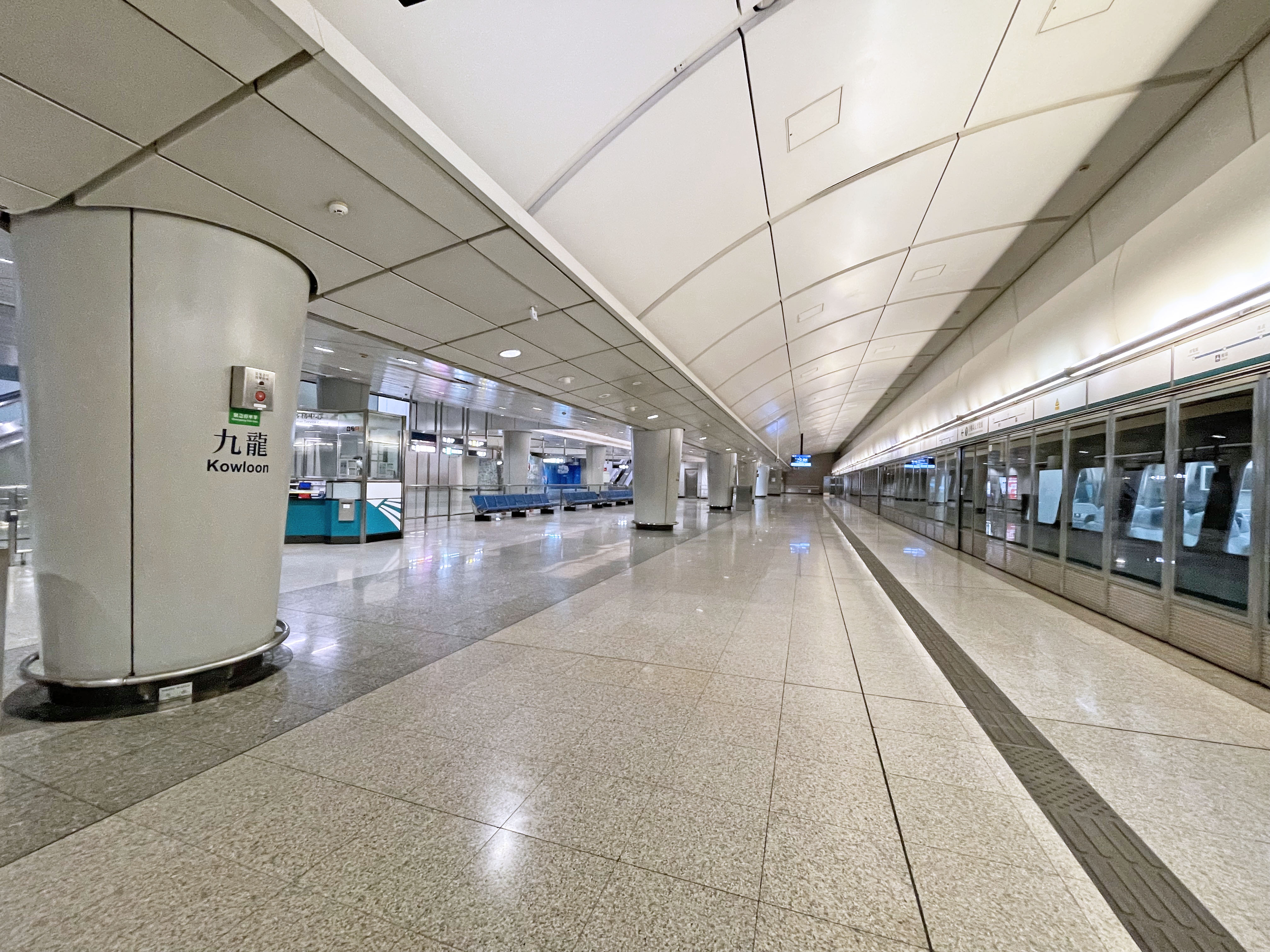
Platform 1 (Airport Express)

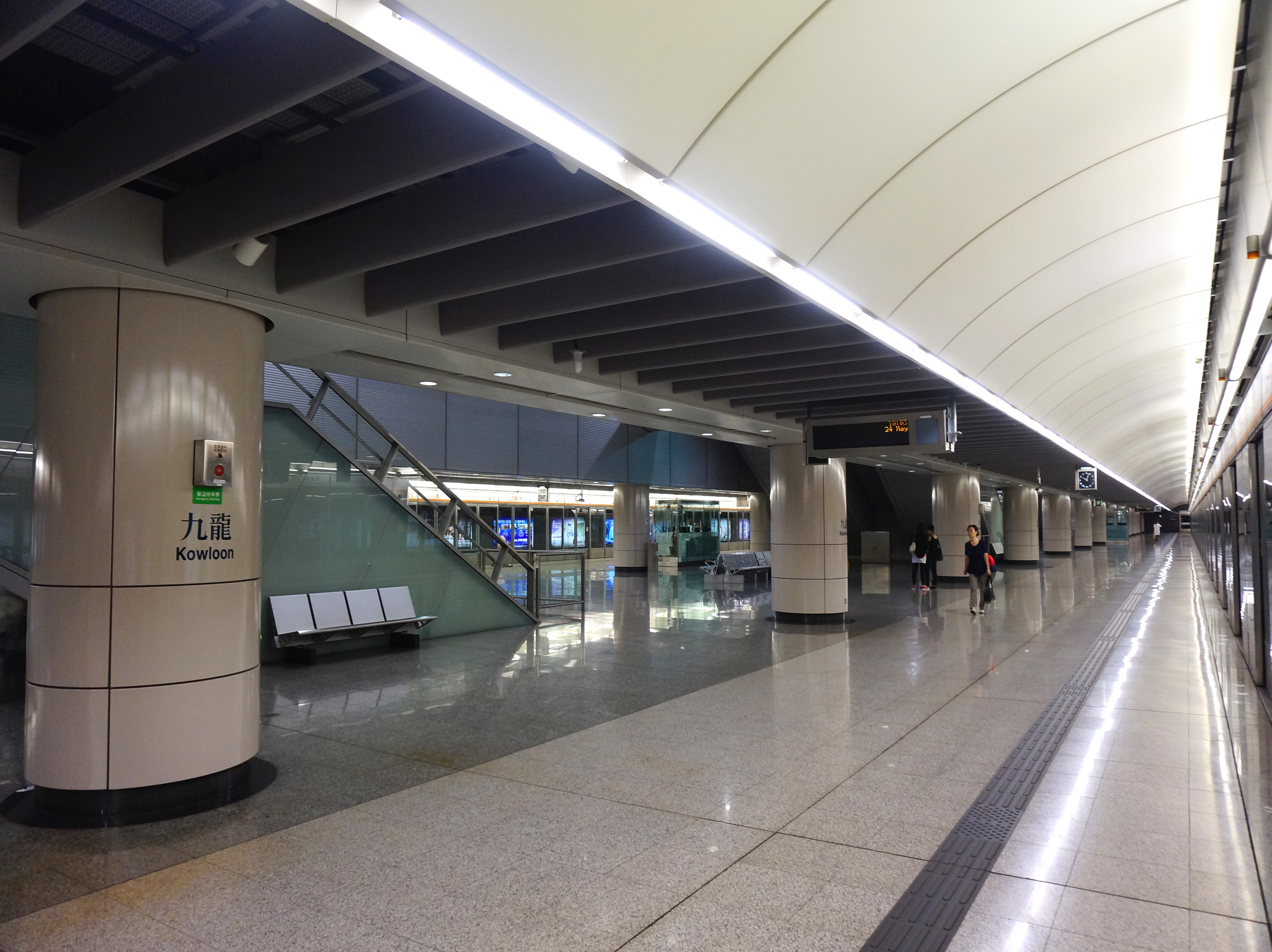
Platform 3 (Tung Chung line)

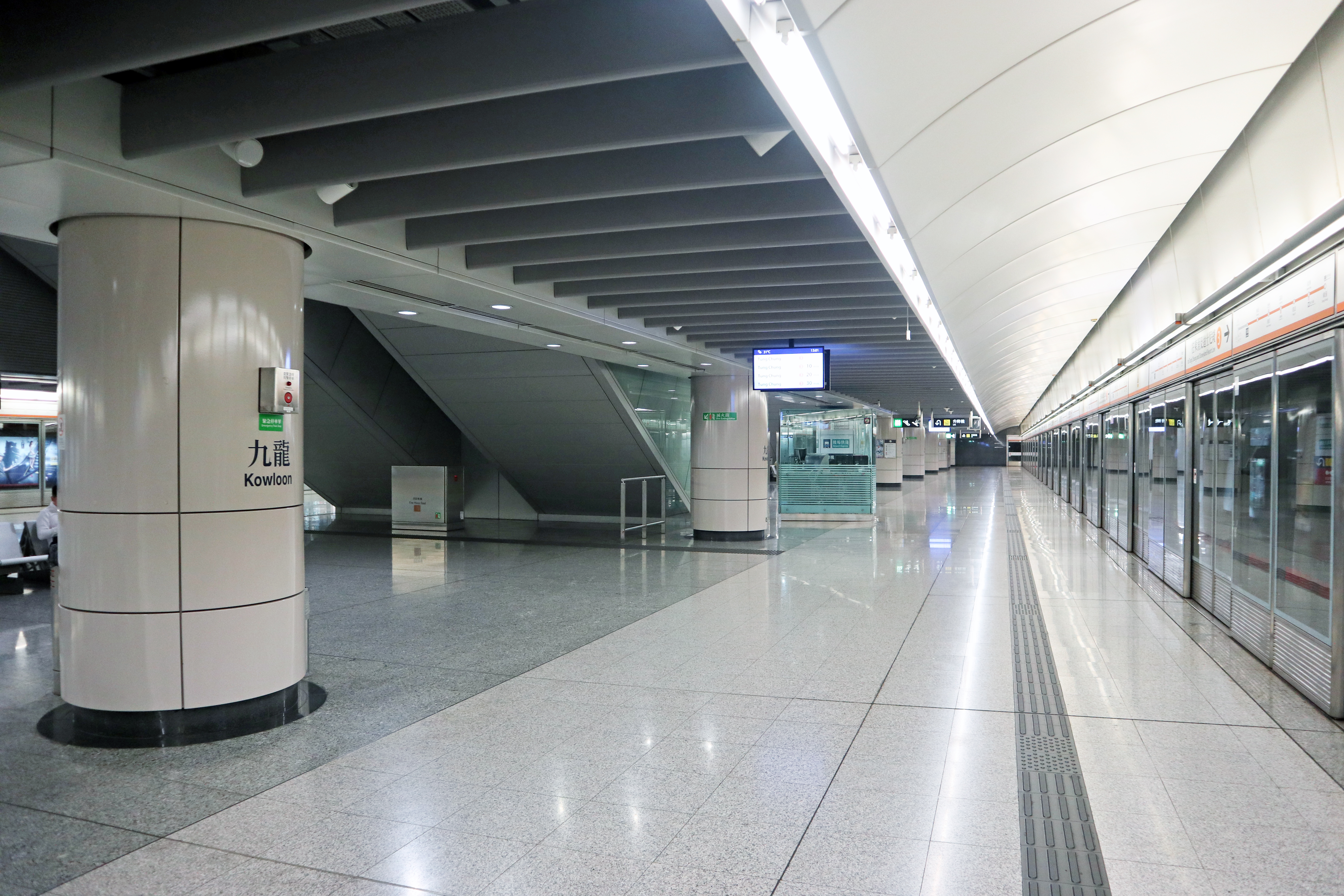
Platform 3 (Tung Chung Line)

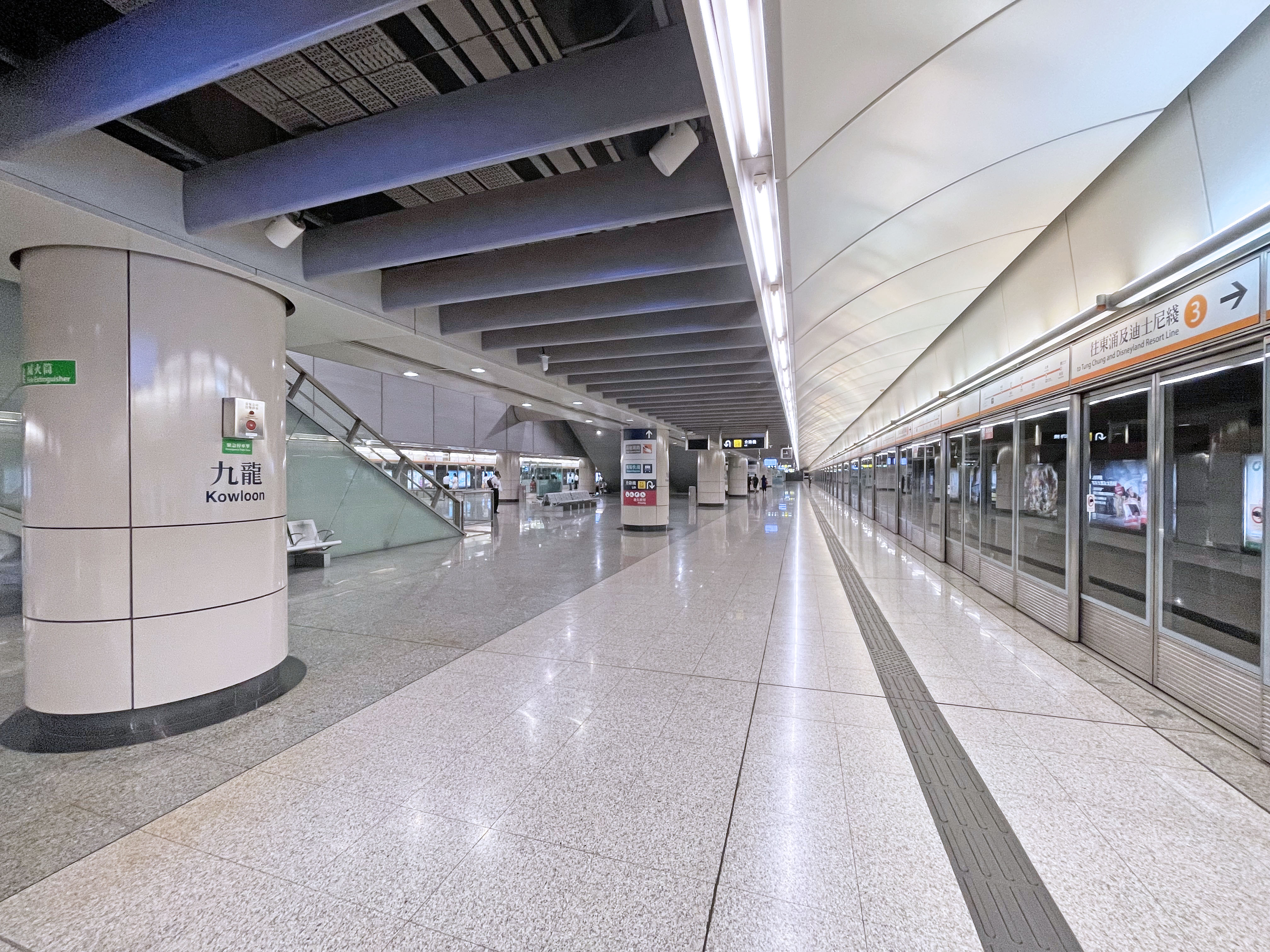
Platform 3 (Tung Chung Line)
