= Octophobia =

Fear of the number 8

- People with octophobia will avoid going to houses with the house number 8
- Specialty: Psychology

Octophobia (ancient Greek word ὀκτώ (oktō) meaning eight (8) and φόβος (phobos) meaning fear) is the irrational fear of the number 8, or the symbol 8. People with octophobia will fear the symbol of the number 8 since it resembles the looping, infinite shape of the digit of infinity which this may also be related to apeirophobia, the fear of infinity. People will avoid going to houses that have the street address 8 or avoid looking at calendars since they have the number 8, or a month like August which is the 8th month each year.

== Causes ==
Octophobia is generally caused by traumatic experiences on the 8th, such as severe injuries or other events on that date. Family history is prone for octophobies to be afraid of the number 8 from anxiety disorders and other specific phobias.

== Symptoms ==
Although the number eight is a harmless number and symbol, people with octophobia may have panic attacks, anxiety, and nausea. They may also experience a fight-or-flight response to the number.

== Treatment ==
Octophobia can be treated by cognitive behavioural therapy (CBT) and exposure therapy as well as relaxation techniques.

== See also ==
- Tetraphobia - the fear of the number 4.
- Triskaidekaphobia - the fear of the number 13.
- Heptadecaphobia - fear of the number 17
- List of phobias, including Numerophobia
