= Numerophobia =

Fear of numbers or mathematics

- Other names: Math anxiety
- Specialty: Psychiatry

Numerophobia, arithmophobia, or mathematics anxiety is an anxiety disorder, involving fear of dealing with numbers or mathematics. Sometimes numerophobia refers to fear of particular numbers. Some people with this condition may be afraid of even numbers, odd numbers, unlucky numbers, and/or lucky numbers. Those with this phobia may have a hard time holding certain jobs, paying bills, or managing a budget.

== Types ==
There are two types of arithmophobia: generalized arithmophobia and fear of specific numbers. Generalized arithmophobia is a fear of all numbers. Fear of specific numbers can be associated with cultural and religious factors. For example, 666 are 3 numbers combined that represent the antichrist in the bible. In China, Vietnam, and Japan, 4 is a number that represents death. In many cultures the number 13 is also an unlucky number which people fear. These fears in numbers make it difficult for people to perform well in professional and educational settings.

=== Fears of specific numbers ===
- Tetraphobia – fear of 4 (four)
- Octophobia – fear of 8 (eight)
- Triskaidekaphobia – fear of 13 (thirteen)
- Heptadecaphobia – fear of 17 (seventeen)
- 23 enigma (eikositriophobia) – fear of 23 (twenty-three)
- Curse of 39 (triakontenneaphobia) – fear of 39 (thirty-nine)
- Hexakosioihexekontahexaphobia – fear of 666 (six hundred sixty-six)

=== Fear of large numbers ===
Meganumerophobia is the fear of large numbers, like millions, billions, trillions, etc. Meganumerophobes do not fear lower, more imaginable numbers. To some sufferers, high numbers represent eternity. Sufferers of apeirophobia may fear meganumerophobia as well.

=== Number-related superstitions in music ===
- Curse of the ninth
- 27 Club

== Symptoms ==
Symptoms of arithmophobia are similar to other types of anxiety disorder. These symptoms include chills, dizziness and lightheadedness, excessive sweating, heart palpitations, nausea, shortness of breath, trembling or shaking, and an upset stomach. Symptoms of arithmophobia can be more or less intense in different cases.

== Treatment ==
One common treatment for anxiety disorders is exposure therapy, in which the patient is carefully exposed to the fear object in a controlled environment to help them understand that the object is not harmful. Other common treatments include cognitive behavioral therapy, which is talking to a therapist, hypnotherapy, which is guided concentration and relaxation, and medication to reduce anxiety.
