= Storey =

Part of a building

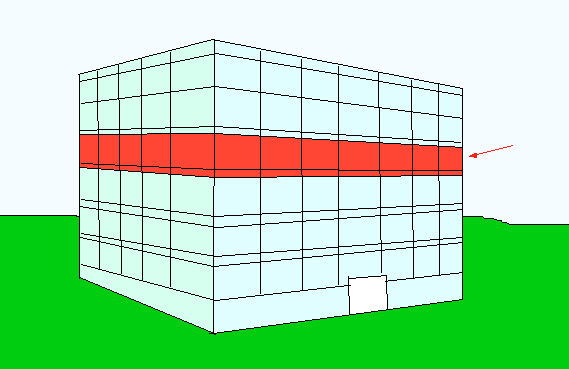
A storey plan (the red floor would be the 5th in North American convention, or 4th in the European convention)

A storey (Commonwealth English) or story (American English), is any level part of a building with a floor that could be used by people (for living, work, storage, recreation, etc.). Plurals for the word are storeys (UK, CAN) and stories (US).

The terms floor, level, or deck are used in similar ways as storey (e.g., "the 16th floor", "double-decker"). However, when referring to an entire building, it is more usual to use storey or story (e.g., "a 16-storey building"). The floor at ground or street level is called the ground floor (i.e. it needs no number); the floor below ground is called basement, and the floor above ground is called "first" in many regions. However, in some regions, like the US, ground floor is synonymous with first floor, leading to differing numberings of floors, depending on region – even between different national varieties of English.

The words storey and floor normally exclude levels of the building that are not covered by a roof, such as the terrace on the rooftops of many buildings. Nevertheless, a flat roof on a building is counted as a floor in other languages, for instance dakvloer in Dutch, literally "roof-floor", simply counted one level up from the floor number that it covers.

A two-storey house or home extension is sometimes referred to as double-storey in the UK, while one storey is referred to as single-storey.

== Overview ==
Houses commonly have only one or two floors, although three- and four-storey houses also exist. Buildings are often classified as low-rise, mid-rise and high-rise according to how many levels they contain, but these categories are not well-defined. A single-storey house is often referred to, particularly in the United Kingdom, as a bungalow. The tallest skyscraper in the world, the Burj Khalifa, also has the greatest number of storeys with 163.

The height of each storey is based on the ceiling height of the rooms plus the thickness of the floors between each pane. Generally this is around 3.0 m (10 ft) total; however, it varies widely from just under this figure to well over it. Storeys within a building need not be all the same height—often the lobby is taller, for example. One review of tall buildings suggests that residential towers may have 3.1 m (10 ft 2 in) floor height for apartments, while a commercial building may have floor height of 3.9 m (12 ft 9.5 in) for the storeys leased to tenants. In such tall buildings (60 or more storeys), there may be utility floors of greater height.

Additionally, higher levels may have less floor area than the ones beneath them (e.g., the Willis Tower).

In English the principal floor or main floor of a house is the floor that contains the chief apartments; it is usually the ground floor, or the floor above. In Italy the main floor of a home was traditionally above the ground level and was called the piano nobile ("noble floor").

The attic or loft is a storey just below the roof of the building; its ceiling is often pitched and/or at a different height from that of other floors. A penthouse is a luxury apartment on the topmost storey of a building. A basement is a storey below the main or ground floor; the first (or only) basement of a home is also called the lower ground floor.

Split-level homes have floors that are offset from each other by less than the height of a full storey. A mezzanine, in particular, is typically a floor halfway between two floors.

== Numbering ==
Countries numbering floor system European scheme North American scheme Both schemes No data

Floor numbering is the numbering scheme used for a building's floors. There are two major schemes in use across the world. In the first system, used in such countries as the United States, Canada, China, Finland, Japan, Norway, Russia, and other ex-Soviet states, the number of floors is counted literally; that is, when one enters a building through the ground-level front door, one walks quite literally on the first floor; the storey above it therefore counts as the second floor. In the other system, used in the majority of European countries, floor at ground level is called the "ground floor", if numbered having 0 as number; the next floor up is assigned the number 1 and is named the first floor (first elevation), the first basement level gets −1, and so on. In both systems, the numbering of higher floors continues sequentially as one goes up, as shown in the following table:

=== Consecutive number floor designations ===
Common floor designations (Note: Does not account for superstitions like triskaidekaphobia or tetraphobia.)
Height relative to ground (storeys)	Common in Europe	Common in North America
Top floor	Penthouse (PH), Roof (R/RF), nth floor	
3 levels above ground storey	3rd floor (3/3F)	4th floor (4/4F)
2 levels above ground storey	2nd floor (2/2F)	3rd floor (3/3F)
1 level above ground storey	1st floor (1/1F)	2nd floor (2/2F)
Partially above ground storey	Upper ground (UG), Upper level (UL), Mezzanine (M), etc.	
Ground storey	Ground floor (G/GF), Lobby (L), Street (S) (Note: Elevators may designate the ground floor with a ☆ (like ☆0, ☆1, ☆L, ☆G, etc., most commonly found in North America) or a green ring (most commonly found in Europe).)	
Ground storey	Ground floor or 0 (0/0F)	1st floor (1/1F)
Partially below ground storey	Lower ground (LG), Lower level (LL), Concourse (C), Parking (P), Semi-basement, etc.	
1 level below ground storey	1st basement (−1/−1F/B1)	
2 levels below ground storey	2nd basement, Sub-basement (−2/−2F/B2)	
3 levels below ground storey	3rd basement, Sub-sub-basement (−3/−3F/B3)	

Each scheme has further variations depending on how one refers to the ground floor and the subterranean levels. The existence of two incompatible conventions is a common source of confusion in international communication.

However, in all English-speaking countries, the storeys in a building are counted in the same way: a "seven-storey building" is unambiguous, although the top floor would be called "6th floor" in Britain and "7th floor" in America. This contrasts, for example, with French usage, where a 7-storey building is called une maison à 6 (six) étages. Mezzanines may or may not be counted as storeys.

=== European scheme ===
==== Floor at ground level ====
This convention can be traced back to Medieval European usage. In countries that use this system, the floor at ground level is usually referred to by a special name, usually translating as "ground floor" or equivalent. For example, Erdgeschoss ("ground floor") in Germany (sometimes however, Parterre, adopted from French), piano terra or pianterreno (lit. 'ground floor') in Italy, begane grond (lit. 'trodden ground') in the Netherlands, planta baja (Castilian) or planta baixa (Catalan) in Spain (both meaning "bottom floor"), beheko solairua in Basque, andar térreo ("ground floor") in Brazil, rés-do-chão ("adjacent to the ground") in Portugal, földszint ("ground level") in Hungary (although in Budapest the félemelet ("half floor", i.e. mezzanine) is an extra level between the ground and first floors, apparently a circumevention of construction regulations of the 19th and early 20th centuries), rez-de-chaussée (from French street level, where rez is the old French of ras ("scraped"), chaussée ("street").) in France, parter in Poland and Romania, prízemie ("by the ground") in Slovakia, and pritličje ("close to the ground") in Slovenia. In some countries that use this scheme, the higher floors may be explicitly qualified as being above the ground level, such as in Slovenian prvo nadstropje (literally "first floor above ceiling (of the ground storey)").

==== First elevation, Europe, Latin America ====
In many countries in Europe, the second storey is called the "first floor", for being the first elevation. Besides Europe, this scheme is mostly used in some large Latin American countries (including Mexico, Argentina, Brazil, Paraguay, and Uruguay), and British Commonwealth nations (except Singapore and Canada).

==== First elevation, Spain ====
In Spain, the level above ground level (the mezzanine) is sometimes called entresuelo (entresòl in Catalan, etc., which literally means "interfloor"), and elevators may skip it. When the next level is different from the others, usually with higher ceiling and better decorations, then it is called principal (main floor). This is because before elevators the apartments in the floor that required less stairs to reach was the most expensive and usually also the most luxurious one. In those cases the "first floor" can therefore be two or three levels above ground level.

==== First elevation, Italy ====
In Italy, in the ancient palaces the first floor is called piano nobile ("noble floor"), since the noble owners of the palace lived there.

==== First elevation, France ====
In France, there are two distinct names for storeys at ground level, depending on whether it faces the street (called rez-de-chaussée,) or a garden (called rez-de-jardin). Buildings which have two "ground floors" at different levels (on two opposite faces, usually) might have both.

==== First elevation, Croatia ====
The same differentiation is used as well in some buildings in Croatia. The lower level is called razizemlje (abbr. RA), and the upper prizemlje (PR). If there is only one ground floor, it is called prizemlje. The latter usage is standard for smaller buildings, such as single-family homes.

=== North American schemes ===
In the United States, the first floor and ground floor are usually equivalent, being at ground level, and may also be called the "lobby" or "main floor" to indicate the entrance to the building. The storey just above it is the second floor, and so on. The English-speaking parts of Canada generally follow the American convention, although Canada has kept the Commonwealth spelling "storey". In Quebec, the European scheme was formerly used (as in France), but by now it has been mostly replaced by the US system, so that rez-de-chaussée and premier étage ("first stage") are now generally equivalent in Quebec. Mexico, on the other hand, uses the European system.

The North American scheme is used in Finland, Norway, and Iceland. The Icelandic term jarðhæð ("ground floor") refers to the floor at ground level.

=== Latin America ===
European scheme: In many Latin American countries (including Argentina, Mexico, Paraguay, Uruguay and Venezuela) the ground floor is called planta baja and the next floor is primer piso. In Brazil the ground floor is called térreo and the next floor is primeiro andar.

In other countries, including Chile, Colombia, Ecuador and Peru, the ground floor is called primer piso (first floor). If planta baja is ever used it means the ground-level floor (although primer piso is used mainly for indoor areas, while planta baja is also used for areas outside the building).

=== East and Southeast Asian schemes ===
Most parts of East and Southeast Asia—including China (except for Hong Kong), Japan, Korea, and Singapore—follow the American system. Indonesia uses both the American and European systems. In the grammar of the respective languages, the numbers precede the word "floor", and are cardinals rather than ordinals, so they would translate literally as "1 floor (1F), 2 floor (2F)" (etc.), rather than "1st floor, 2nd floor", or "floor 1, floor 2".

==== Singapore ====
In Singapore, the British system of numbering originally prevailed. This was replaced in March 1983 with the North American scheme to create a simplified and consistent standard of numbering storeys. To emphasise the difference from the original scheme, reference is frequently made to storeys rather than floors, where the third (3rd) floor becomes either the fourth (4th) storey/level (storey/level 4). Many buildings continue to label storeys or levels rather than floors. However, in the absence of clear official distinction between the terms, the meaning of "floors" and "levels" have become interchangeable with "storey"; this is reflected in newer buildings. Some buildings in Singapore do use SL (Street Level) for ground level, while others such as Nex and West Coast Plaza uses the European scheme, albeit using "Basement 1" for ground level storey.

==== Vietnam ====
Vietnam uses both the North American and European schemes, generally depending on the region. In northern and central Vietnam, including the capital Hanoi, tầng refers to any floor, including the ground floor, which is called tầng 1. Meanwhile, in southern Vietnam, trệt refers to the ground floor and lầu refers to any floor above it, starting at lầu 1 directly above the ground floor.

A national standard, TCVN 6003-1:2012 (ISO 4157-1:1998), requires architectural drawings to follow the northern scheme. It also refers to a crawl space as tầng 0. However, a given building's floor designations are unregulated. Thus, some apartment buildings in the largest city, Ho Chi Minh City, have posted floor numbers according to the northern scheme, while others label the ground floor as "G" or the thirteenth floor as "12 bis".

Comparison of floor numbering systems in Vietnam
Northern Vietnam	Southern Vietnam	Meaning
Hầm	Hầm	Basement
Tầng 1	Trệt	Ground floor
Tầng 2	Lầu 1	
Tầng 3	Lầu 2	
...

=== Idiosyncrasies ===
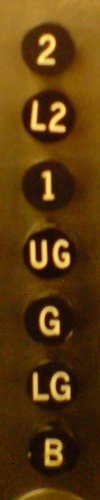
Unusual floor numbering that reads B (basement floor), LG (lower ground floor), G, (ground floor), UG (upper ground floor), 1 (first floor), L2 (lower 2nd floor) and 2 (second floor).

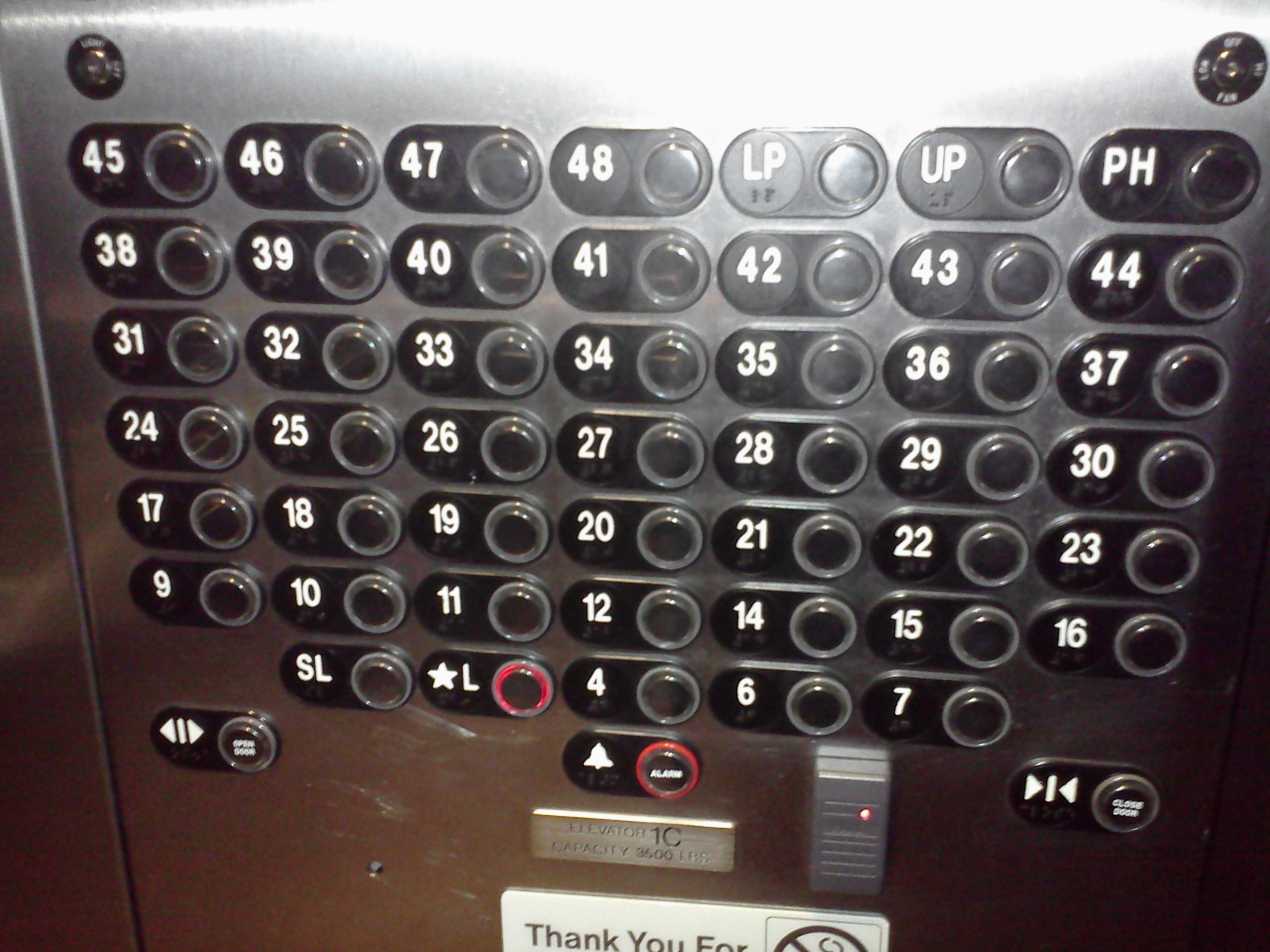
A large elevator panel in a North American high-rise omits several floors as well as designating three separate levels as penthouse floors.

An extremely small number of American high-rise buildings follow the British/European system, often out of a desire on the part of the building's architect or owners.

An arrangement often found in high rise public housing blocks, particularly those built in the United Kingdom during the 1960s and 1970s, is that elevators would only call at half the total number of floors, or at an intermediate level between a pair of floors; for example an elevator of a 24-storey building would only stop at 12 levels, with staircases used to access the "upper" or "lower" level from each intermediate landing. This halves any building costs associated with elevator shaft doors. Where the total traffic necessitates a second elevator the alternate floors strategy is sometimes still applied, not only for the doorway reduction but also, provisionally upon the passengers preferring no particular floor beyond capacity, it tends toward halving the total delay imposed by the stops en route. Sometimes, two elevators are divided so that all floors are served, but one elevator only serves odd floors and the other even, which would often be less efficient for passengers, but cheaper to install because the group control of elevators was more complex than single control.

A few buildings in the United States and Canada have both a "first floor" (usually the main floor of the building) and a "ground floor" below it. This typically happens when both floors have street-level entrances, as is often the case for hillside buildings with walkout basements. In the UK, the lower of these floors would be called the "lower ground floor", while the upper would be called either the "upper ground floor" or simply the "ground floor". Multi-storey car parks which have a staggered arrangement of parking levels sometimes use a convention where there may be an "upper" and "lower" level of the same floor number, (e.g.: "1U/U1" = Upper 1st, "2L/L2" = "Lower 2nd" and so on), although the elevators will typically only serve one of the two levels, or the elevator lobby for each floor pair may be between the two levels.

In 19th-century London, many buildings were built with the main entrance floor a metre above ground, and the floor below that being two metres below ground. This was done partly for aesthetics, and partly to allow access between the lower level and the street without going through the main floor. In this situation, the lower level is called Lower Ground, the main floor is called Upper Ground, and floors above it are numbered serially from 1.

Sometimes, such as at the Westin Peachtree Plaza, floor number 1 may be the lowest basement level; in that case the ground floor may be numbered 2 or higher, in that case, floors 4, 5, and 6 can all be considered the ground floor. In contrast, a few buildings such as the Atlanta Marriott Marquis have multiple floors above ground and then have a floor 1. In that case, the lowest above ground floors are IL (International Level), ML (Marquis Level), LL (Lobby Level), and AL (Atrium Level) before floor 1. Sometimes two connected buildings (such as a store and its car park) have incongruent floor numberings, due to sloping terrain or different ceiling heights. To avoid this, shopping centers may call the main floors by names such as Upper Mall, Lower Mall, Lower Ground, with the parking floors being numbered Pn.

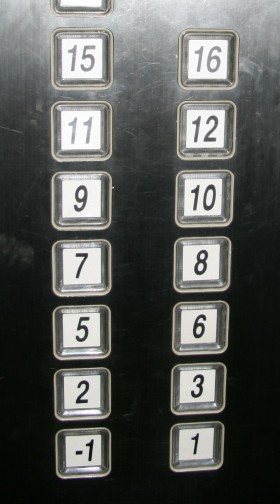
An elevator control panel in an apartment building in Shanghai. Floors 4, 13 and 14 are missing.

In some instances, buildings may omit the thirteenth floor in their floor numbering because of triskaidekaphobia, a common superstition surrounding this number. The floor numbering may either go straight from 12 to 14, or the floor may be given an alternative name such as "Skyline" or "14A". Due to a similar superstition in east Asia, some mainland Chinese, Taiwanese, and Indonesian buildings (typically high-rises) omit or skip the 4th floor along with other floor numbers ending in 4 such as 14 and 24. The floor above the third would be numbered as the fifth, and so on. This is because of tetraphobia: in many varieties of Chinese, the pronunciation of the word for "four" is very similar to the pronunciation of the word for "to die". Through Chinese cultural and linguistic influence, tetraphobia is common in many countries of East Asia. For this reason, apartments on the 4th floor in Asian countries such as Taiwan have traditionally been cheaper to rent.

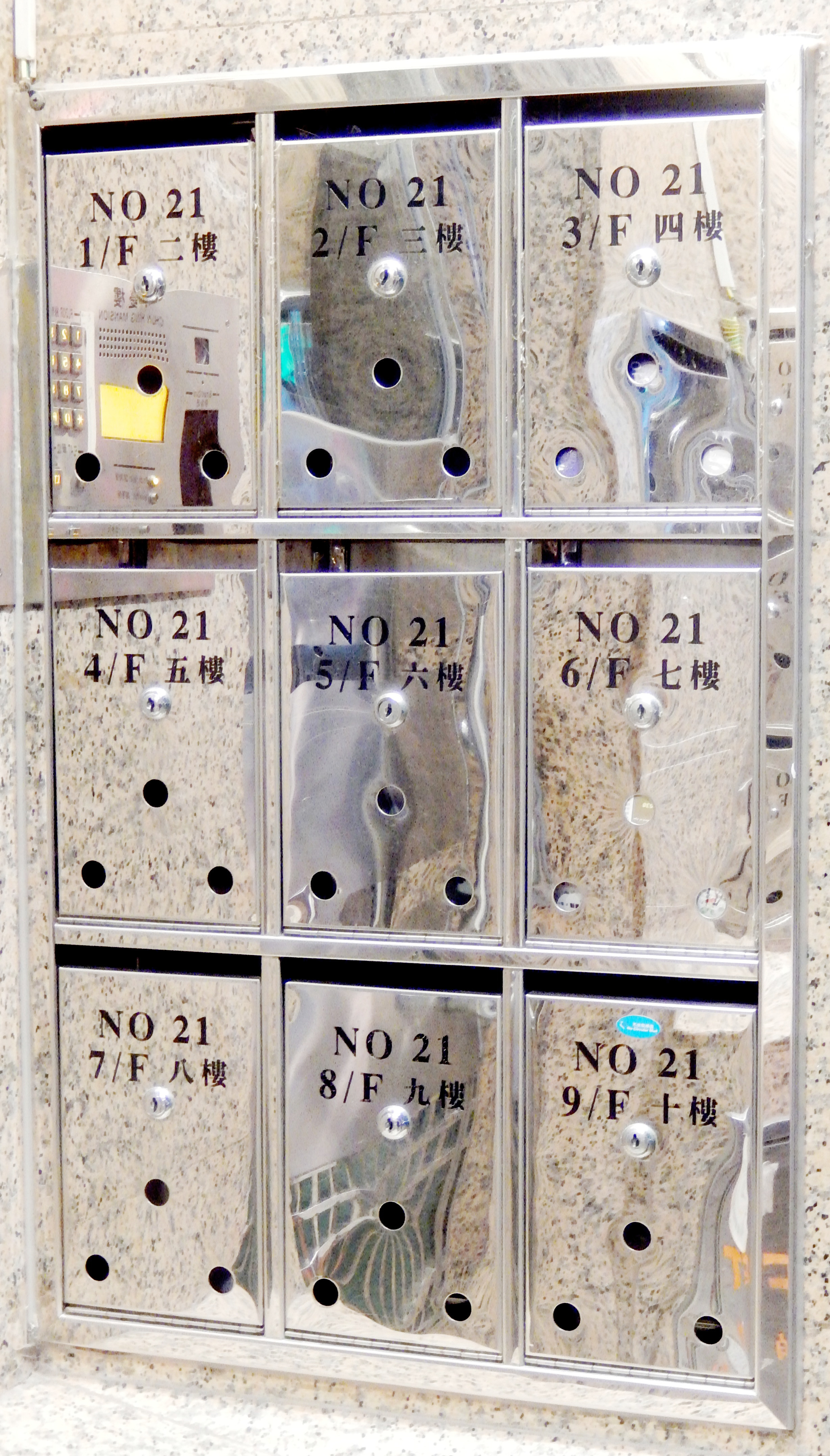
Letter boxes of a residential building built in the 1970s in Hong Kong. The Chinese and English floor numberings use the traditional Chinese and the British systems, respectively, resulting in different numbers.

In Hong Kong, the British numbering system is now generally used, in English and Chinese alike. In some older residential buildings, however, the floors are identified by signs in Chinese characters that say "二樓" ("2 floor") at the floor just above ground, as in the North American system. For those buildings, the Chinese phrase "三樓" or its English equivalent "3rd floor" may refer either to the storey three levels above ground (as in the modern numbering), which is actually labelled "四樓" ("4 floor"), or to the storey with the sign "三樓" ("3 floor"), which is only two levels above ground. This confusing state of affairs has led, for example, to numerous errors in utility billing. To avoid ambiguity, business forms often ask that storey numbers in address fields be written as accessed from an elevator. In colloquial speeches, the character "唐" may be added before the number to emphasise it refers to the Chinese style of numbering, e.g. "唐三樓" (literally "Chinese 3 floor"), or the character "字" added after the number to refer to the British style of numbering as shown in an elevator, e.g. 2字樓 (literally "2 digit floor", floor with number 2), while in writing in Chinese, Chinese numerals are used for Chinese style numbering, and Arabic numerals are used for British style numbering.

In Hawaii, the Hawaiian-language floor label uses the British system, but the English-language floor label uses the American system. For example, Papa akolu (P3) is equivalent to Level 4 (4 or L4).

In Greenland, the Greenlandic-language floor label uses the American system, but the Danish-language floor label uses the British system. Plan pingasut (P3) is equivalent to Level 2 (Plan to or P2).

== Elevator buttons ==
In most of the world, elevator buttons for storeys above the ground level are usually marked with the corresponding numbers. In many countries, modern elevators also have Braille numbers—often mandated by law.

=== European scheme ===
In countries using the European system, the ground floor is either marked 0, or with the initial letter of the local word for ground floor (G, E, etc.), successive floors are then marked 1, 2, etc. However, even when the ground floor button is marked with a letter, some digital position indicators may show 0 when the elevator is on that floor. If the building also contains floors below ground, negative numbers are common. This then gives a conventional numbering sequence −2, −1, 0, 1, 2, 3, ... In Spain and other countries whose official language is Spanish or Portuguese, the ground floor is usually marked PB (planta baja, planta baixa, etc.), and in buildings where these exist, the entresuelo or entresòl and principal are marked E and P, respectively. In France, floors are usually marked the same way as in Spain; however, the letters for the ground floor are RDC (rez-de-chaussée), seldom simplified to RC. This scheme is also found in some buildings in Quebec. Where these exist, there are high ground RCH (rez-de-chaussée haut) and lower ground RCB (rez-de-chaussée bas), or garden ground RJ (rez-de-jardin) and former ground RC. In Portugal, the letters corresponding to the ground floor are R/C (rés-do-chão) or simply R.

For example, in Polish language there is a clear distinction: the word parter means ground floor and piętro means a floor above the parter, usually with an ordinal: 1st piętro, 2nd piętro etc. Therefore, a parter is a zero piętro. Older elevators in Poland have a button marked P for the ground floor (parter) and S for the basement (suterena). Elevators installed since 1990 have 0 for parter and −1, −2 etc. for underground floors.

Elevators in Europe sometimes mark the entrance floor by having a green button, and/or one that protrudes further from the panel than the ones for the other floors.

=== North American scheme ===
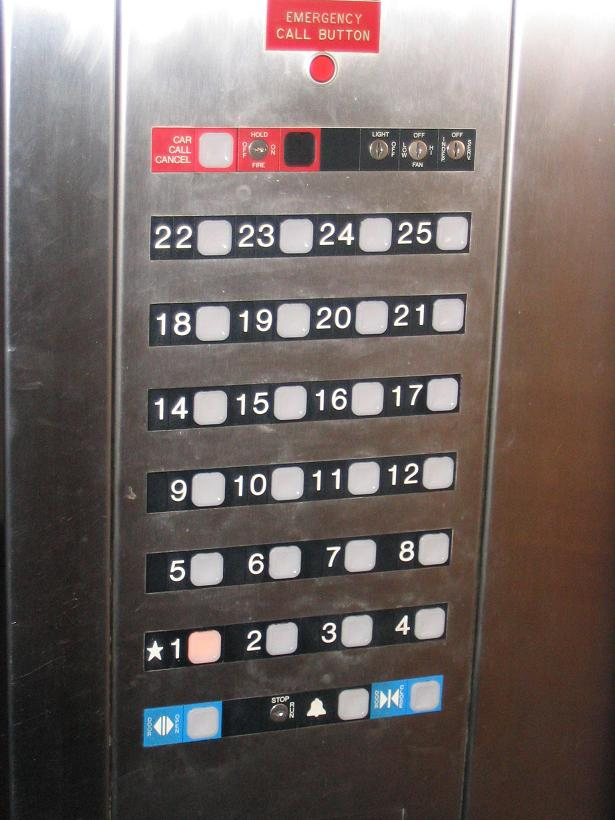
An American Dover Custom Impulse elevator control panel with floor numbering. In most buildings in the US and Canada with more than 12 floors, there is no floor numbered 13. The ☆ indicates the main entry floor.

In countries using the North American system, where "floor 1" is the same as "ground floor", the corresponding button may be marked either with 1 or with a letter, as in the European scheme. In either case, the next button will be labelled 2. In buildings that have both a "1st floor" and a "ground floor", they may be labelled 1 and G, or M (for "Main") and LM (for "Lower Main"), the latter two being more common in Canada outside Quebec. M or MZ may also be used to designate a mezzanine level, when it is not counted as a separate floor in the building's numbering scheme. If an elevator has two doors, floors on one side might end up getting an R suffix for "rear", especially if on one floor both doors open.

In modern signage, at least in North America, a five-pointed star (★) additionally appears beside the button for the main entry floor. In the United States, the five-pointed-star marking is mandated by Title III of the Americans with Disabilities Act (ADA), as described in Section 4.10.12(2) of the ADA Accessibility Guidelines for Buildings and Facilities (ADAAG). However this may be used to simply indicate a way out, such as to indicate a sky lobby. As an example, the residential elevators at the John Hancock Center all have their main floors labelled as the 44th as in order to get from a residential floor to the ground one would need to take two elevators: one from the residences to the sky lobby, and the other from the sky lobby to the ground. In the event more than one floor could be considered main floor, such as when a building has exits on more than one floor, a relatively common solution is to simply have no star and have other indications to indicate a main floor. A less commonly used solution has more than one star.

=== Subterranean and split-level floors ===
There is no particular standard convention for the numbering of levels below ground. In English-speaking countries, the first level below ground may be labelled B for "Basement", LL for "Lower Level" or "Lower Lobby", C for "Cellar", or U for "Underground". In British buildings, LG for "Lower Ground" is commonly encountered.

If there is more than one basement, either the next level down may be marked SB for "Sub-Basement" or all lower levels can be numbered B1, B2, B3, Bn. Negative numbers are sometimes used, this being more common in Europe: −1 for the first level below ground, −2 for the second one, and so on. Letters are sometimes used: A, B, C, D, E, F, G, H, I, J, etc.

There can also be split-level parking levels with the lower one having the suffix "A" and the upper having the suffix "B", like "1A", "1B", "2A", "2B", etc. Elevators in split-level buildings normally stop at either the lower or upper level, and the levels in elevators may be named just "1", "2", etc.

=== Other labels ===
Elevator buttons may also be labelled according to their main function. In English-speaking countries, besides the common L for "Lobby", one may find P for "Platform" (in train stations), "Pool" "Podium", or "Parking" (and P1, P2, P3, Pn for multiple parking floors), S for "Skyway" or "Street" (ST is also often used to indicate Street), C for "Casino" or "Concourse", R for "Restaurant" or Roof, PH for "Penthouse", OD for "observation deck", W for Walkway, T for Tunnel, Ticketing or Trains, etc. In some US buildings, the label G on the elevator may stand for the building's "Garage", which need not be located on the "Ground" floor. Sometimes GR might be used instead.

Fairmont Royal York Hotel in Toronto marks the first six floors as A, L, MM, C, H and 1 (for "Arcade", "Lobby", "Main Mezzanine", "Convention", "Health Club" and "1st floor"). The North Carolina Museum of Art, whose entrance is on the third floor up, has the floors lettered C, B, A (the main floor) and O (for "Office"). The Festival Walk mall in Hong Kong has floors labelled LG2 and LG1 ("Lower Ground 2" and "1"), G ("Ground") and UG ("Upper Ground"). In The Landmark Annex of TriNoma, DSn (n=floor) denotes the floor label of the department store area.

== Room numbering ==
In modern buildings, especially large ones, room numbers are usually tied to the floor numbers, so that one can figure out the latter from the former. Typically one uses the floor number with one or two extra digits appended to identify the room within the floor. For example, room 215 could be the 15th room of floor 2 (or 5th room of floor 21), but to avoid this confusion one dot is sometimes used to separate the floor from the room (2.15 refers to 2nd floor, 15th room and 21.5 refers to 21st floor, 5th room) or a leading zero is placed before a single-digit room number (i.e. the 5th room of floor 21 would be 2105). Letters may be used, instead of digits, to identify the room within the floor—such as 21E instead of 215. Often odd numbers are used for rooms on one side of a hallway, even numbers for rooms on the other side.

An offset may be used to accommodate unnumbered floors. For example, in a building with floors labelled G, M, 1, 2, ..., 11 and 12, the fourth room in each of those floors could be numbered 1004, 1104, 1204, 1304, ..., 2204 and 2304, respectively—with an offset of 11 in the floor numbers. This trick is sometimes used to make the floor number slightly less obvious, e.g. for security or marketing reasons.

In some buildings with numbered rooms, UK-like G, 1, ... floor numbering is used, but with rooms numbered from 200 on the "first floor" (above the ground floor), 300 on the 2nd floor, and so on (which actually resembles US-like floor numbering).

=== Iberia ===
In Spain, Portugal and Andorra the rule (official standard) is:

1. In buildings with only two corridors, all the apartments are marked as Izq. or Esq. (Izquerdo, Esquerdo or Esquerre = Left) or Dcho. or Dto. (Derecho, Direito or Dret = Right). So we have Sótano Izq., C/V Esq. or Soterrani Esq. (Underground Floor Left), Bajo Izq., R/C Esq. or Baix Esq. (Ground Floor Left), 1º. Izq., 1º. Esq. or 1er Esq. (1st Floor Left), etc.; and Sótano Dcho., C/V Dto. or Soterrani Dret (Underground Floor Right), Bajo Dcho., R/C Dto. or Baix Dret (Ground Floor Right) 1º. Dcho., 1º. Dto. or 1er Dret (1st Floor Right), etc.
2. Buildings with more than two apartments per floor, are marked with letters, clockwise within each deck. So apartment 8º-D (not 8D) means the 8th floor (hence the character "º" designating an ordinal number), apartment D (counting in clockwise direction, for those who are in the floor entrance). But a very common form for buildings with three apartments per floor is, Esq.-Frt./Fte. (Frente, en: Front – for the apartment located between left and right)-Dto.

These universal rules simplify finding an apartment in a building, particularly for blind people, who do not need to ask where a given apartment is.

== See also ==
- Deck
- Floor
- List of buildings with 100 floors or more
- Mechanical floor
- Thirteenth floor
