= Vehicle registration plates of Afghanistan =

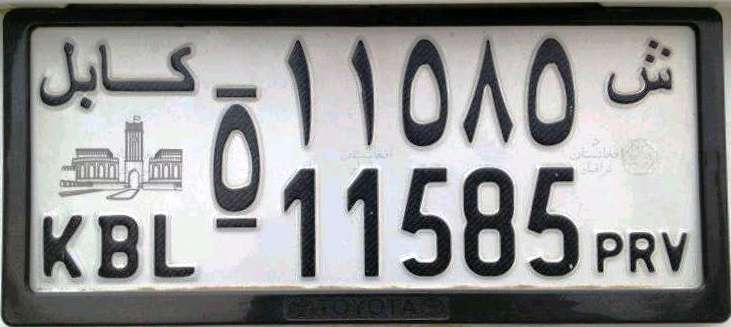
Current version from Kabul

Vehicle registration plates of Afghanistan were introduced in 1970. The current version was introduced in 2004. The dimensions of the license plates are approximately 420 mm × 175 mm (16.5 in × 6.9 in).

License plates are bilingual in Afghanistan; their general format includes the name of the province in either Persian or Pashto, with a corresponding Latin 3-letter code, a numerical code which ranges from 1 digit to 5 digits, and the class of the vehicle, identified by a Persian letter, and a corresponding Latin letter, or 3 in case of private vehicles.

However, the 5-digit code in the capital province of Kabul was exhausted. Thus, newer license plates have an additional extra digit, only in Persian, located separately from the actual numerical code. In addition, two hyphens are shown at the top and bottom of the 6th number.

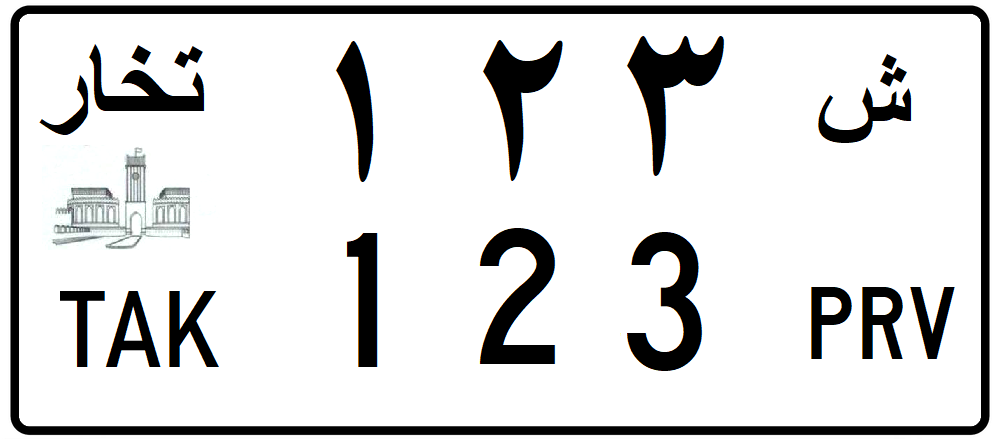
Sample 3-digit license plate from the province of Takhar

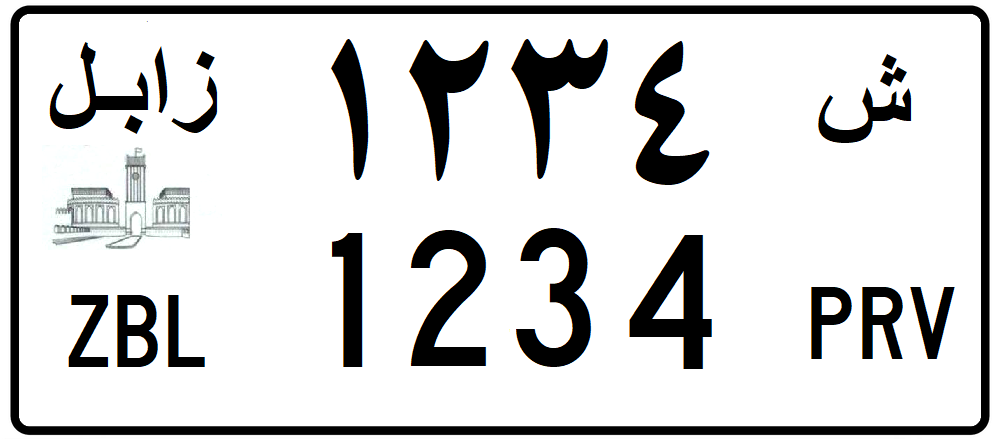
Sample 4-digit license plate from the province of Zabul

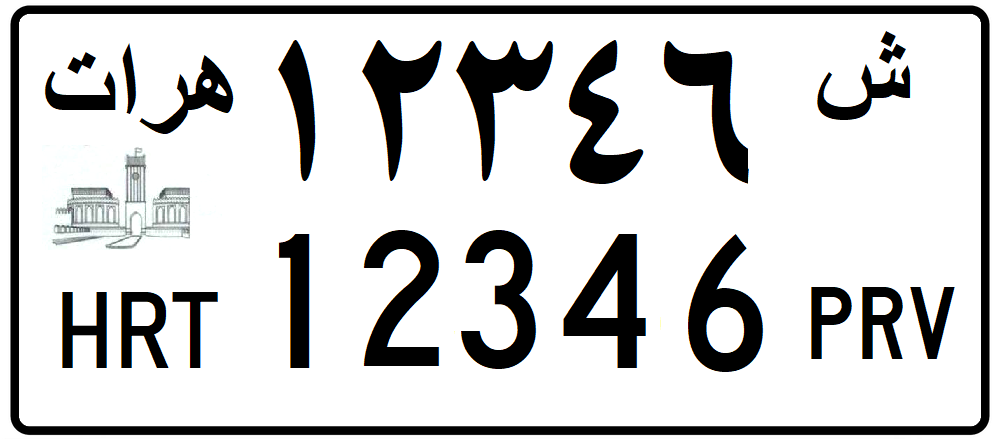
Sample 5-digit license plate from the province of Herat

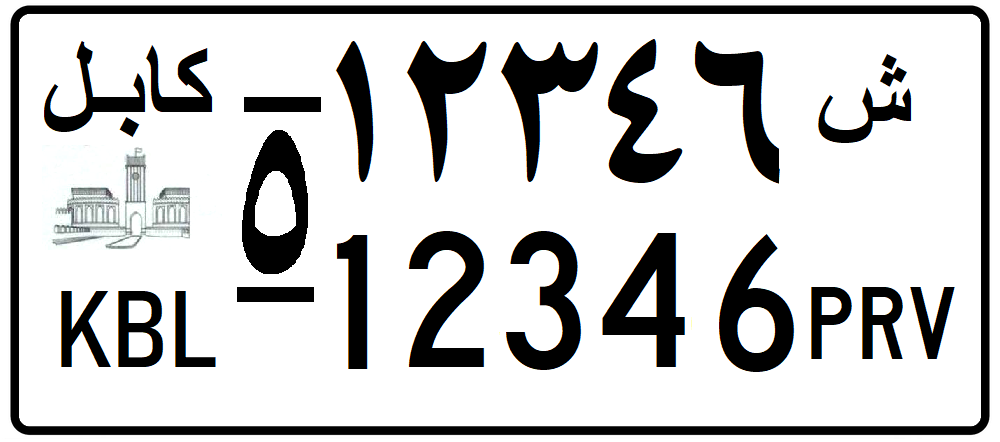
Sample 5-digit plus one additional digit license plate from the province of Kabul

== Vehicle types ==
Vehicle types
Type	Colour	Sample	Persian Code	Latin Code
Bus	Yellow, black letters		ب	B
Diplomatic	Red, white letters		None	CD
Governmental	Black, white letters		-	-
Lorry	White, black letters		ل	L
Motorcycle	White, black letters		م	M
Private	White, black letters		ش	PRV
Private; Duplicate	White, black letters		ش م/ث	DUPL
Private; Temporary^{(1)}	White, black letters, red letters		ش - موقت	TEMP
Rickshaw	White, black letters		ر	TRC
Taxi	Yellow, black letters		ت	T
United Nations	Blue, black letters		None	None

Notes

1. Temporary license plates began being issued by the authorities of the Islamic Emirate of Afghanistan in September 2023. These license plates are valid for a period of three years, and are issued to vehicles that do not have official ownership deed and registration. They are mostly left-hand drive vehicles (steering wheel installed on the right-hand side of the car), imported from Pakistan or elsewhere, as they do not meet the basic requirement of legal registration. Nevertheless, installing license plates and keeping track of such cars, as well as facilitating their legal sale and purchase made it necessary to come up with a registration provision.

== Provinces ==
In Afghanistan, license plates indicate the province in which the vehicle is registered in, both in Persian or Pashto, and with a 3-Letter Latin Code. Below is the Persian/Pashto name of each province and the 3-letter code shown on the license plate for each province.

Provinces of Afghanistan (Note: References and details on data provided in the table can be found within the individual provincial articles.)
Province	Persian/Pashto	Latin Code	Province	Persian/Pashto	Latin Code
Badakhshan	بدخشان	BDN	Kunar	کونر	KNR
Badghis	بادغیس	BDS	Kunduz	کندوز	KDZ
Baghlan	بغلان	BAG	Laghman	لغمان	LGM
Balkh	بلخ	BLH	Logar	لوگر	LGR
Bamyan	بامیان	BMN	Nangarhar	ننگرهار	NGR
Daykundi	دایکندی	DYK	Nimruz	نیمروز	NRZ
Farah	فراه	FRH	Nuristan	نورستان	NUR
Faryab	فاریاب	FRB	Paktia	پکتیا	PAK
Ghazni	غزنی	GZN	Paktika	پکتیکا	PKT
Ghor	غور	GHR	Panjshir	پنجیشیر	PJR
Helmand	هملند	HEL	Parwan	پروان	PRN
Herat	هرات	HRT	Samangan	سمنگان	SAM
Jowzjan	جوزجان	JZJ	Sar-e Pol	سرپل	SPL
Kabul	کابل	KBL	Takhar	تخار	TAK
Kandahar	کندهار	KDR	Urozgan	اروزگان	ORZ
Kapisa	کپیسا	KAP	Wardak	وردک	WDK
Khost	خوست	KST	Zabul	زابل	ZBL

== Cross-border international plates ==
Beginning in January 2026, plates bearing only Western Arabic numerals and category (e.g. BUS) were issued in Herat province to taxis, buses and cargo trucks operating between Afghanistan and Iran, with plans to further expand to other provinces.

== See also ==
- Curse of 39 – Number considered bad luck in Afghanistan
