= Mechanical floor =

Mechanical rooms-only skyscraper section

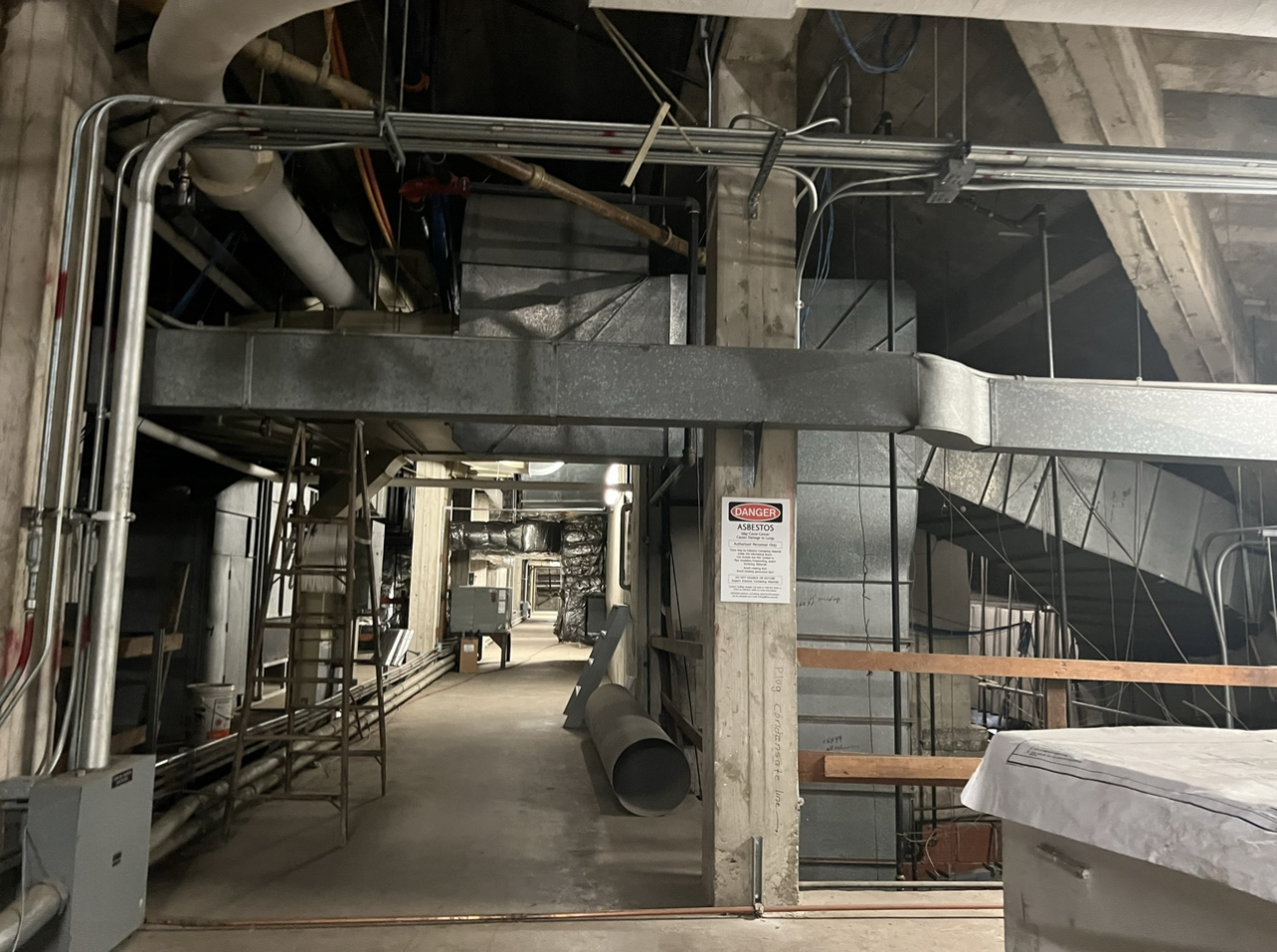
Mechanical attic (fourth floor) in Moore Hall at UCLA

A mechanical floor, mechanical penthouse, mechanical layer or mechanical level is a story of a high-rise building that is dedicated to mechanical and electronics equipment. "Mechanical" is the most commonly used term, but words such as utility, technical, service, and plant are also used. They are present in all tall buildings, including the world's tallest skyscrapers, with significant structural, mechanical and aesthetics concerns.

While most buildings have mechanical rooms, typically in the basement, tall buildings require dedicated floors throughout the structure for this purpose, for a variety of reasons. Because they consume valuable floor area (just like elevator shafts), engineers try to minimize the number of mechanical floors while allowing for sufficient redundancy in the services they provide. As a rule of thumb, skyscrapers require a mechanical floor for every 10 tenant floors (10%), although this percentage can vary widely (see examples below). In some buildings, they are clustered in groups that divide the building into blocks, while in others they are spread evenly through the structure, and in still others, they are mostly concentrated at the top.

Mechanical floors are generally counted in the building's floor numbering (this is required by some building codes) but are accessed only by service elevators. Some zoning regulations exclude mechanical floors from a building's maximum area calculation, permitting a significant increase in building sizes; this is the case in New York City. Sometimes buildings are designed with a mechanical floor located on the thirteenth floor, to avoid problems in renting the space due to superstitions about the number.

== Structural concerns ==
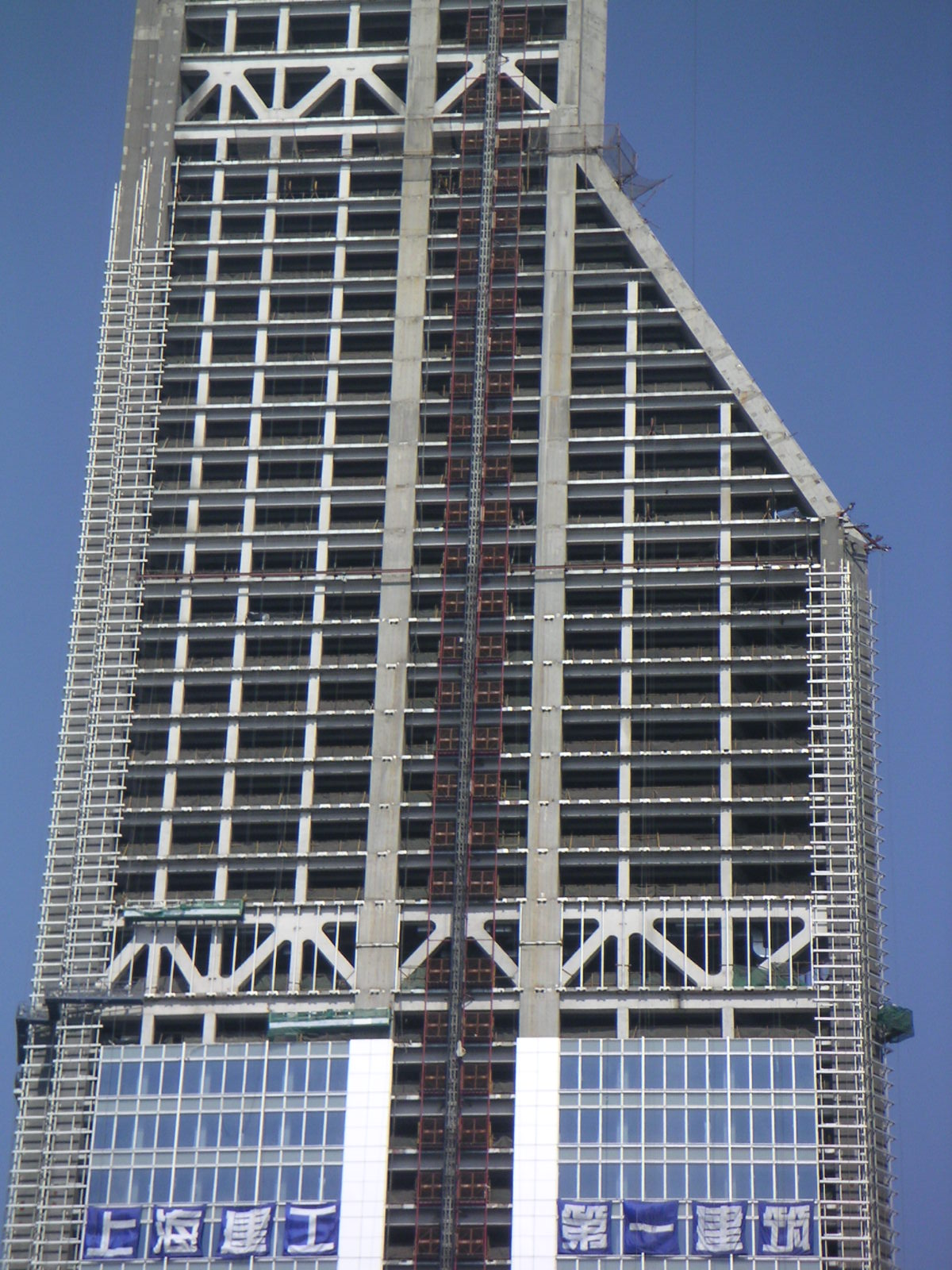
A 60-story building under construction in Shanghai. The truss sections (made of triangular struts) will house mechanical floors.

Some skyscrapers have narrow building cores that require stabilization to prevent collapse. Typically, this is accomplished by joining the core to the external supercolumns at regular intervals using outrigger trusses. The triangular shape of the struts precludes the laying of tenant floors, so these sections house mechanical floors instead, typically in groups of two. Additional stabilizer elements such as tuned mass dampers also require mechanical floors to contain or service them.

This layout is usually reflected in the internal elevator zoning. Since nearly all elevators require machine rooms above the last floor they service, mechanical floors are often used to divide shafts that are stacked on top of each other to save space. A transfer level or skylobby is sometimes placed just below those floors.

Elevators that reach the top tenant floor also require overhead machine rooms; those are sometimes put into full-size mechanical floors but most often into a mechanical penthouse, which can also contain communications gear and window-washing equipment. On most building designs, this is a simple "box" on the roof, while on others it is concealed inside a decorative spire. A consequence of this is that if the topmost mechanical floors are counted in the total, there can be no such thing as a true "top-floor office" in a skyscraper with this design.

== Mechanical concerns ==
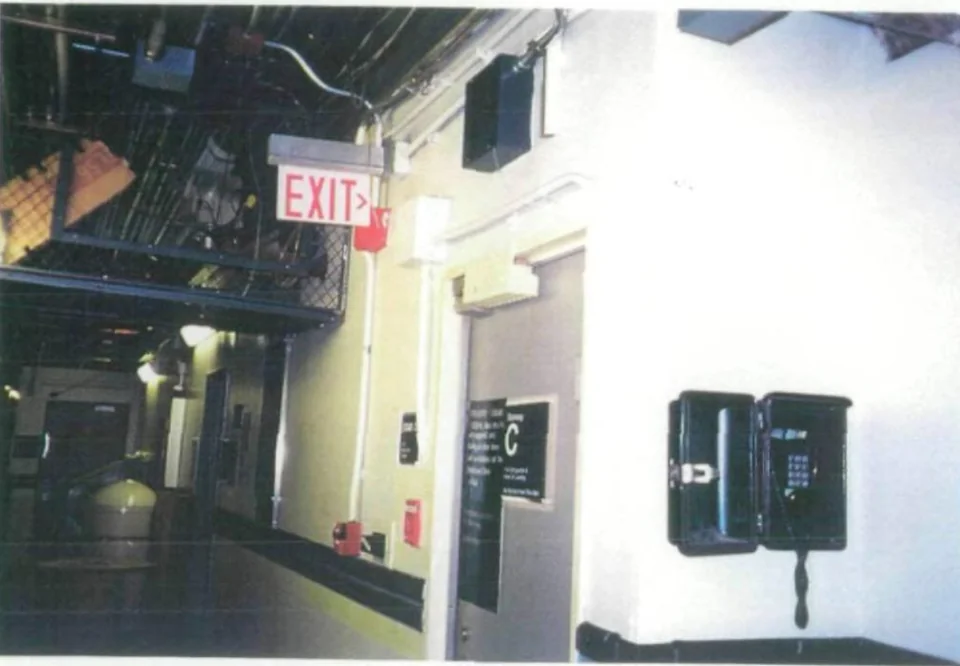
Mechanical floor of the South Tower of the World Trade Center, c. September-October 2000. The Twin Towers required multiple mechanical floors at all levels of the skyscrapers for HVAC and elevator systems.

Besides structural support and elevator management, the primary purpose of mechanical floors is to house heating, ventilation, and air conditioning (HVAC) equipment. They may contain air handling units, cooling towers (in mechanical penthouses), electrical generators, chiller plants, and water pumps.

In particular, the problem of bringing and keeping water on the upper floors is an important constraint in the design of skyscrapers. Water is necessary for tenant use, air conditioning, equipment cooling, and basic firefighting through sprinklers (especially important since ground-based firefighting equipment usually cannot reach higher than a dozen floors or so). It is inefficient, and seldom feasible, for water pumps to send water directly to a height of several hundred meters, so intermediate pumps and water tanks are used. The pumps on each group of mechanical floors act as a relay to the next one up, while the tanks hold water in reserve for normal and emergency use. Usually the pumps have enough power to bypass a level if the pumps there have failed, and send water two levels up.

Special care is taken towards fire safety on mechanical floors that contain generators, compressors, and elevator machine rooms, since oil is used as either a fuel or lubricant in those elements.

Mechanical floors also contain communication and control systems that service the building and sometimes outbound communications, such as through a large rooftop antenna (which is also physically held in place inside the top-floor mechanical levels).

Modern computerized HVAC control systems minimize the problem of equipment distribution among floors by enabling central remote control.

== Aesthetics concerns ==
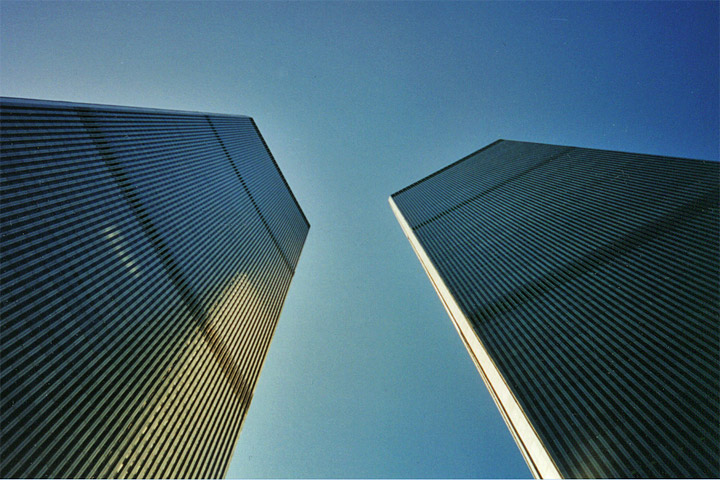
The former World Trade Center twin towers. The "dark bands" were vents for the mechanical floors.

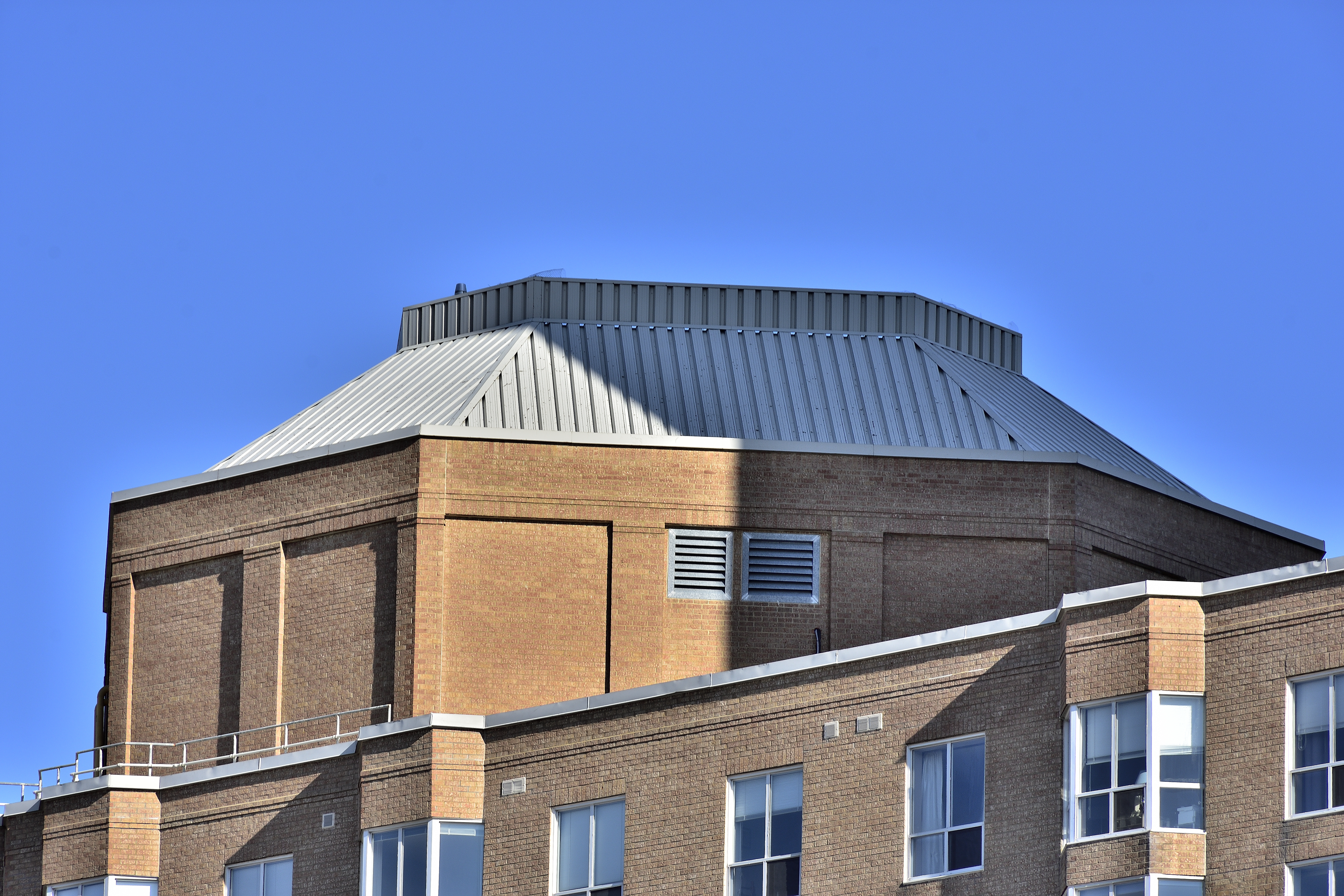
Mechanical equipment (elevator engine, cooling tower, and boiler) serving a high rise condominium, concealed within a decorative concrete enclosure to match the exterior of building

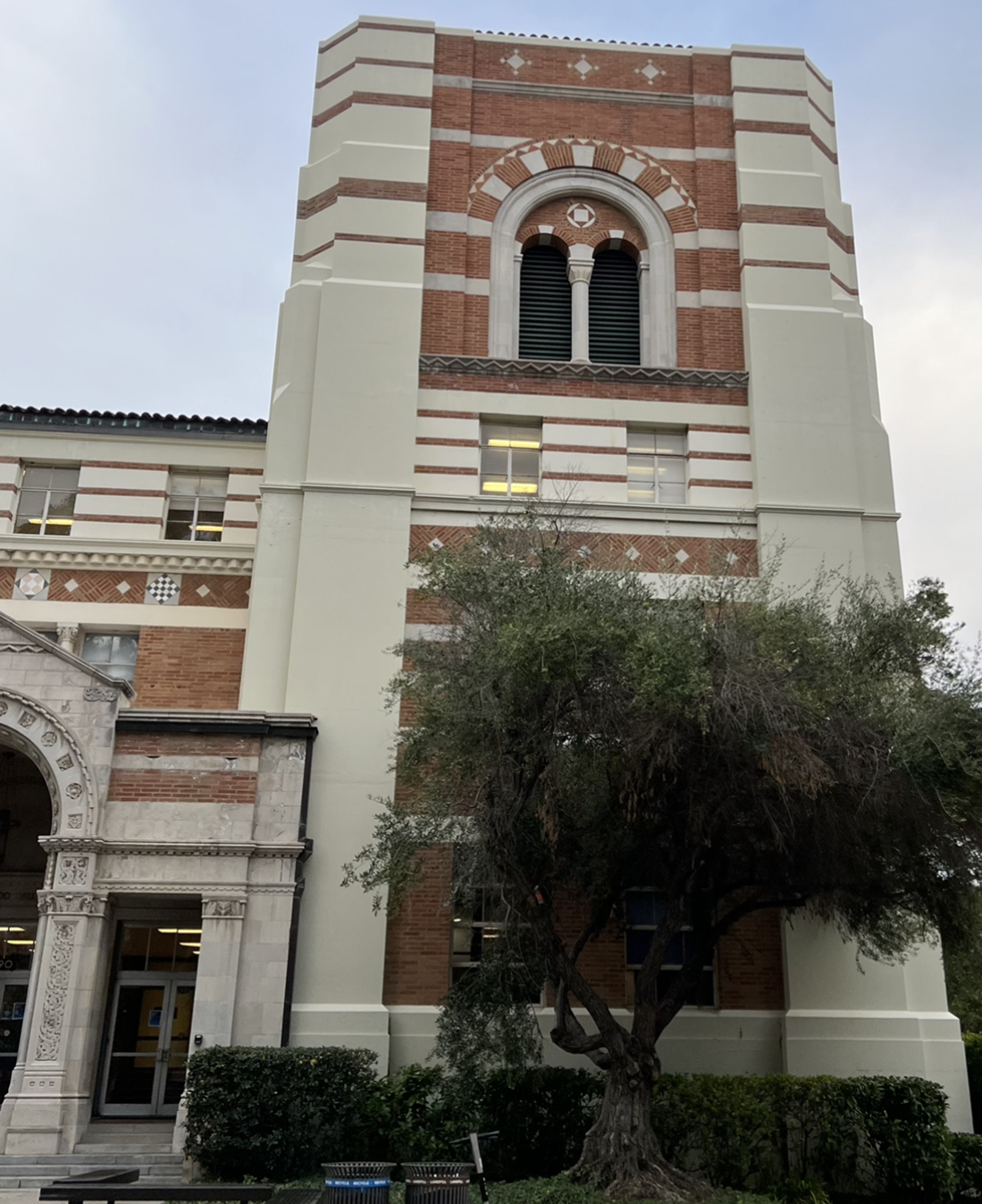
The mechanical penthouse (housing HVAC machinery) of Dodd Hall at UCLA is seen disguised as a bell tower with louvers provided for ventilation.

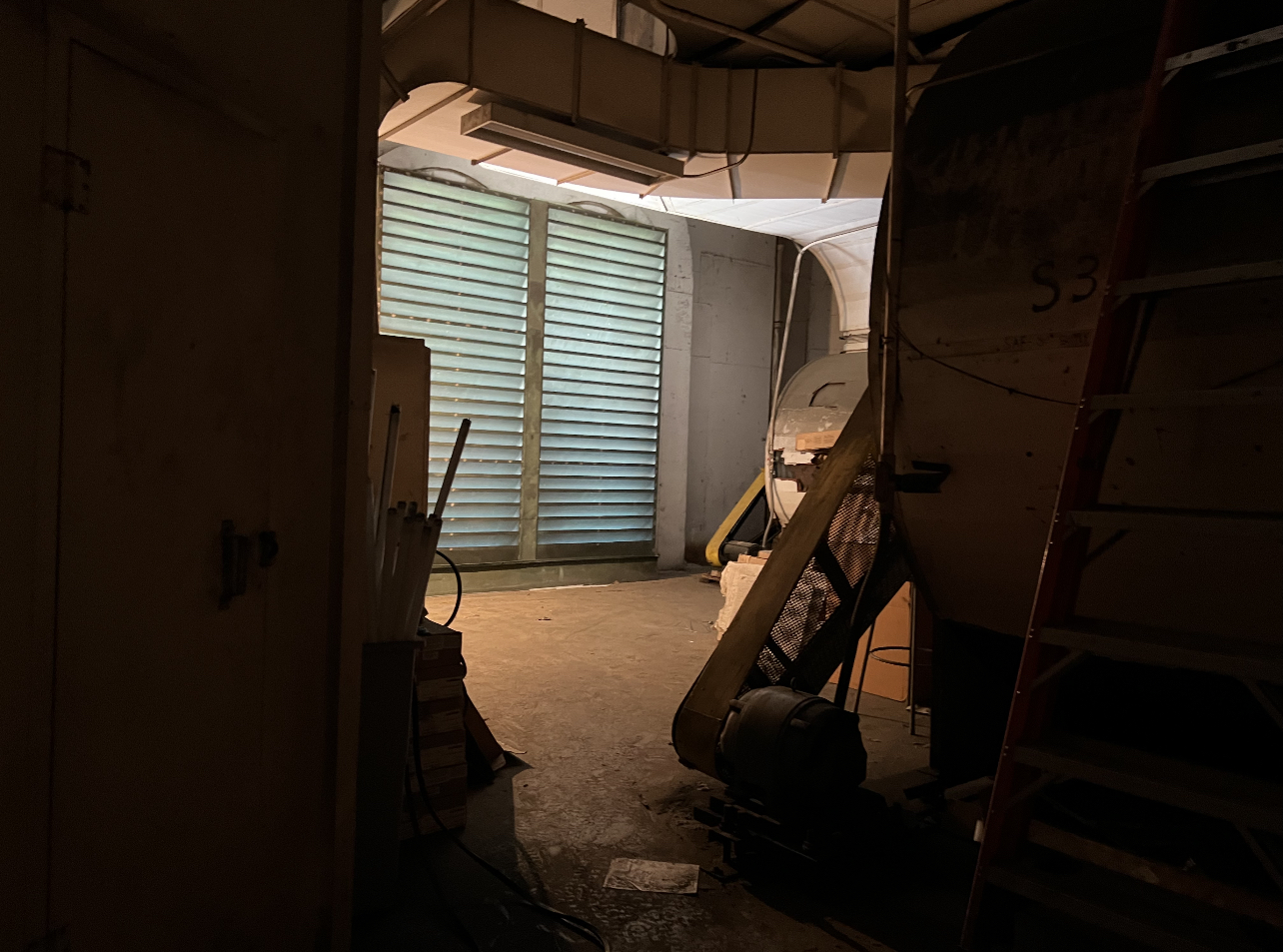
Dodd Hall mechanical penthouse as seen inside. Louvers are on the opposite wall.

Most mechanical floors require external vents or louvers for ventilation and heat rejection along most or all of their perimeter, precluding the use of glass windows. The resulting visible "dark bands" can disrupt the overall facade design, especially if it is fully glass-clad. Different architectural styles approach this challenge in different ways.

In the Modern and International styles of the 1960s and 1970s where form follows function, the vents' presence is not seen as undesirable. Rather it emphasizes the functional layout of the building by dividing it neatly into equal blocks, mirroring the layout of the elevators and offices inside. This could be clearly seen on the Twin Towers of the World Trade Center and can be seen on the Willis Tower. In the IDS Tower in Minneapolis, the lowest mechanical floor serves as a visual separation from the street- and skyway-level Crystal Court shopping center and the office tower above; the upper mechanical floor (above the 50th and 51st floors, the uppermost occupied floors) serves as a "crown" to the building.

Conversely, designers of the recent postmodern-style skyscrapers strive to mask the vents and other mechanical elements in various ways. This is accomplished through such means as complex wall angles (Petronas Towers), intricate latticework cladding (Jin Mao Building), or non-glassed sections that appear to be ornamental (Taipei 101, roof of Jin Mao Building).

Some low-rise, residential (usually apartment buildings or dormitories), or non-residential buildings, especially built in an architecture style that promotes the use of elements such as sloped roofs and/or bell towers, may have mechanical floors disguised as attics or towers. In this case, the ventilation systems of the mechanical floor are seen as gable vents, dormers, or abat-sons (louvers in a bell tower). Examples include some buildings in UCLA, like Dodd Hall, which has a mechanical floor disguised as an attic and a bell tower.

== Examples ==
These are examples of above-ground mechanical floor layouts for some of the world's tallest buildings. In each case, mechanical penthouses and spires are counted as floors, leading to higher total floor counts than usual.

- Taipei 101: Floors 7–8, 17–18, 25–26, 34, 42, 50, 58, 66, 74, 82, 87, 90, 92 to 100 in the penthouse – total 17/102, 17%. The official count of 11 corresponds to the number of groups in the office section. Floors 92–100 contain communications equipment and so are not typically counted as mechanical since they do not service the building itself.
- One World Trade Center: Floors 2–19, 92–99, and 103–104 – total 28/104, 26%.
- Previous WTC (Twin Towers): Floors 7–8, 41–42, 75–76, and 108–109 – total 8/110, 7%. The 110th Floor of 1 WTC (North Tower) housed television and radio transmission equipment. Some sources erroneously mention 12 floors, in groups of three, due to the height of the vents (actually the ceilings there were higher) and because levels 44 and 78 were skylobbies which in many buildings sit directly on top of the mechanical floors. However, the twin towers had one occupied office floor under each skylobby, accessible through escalators.
- Willis Tower (Formerly Sears Tower): Levels 29–32, 64–65, 88–89, 104–108, 109 (penthouse), and 110 (penthouse roof) – total 15/110, 13%.
- Petronas Towers: Floors 6–7, 38–40, 43, 84, 87–88 – total 9/88, 10%
- Jin Mao Building: Floors 51–52, and 89–93 in the penthouse – total 7/93, 7.5%
- Burj Khalifa: Floors 17–18, 40–42, 73–75, 109–111, 136–138, 155, and 160–168, in the penthouse – total 25/168, 15%
- John Hancock Center: Floors 16–17, 42–43, 93, 99–100 (penthouse) – total 7/100, 7%
- Empire State Building: Floors 87–101 – total 15/102, 14%
- Shanghai Tower: Floors 6–7, 20–21, 35–36, 50–51, 66–67, 82–83, 99–100, 116–117, 122–124, and 128 – total 20/128, 16%
- Shanghai World Financial Center: Floors 6, 18, 30, 42, 54, 66, 78, 89, and 90 – total 9/101, 9%
- Lotte World Tower: Floors 3–4, 13, 21–23, 39–41, 59, 60, 72–75, 83, 84, 102–106, 115, and 116 – total 24/123, 20%
