= Curse of 39 =

Number considered bad luck in Afghanistan

In some parts of Afghanistan, the curse of 39 is the belief that the number 39 is a badge of shame for its purported link with prostitution. People have reported being mocked for having a phone number or vehicle registration plate that includes the number, with such cars also proving hard to sell.

Fear of the number can be referred to as triakontenneaphobia.

== Origin ==
The origin of the superstition is unclear, but it has widely been claimed to have been associated with a pimp who allegedly lived in the western city of Herat and who was nicknamed "39" after the registration plate of his expensive car and the number of his apartment. Others claim that the number translates into morda-gow (literally meaning "dead cow") which is a well-known slang term for a pimp. Others have blamed corrupt police officials for spreading the rumour in order to charge between $200–500 to change a "39" plate.

Officials have, in turn, blamed car dealers and "those who work for the mafia [who] started the rumours about 39 so they could buy cars with 39 plates cheaper and sell them back for higher prices after changing the plates", according to Abdul Qader Samoonwal of Kabul's Traffic and License Registration department.

== Perception ==
Afghan vehicle registration plates incorporating the number 39 are seen as so undesirable that cars bearing the numerals are said to be virtually unsellable in the capital, Kabul. The drivers of such vehicles have reported receiving abuse, derision, and other unwanted attention from pedestrians and other drivers, and some have had their registration plates altered to disguise the numbers.

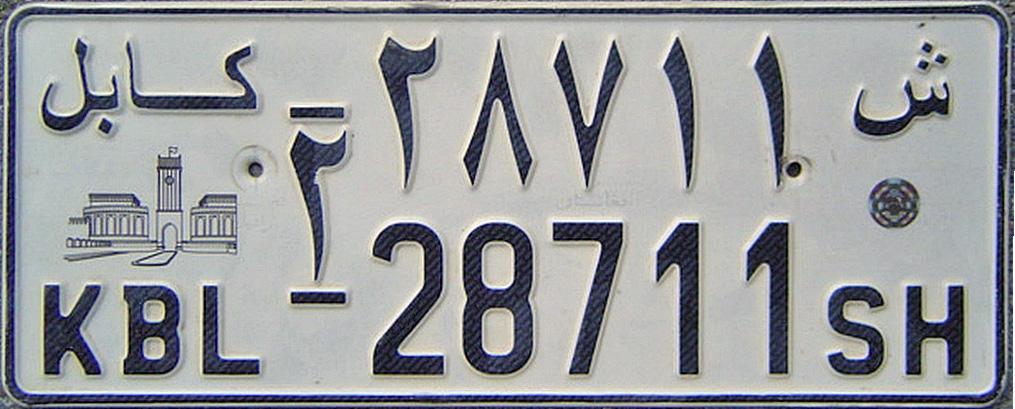
Kabul registration plate

The issue caused problems in Kabul after the Persian New Year of March 2011, when the government started to issue registration plates beginning with 39. Despite the threat of penalties, many drivers refused to register their cars while the number 39 still appeared on them. Drivers with license plates containing the digit 39 have reported receiving nicknames such as "Colonel 39". Cellphone owners have encountered similar problems, forcing them to hide their caller ID or switch their numbers altogether. Some 39-year-old Afghans refer to themselves as being "one less than 40" or "one year to 40" (Pashto: یک کم چهل, romanized: yak kam chehl).

During the 2010 Afghan parliamentary election; two people were killed when the guards of the candidate Mullah Tarakhil opened fire on civilians after a traffic accident, said to have been in reaction to people taunting the Tarakhil because he was listed 39th on the ballot.

== Reactions ==
Afghan government officials and numerologists have tried to resolve the claims about 39, though with little success. General Assadullah, the head of the traffic department in Kabul, described the problem as "nonsense" as 39 is "just a number". He noted that there is no religious prohibition against the number and his department has sought to reassure the public by noting where Muslims can find the number 39 in the Quran and even publishing a formula by which the number can be derived from the name "Allah".

Sediq Afghan, a famous numerologist, has likewise complained that people "only see the negative side" of the number and has called it "a sickness for Afghans". He told television viewers that associating the number with pimps "is a sin because 57 Suras from our Quran contain the number 39." The popular television satire show Danger Bell highlighted the issue but only succeeded in publicising it even further.

The superstition, which exists mainly in Kabul, has allowed some to profit. A car dealer told The Wall Street Journal that he "could knock several thousand dollars off the purchase price of a car in Kabul with 39 on its plate and then turn around to sell it for a profit in the surrounding provinces."

Owners of vehicles with "39" on their registration plates have sought to fix the problem themselves. Many have "edited" their own plates by painting or taping over the offending digits or altering them to make the number 3 look like an 8, or even covering over the entire plate. One driver told NPR: "I have no choice but to drive this car since I earn my living working here. But I have to cover the 39 plates with a blue sheet. I do this to protect the dignity of this organization and also of myself."

== See also ==
- Triskaidekaphobia
- Tetraphobia
