= Triskaidekaphobia =

Fear of the number 13

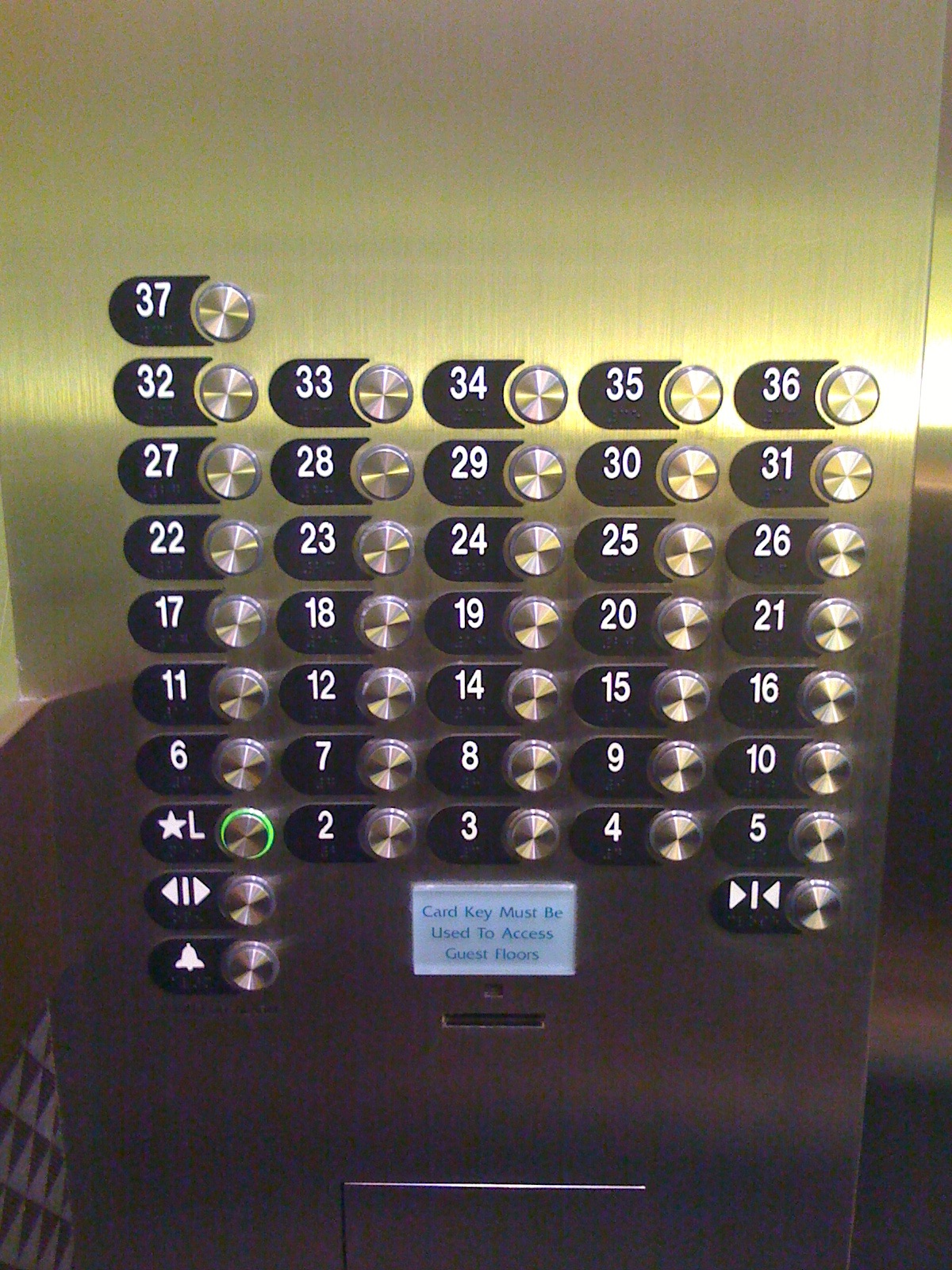
Elevator panel in a building in the United States, where floors proceed from 12 to 14

Triskaidekaphobia (/ˌtrɪskaɪˌdɛkəˈfoʊbiə/ TRIS-kye-DEK-ə-FOH-bee-ə, /ˌtrɪskə-/ TRIS-kə-; from Ancient Greek τρεισκαίδεκα (treiskaídeka) 'thirteen' and Ancient Greek φόβος (phóbos) 'fear') is fear or avoidance of the number 13. It is also a reason for the fear of Friday the 13th, called paraskevidekatriaphobia (from Greek Παρασκευή (paraskevi) 'Friday', Greek δεκατρείς (dekatreís) 'thirteen' and Ancient Greek φόβος (phóbos) 'fear') or friggatriskaidekaphobia (from Old Norse Frigg 'Frigg' and from Ancient Greek τρεισκαίδεκα (treiskaídeka) 'thirteen' and Ancient Greek φόβος (phóbos) 'fear').

The term was used as early as in 1910 by Isador Coriat in Abnormal Psychology.

== Origins ==
The supposed unlucky nature of the number 13 has several theories of origin. Although several authors claim it is an older belief, no such evidence has been documented so far. In fact, the earliest attestation of 13 being unlucky is first found after the Middle Ages in Europe.

=== Playing cards ===
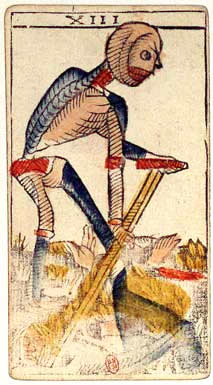
The Death card, number 13, from an 18th-century Tarot deck

Tarot card games have been attested since at least around 1450 with the Visconti-Sforza Tarot. One of the trump cards in tarot represents Death, and is numbered 13 in several variants.

In 1781, Antoine Court de Gébelin writes of this card's presence in the Tarot of Marseilles that the number thirteen was "toujours regarde comme malheureux" ("always considered as unlucky"). In 1784, Johann Gottlob Immanuel Breitkopf cites Gébelin, and reaffirms that the tarot card number 13 is death and misfortune ("Der Tod, Unglück").

=== 13 at a table ===
Since at least 1774, a superstition of "thirteen at a table" has been documented: if 13 people sit at a table, then one of them must die within a year. The origin of the superstition is unclear and various theories of its source have been presented over the years.

In 1774, Johann August Ephraim Götze speculated:

Da ich aus der Erfahrung weis, daß der Aberglaube nichts liebers, als Religionssachen, zu seinen Beweisen macht; so glaube ich bey nahe nicht zu irren, wenn ich den Ursprung des Gegenwärtigen mit der Zahl XIII, von der Stelle des Evangelii herleite, wo der Heiland, bey der Ostermahlzeit, mit zwölf Jüngern zu Tische saß.
Since I know from experience that superstition loves nothing better than religious matters as its proofs, I believe I'm almost certainly unmistaken when I derive the origin of the matter of the number XIII from the passage of the Gospel where the Savior sat at table with twelve disciples at the Easter meal.

From the 1890s, a number of English-language sources reiterated the idea that at the Last Supper, Judas, the disciple who betrayed Jesus, was the 13th to sit at the table. The Bible says nothing about the order in which the Apostles sat, but there were thirteen people at the table.

In 1968, Douglas Hill in Magic and Superstition recounts a Norse myth about 12 gods having a dinner party in Valhalla. The trickster god Loki, who was not invited, arrived as the 13th guest, and arranged for Höðr to shoot Balder with a mistletoe-tipped arrow. This story was also echoed in Holiday Folklore, Phobias and Fun by folklore historian Donald Dossey, citing Hill. However, in the Prose Edda by Snorri Sturluson, the story about Loki and Balder does not emphasize that there are 12 gods, nor does it talk about a dinner party or the number 13.

== Events related to "unlucky" 13 ==
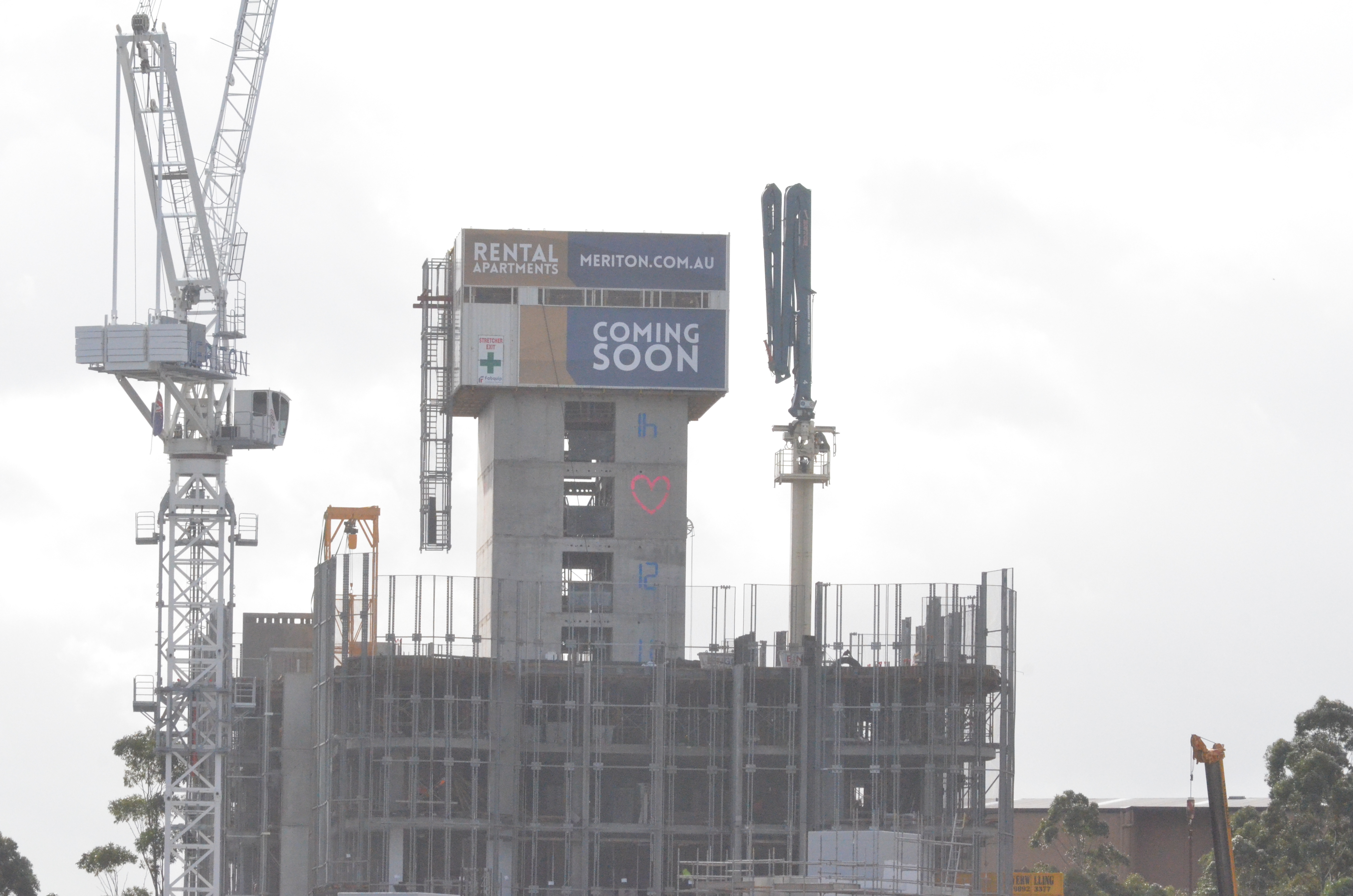
The exposed lift shaft of an apartment block under construction. The lift shaft has numbers marking the levels, but the 13th level is marked with a heart instead and the 14th level is marked with an upside down 4 to address tetraphobia.

- On Friday, October 13, 1307, the arrest of the Knights Templar was ordered by Philip IV of France. While the number 13 was considered unlucky, Friday the 13th was not considered unlucky at the time. The incorrect idea that their arrest was related to the phobias surrounding Friday the 13th was invented early in the 21st century and popularized by the novel The Da Vinci Code.
- In 1881, an influential group of New Yorkers, led by US Civil War veteran Captain William Fowler, came together to put an end to this and other superstitions. They formed a dinner cabaret club, which they called the Thirteen Club. At the first meeting, on January 13, 1881, at 8:13 p.m., thirteen people sat down to dine in Room 13 of the venue. The guests walked under a ladder to enter the room and were seated among piles of spilled salt. Many "Thirteen Clubs" sprang up all over North America over the next 45 years. Their activities were regularly reported in leading newspapers, and their numbers included five future US presidents, from Chester A. Arthur to Theodore Roosevelt. Thirteen Clubs had various imitators, but they all gradually faded due to a lack of interest.
- The British submarine HMS K13 sank on 29 January 1917 while on her trials after diving with a hatch and some vents still open. Although she was raised and 48 men were rescued, 32 sailors and civilian technicians died. When repaired, she was renamed K22 but was later involved in multiple collisions with other K-class submarines on 1 February 1918 in which a total of 103 men were killed, an event known as the Battle of May Island. In the subsequent British L-class submarine, the number L13 was not used.
- Apollo 13 was launched on April 11, 1970, at 13:13:00 CST and suffered an oxygen tank explosion on April 13 (although this was not a Friday) at 21:07:53 CST, forcing it to abort its mission to land on the Moon. All crew returned safely to Earth on April 17.
- The Friday the 13th mini-crash was a stock market crash that occurred on Friday, October 13, 1989.
- Vehicle registration plates in Ireland are such that the first two digits represent the year of registration of the vehicle (i.e., 11 is a 2011 registered car, 12 is 2012, and so on). In 2012, there were concerns among members of the Society of the Irish Motor Industry (SIMI) that the prospect of having "13" registered vehicles might discourage motorists from buying new cars because of superstition surrounding the number thirteen, and that car sales and the motor industry (which was already doing badly) would suffer as a result. The government, in consultation with SIMI, introduced a system whereby 2013 registered vehicles would have their registration plates' age identifier string modified to read "131" for vehicles registered in the first six months of 2013 and "132" for those registered in the latter six months of the year.^{1}

=== Effect on US space program mission naming ===
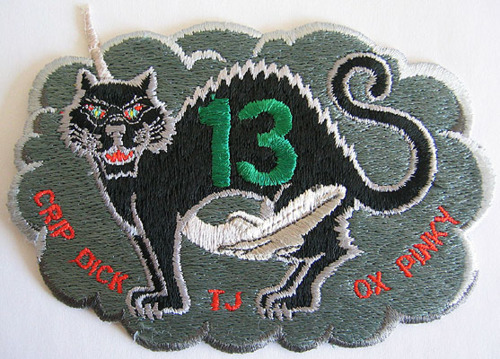
Alternate mission patch of STS-41C, with a 13 and a black cat, as it landed on April 13th, which was a Friday the 13th and this was the mission originally scheduled as STS-13

The disaster that occurred on Apollo 13 may have been a factor that led to a renaming that prevented a mission called STS-13. STS-41-G was the name of the thirteenth Space Shuttle flight. However, originally STS-41-C was the mission originally numbered STS-13. STS-41-C was the eleventh orbital flight of the space shuttle program.

The numbering system of the Space Shuttle was changed to a new one after STS-9. The new naming scheme started with STS-41B, the previous mission was STS-9, and the thirteenth mission (what would have been STS-13) would be STS-41C. The new scheme had first number stand for the U.S. fiscal year, the next number was a launch site (1 or 2), and the next was the number of the mission numbered with a letter for that period.

In the case of the actual 13th flight, the crew was apparently not superstitious and made a humorous mission patch that had a black cat on it. Also, that mission re-entered and landed on Friday the 13th which one crew described as being "pretty cool". Because of the way the designations and launch manifest work, the mission numbered STS-13 might not have actually been the 13th to launch as was common throughout the shuttle program; indeed it turned out to be the eleventh. One of the reasons for this was when a launch had to be scrubbed, which delayed its mission.

In a 2016 news article, NASA stated that the numbering system change was due to a much higher frequency of planned launches (pre-Challenger disaster). As it was, the Shuttle program did have a disaster on its one-hundred and thirteenth mission going by date of launch, which was STS-107. The actual mission STS-113 was successful, and had actually launched earlier due to the nature of the launch manifest.

On August 30, 2026, a leak in an oxidizer tank delayed the launch of SpaceX Crew-13, the first official NASA manned flight with the standalone number "13", with astronaut Luke Delaney stating "The numeral significance was not lost on us."

=== Omission of 13th rooms ===
Hotels, buildings and elevator manufacturers have also avoided using the number 13 for rooms and floors based on triskaidekaphobia.

Several notable streets in London lack a No. 13, including Fleet Street, Park Lane, Oxford Street, Praed Street, St. James's Street, Haymarket and Grosvenor Street.

== Thirteenth floor ==
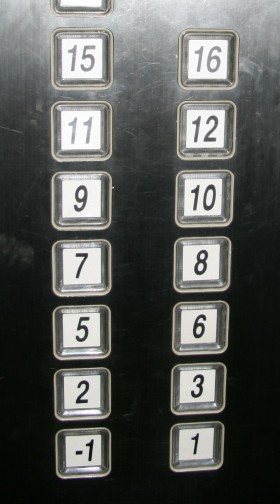
Panel from an elevator in a residential apartment building in Shanghai. Floors 4, 13 and 14 are missing, because of the similarity between the pronunciation of the word "four" and "death" in Chinese.

The thirteenth floor is a designation of a level of a multi-level building that is often omitted in countries where the number 13 is considered unlucky. Omitting the 13th floor may take a variety of forms; the most common include denoting what would otherwise be considered the thirteenth floor as level 14, giving the thirteenth floor an alternative designation such as "12A" or "M" (the thirteenth letter of the Latin alphabet), or closing the 13th floor to public occupancy or access (e.g., by designating it as a mechanical floor).

Reasons for omitting a thirteenth floor include triskaidekaphobia on the part of the building's owner or builder, or a desire by the building owner or landlord to prevent problems that may arise with superstitious tenants, occupants, or customers. In 2002, based on an internal review of records, Dilip Rangnekar of Otis Elevators estimated that, among buildings with thirteen or more floors and Otis brand elevators, 85% did not have a floor named the 13th floor. Early tall-building designers, fearing a fire on the 13th floor, or fearing tenants' superstitions about the rumor, decided to omit having a 13th floor listed on their elevator numbering. This practice became commonplace, and eventually found its way into American mainstream culture and building design.

Vancouver city planners have banned the practice of skipping 4s and 13s, since it could lead to mistakes by first responders, such as going to the wrong floor in an emergency.

=== Origin ===
The origin of skipping the thirteenth floor when installing elevators is not known. However, during the advent of early skyscrapers, New York architectural critics warned developers not to exceed the height of the 13th floor. These critics insisted that buildings rising above the 13th floor (130 feet or 40 metres) would lead to increased street congestion, ominous shadows and lower property values. Nevertheless, in a work published in 1939, sociologist Otto Neurath compared the use of money in an economy, which he saw as unnecessary, to the superstition of not installing the thirteenth floor: merely a social convention.

=== Methods of avoiding ===
- Skipping: Most commonly, 13 is skipped, as in: 12, 14, 15... The floor labeled "14" on the elevator is the thirteenth floor and the number 13 is skipped on the elevator console. In such buildings, floors after 12 are nominally incorrect, with their labeled floor being one higher than the actual floor. Many ships, including cruise liners have omitted having a 13th deck due to triskaidekaphobia. Instead, the decks are numbered up to 12 and skip straight to number 14.
- 12A, 12B, 14: Sometimes to keep numbers consistent the 13th floor is simply renumbered as 12A or 12B, as in: 12, 12A, 14.., or 12, 12B, 14; this does not affect the numbers of the higher floors. Likewise, 14 could be used for the 13th floor and 14A or 14B could be used for the 14th floor.
- Special designations: Other buildings will often use names for certain floors to avoid giving a floor on the building the number 13 designation. One such example is the Radisson Hotel in Winnipeg, Manitoba, where the 13th floor is called the pool floor. Another example is the Sheraton on the Falls in Niagara Falls, Ontario, where the 13th floor consists solely of a restaurant. A third example is the Trump International Hotel and Tower Chicago in Chicago, Illinois, where the 13th floor is the mezzanine floor.
- Uninhabited 13th floor: sometimes, the floor is put to some other use, such as a mechanical floor. Such usage is sometimes the subject of conspiracy theories (see below).
- Letter M: In Richmond, Virginia, the Monroe Park Towers has a 13th floor, but it is used for mechanical equipment and is only accessible from the freight elevator or the stairs. The M designation on the elevator buttons of the freight elevator can also be construed as meaning the Mechanical level in this particular building, or as a Mezzanine level.
- Split-level apartments: Sometimes, a tenement block will contain split-level apartments where the units themselves contain internal staircases and the main elevators for the building therefore do not stop on every floor. One example is Princess Towers in Kingston, Ontario, which has 16 1/2 stories excluding the roof-top. The elevators stop at B (basement), G (ground), 3, 6, 9, 12 and 15th floors only. In this case, the unmarked 11th and 13th floors are accessed within units on the marked 12th floor.

=== Research ===
In a 2007 Gallup poll, 13 percent of American adults reported that they would be bothered if given a hotel room on the thirteenth floor, while 9 percent indicated that they would be sufficiently bothered to request a room on a different floor. Research on thirteenth-floor effects on real estate values presents a mixed picture. Several prominent American real estate developers have claimed that they are unaware of any reduction in the value of thirteenth-floor offices or apartments. On the other hand, in studies conducted in Russia, Antipov and Pokryshevskaya, and Burakov found that thirteenth-floor apartments were less likely to sell compared to apartments on twelfth or fourteenth floors. This effect, however, was eliminated if developers offered buyers a 10% or greater discount on the cost of thirteenth-floor apartments.

== Notable people with triskaidekaphobia ==
- Arnold Schoenberg
- Franklin D. Roosevelt
- Sholom Aleichem
- Stephen King
- Nick Yarris
- Ángel Nieto

== Lucky 13 ==
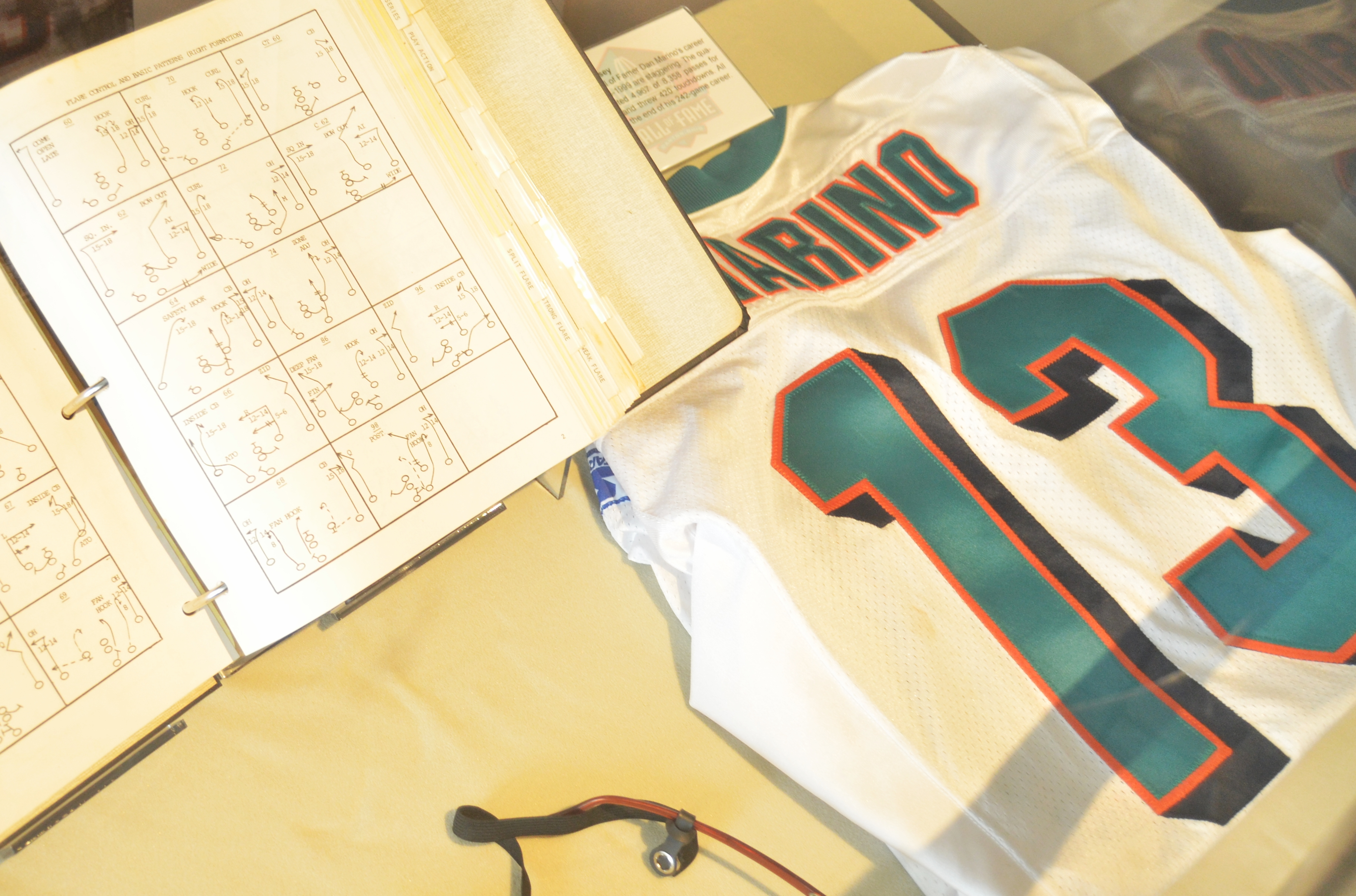
Dan Marino's 13 jersey in the Hall of Fame

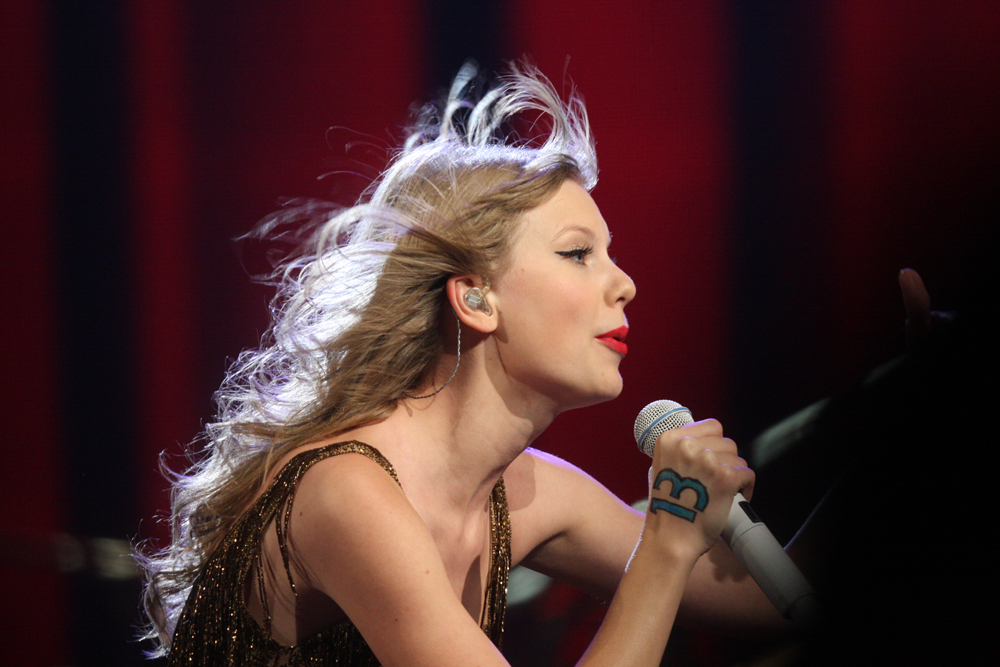
Taylor Swift performing with the number 13 written on her hand

Swifties write the number 13 on their hands to emulate Taylor Swift

In some regions, 13 is or has been considered a lucky number. For example, prior to the First World War, 13 was considered to be a lucky number in France, even being featured on postcards and charms. In more modern times, 13 is lucky in Italy except in some contexts, such as sitting at the dinner table. In Cantonese-speaking areas, including Hong Kong and Macau, the number 13 is considered lucky because it sounds similar to the Cantonese words meaning "sure to live" (as opposed to the unlucky number 14 which in Cantonese sounds like the words meaning "sure to die"). Colgate University was started by 13 men with $13 and 13 prayers, so 13 is considered a lucky number. Friday the 13th is the luckiest day at Colgate.

A number of sportspeople are known for wearing the number 13 jersey and performing successfully. On November 23, 2003, the Miami Dolphins retired the number 13 for Dan Marino, who played quarterback for the Dolphins from 1983 to 1999. Kurt Warner, St. Louis Rams quarterback (NFL MVP, 1999 & 2001, and Super Bowl XXXIV MVP) also wore number 13. Wilt Chamberlain, 13-time NBA All-Star, has had his No. 13 Jersey retired by the NBA's Golden State Warriors, Philadelphia 76ers, Los Angeles Lakers, Harlem Globetrotters, and Kansas University Jayhawks, all of which he played for. In 1966, the Portugal national football team achieved their best-ever result at the World Cup final tournaments by finishing third, thanks to a Mozambican-born striker, Eusebio, who has scored nine goals at World Cup – four of them in a 5-3 quarterfinal win over North Korea – and won the Golden Boot award as the tournament's top scorer while wearing the number 13. In the 1954 and 1974 World Cup finals, Germany's Max Morlock and Gerd Müller, respectively, played and scored in the final, wearing the number 13. More recent footballers playing successfully while wearing number 13, include Michael Ballack, Alessandro Nesta, and Rafinha. Among other sportspeople who have chosen 13 as their number, are Venezuelans Dave Concepción, Omar Vizquel, Oswaldo Guillén and Pastor Maldonado due to the number being considered lucky in Venezuelan culture. Swedish-born hockey player Mats Sundin, who played 14 of his 18 NHL seasons for the Toronto Maple Leafs, setting team records for goals and points, had his number 13 retired by the team on 15 October 2016.

Outside of the sporting industry, 13 is used as a lucky number by other individuals, including Taylor Swift who has made prominent use of the number 13 throughout her career.

== In popular culture ==
Some conspiracy theorists have suggested that the thirteenth floor in government buildings is not really missing, but actually contains top-secret governmental departments, or more generally that it is proof of something sinister or clandestine going on. This implication is often carried over, implicitly or explicitly, into popular culture; for example in:

- The films The Thirteenth Floor, Nightmare on the 13th Floor, and 1408.
- The hidden research and development labs of Network 23 in the television program Max Headroom.
- The top-secret research and development division of The Hitchhiker's Guide to the Galaxy in the fifth book of the series, Mostly Harmless.
- The computer game Floor 13 by Virgin Interactive.
- The sci-fi comedy Red Dwarf where "floor 13" referred to a secret brig which was several decks high.
- The book Company by Max Barry.
- The Superman story in Action Comics #448 (June 1975) featured a secret thirteenth floor used to teleport alien tourists from another planet to visit Earth.
- The "Night of Owls" storyline in Batman features the thirteenth floors of Gotham's buildings being used as bases by the assassins of a secret society that has ruled Gotham for generations.
- The level "The 13th Floor" in the computer game Tomb Raider: Chronicles.
- The episode "Grey 17 Is Missing" of the TV series Babylon 5 has a similar theme of a "missing" floor number actually containing a hidden floor with dark secrets.
- The psychedelic rock band The 13th Floor Elevators.
- The Rockford Files episode "Sticks and Stones May Break Your Bones, But Waterbury Will Bury You".
- The first-season episode "Ghost In The Machine" of the TV series The X-Files features a scene where the Central Operating System reads aloud each distinct level, omitting the thirteenth floor as the elevator ascends.
- In the Marvel Comics event storyline Iron Man 2020, an army of rebel robots and artificial intelligences have a safe haven in the form of an extra-dimensional plane of existence made of solid light called the Thirteenth Floor that can be reached through any elevator in Manhattan, and access to it manifests in the form of a button for the thirteen floor that only cyber beings can see that appears off to the side of a regular floor button panel.
- In the film No Country For Old Men, Carson Wells (Woody Harrelson) mentions to Man who hires Wells (Stephen Root) that one floor in a building seems to be missing.
- In the Canadian cartoon series Freaky Stories, an accountant becomes obsessed with finding the 13th floor, only become trapped with dozens of like-minded men by their collective obsession.

== See also ==
- List of phobias, including numerophobia
  - Tetraphobia, fear of the number 4, common in East Asia and Southeast Asia
  - Friday the 13th (paraskevidekatriaphobia or friggatriskaidekaphobia), considered to be a day of bad luck in a number of western cultures
  - Heptadecaphobia, fear of the number 17, common in Italy
  - The Curse of 39 (triakontenneaphobia), fear of the number 39, common in some parts of Afghanistan
  - Fears and superstitions associated with the number of the beast, including hexakosioihekkaidekaphobia, fear of the number 616, and hexakosioihexekontahexaphobia, fear of the number 666
- National Accident Day (Finland)

== Notes ==
^1 The main reason for this was stated to be to increase the number of car sales in the second half of the year. Even though 70% of new cars are bought during the first four months of the year, some consumers believe that the calendar year of registration does not accurately reflect the real age of a new car, since cars bought in January will most likely have been manufactured the previous year, while those bought later in the year will be actually made in the same year.
