= Heptadecaphobia =

Fear of the number 17

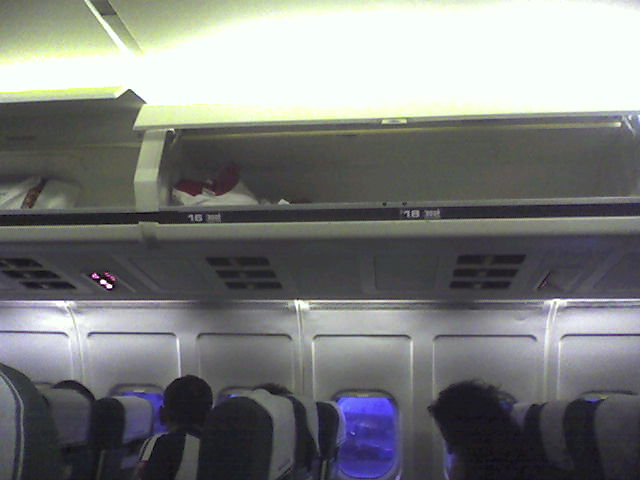
- Row 17 is omitted on this Alitalia plane
- Specialty: Psychology

Heptadecaphobia (Greek: δεκαεπτά dekaepta, "seventeen" and φόβος, phobos, "fear") is the fear of the number 17. In Italy, it is considered to be ill-fated and the date Friday the 17th is viewed as especially unfortunate. It is an ancient superstition, probably deriving from the fact that the Roman numeral XVII (17) is an anagram of vixi, meaning "I have lived" (i.e. I am dead). It is similar in nature to the fear of the number 13 in Anglo-Saxon countries.

== History ==
In Ancient Greece, the number 17 was despised by followers of Pythagoras, as the number was between 16 and 18, which were perfect representations of 4×4 and 3×6 quadrilaterals, respectively.

In the Genesis flood narrative, it is written that the flood began on the 17th of the second month (Genesis, 7–11).

It has been suggested that the Romans found the number 17 disturbing because in Roman numerals XVII is an anagram of vixi, meaning "I have lived" (i.e. I am dead).

In the Neapolitan smorfia, a traditional system that assigns symbolic meanings to numbers for use in the lottery, the number 17 is associated with 'a disgrazzia ("misfortune").

== Friday the 17th ==
In Italy, Friday the 17th (friggaheptadekaphobia or paraskevidekaeftaphobia) is a date of misfortune, as it is a date of two negatives: Friday (from Good Friday, the day of Jesus' death) and the number 17. It occurs when the 17th day of the month in the Gregorian calendar falls on a Friday, which happens at least once every year but can occur up to three times in the same year. For example, 2017 and 2023 had a Friday the 17th in February, March, and November, which also happened thrice in January, April, and July in 2020; 2015 and 2021 had two Friday the 17ths, as will 2025 through 2028; 2016, 2018, 2019, 2022 and 2024 had just one Friday the 17th.

Friday the 17th is similar to other unfortunate dates: for example, in Anglo-Saxon countries, this date is Friday the 13th, while in Spain, Greece, and South America, this date is Tuesday the 13th.

In mass media, the theme is portrayed in movies, such as The Virtuous Bigamist (Italian: Era di venerdì 17) and Shriek If You Know What I Did Last Friday the 13th (Italian: Shriek - Hai impegni per venerdì 17?), where in English the title refers to the number 13.)

A month has a Friday the 17th if and only if it begins on a Wednesday.

== See also ==
- List of phobias, including Numerophobia
