= Apeirophobia =

Fear of infinity

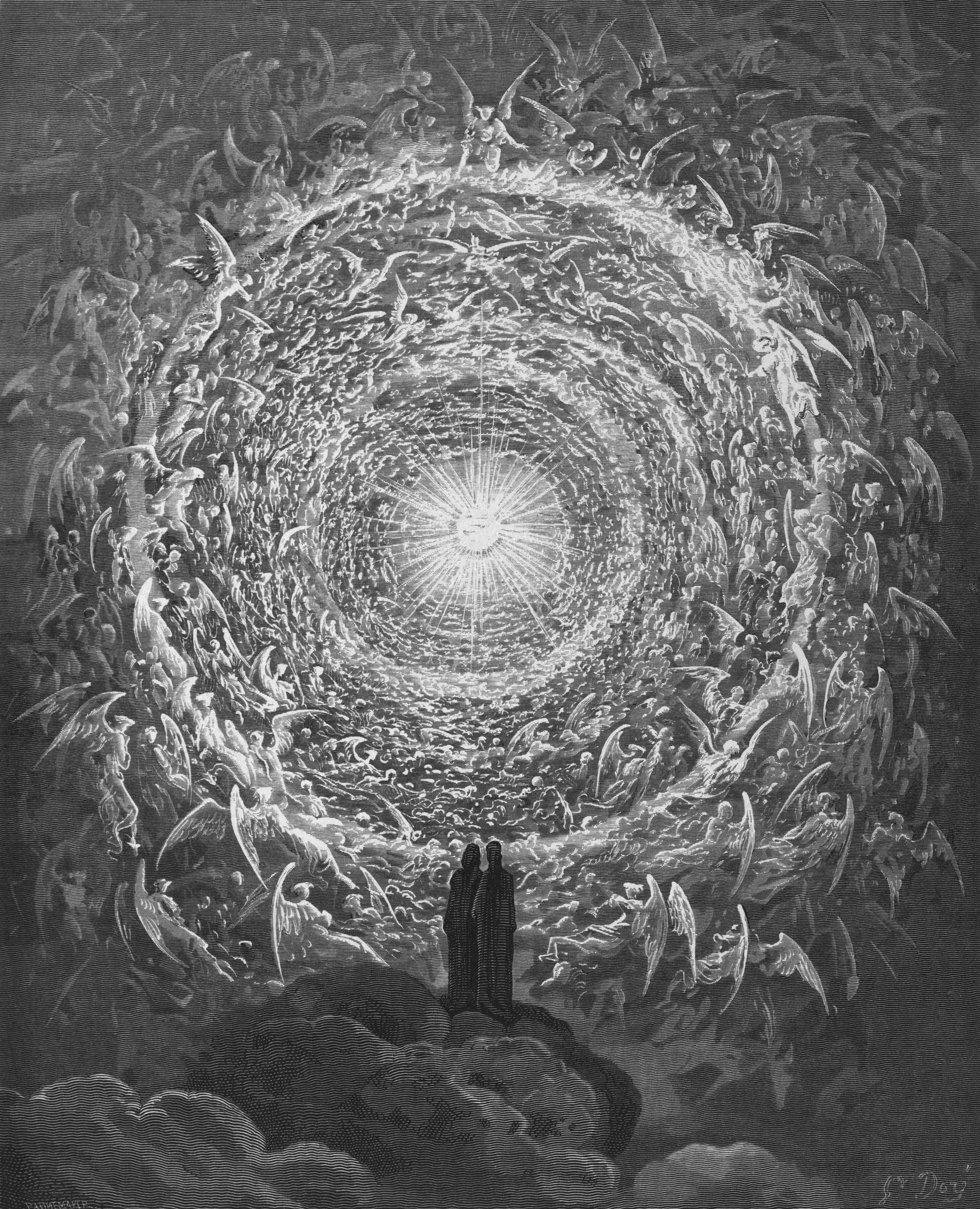
- Apeirophobia can arise from the fear of an eternal afterlife, such as Heaven in Christianity.
- Specialty: Clinical psychology, psychiatry
- Symptoms: Fear of infinity, fear of dying, panic attacks related to the event, or dreams relating to infinity, derealization, symptoms of existential OCD, disconnection from reality
- Complications: Harm to self, social isolation, anxiety disorder, suicide
- Usual onset: Adolescence or earlier
- Duration: Long-term
- Causes: Poorly understood
- Treatment: Cognitive behavioral therapy, exposure therapy, desensitization therapy
- Medication: Anti-anxiety medications

Apeirophobia (/əˈpiːrəˈfoʊbiˈə/ ə-PEER-ə-FOH-BEE-ə; from Ancient Greek: ᾰ̓́πειρος, romanized: ápeiros, lit. 'infinite, boundless') is the specific phobia of infinity, eternity, endlessness, or the uncountable and is also known as the fear of infinity, the fear of eternity, or the fear of endlessness, causing discomfort and sometimes panic attacks from intrusive thoughts of the infinity. It normally starts in adolescence or earlier and it is currently not known how it normally develops over time. Apeirophobia may be caused by existential dread about eternal life or oblivion following death. Due to this, it is often connected with thanatophobia (the phobia of death), chronophobia (the phobia of time or the passage of time), nihilophobia, and other existential fears. Sufferers commonly report feelings of derealization which may cause the perception of a dreamlike or distorted reality. Existential OCD may sometimes be the cause of obsessive thoughts about infinity or eternity, which can lead to or trigger apeirophobia. Like other phobias, apeirophobia may be tied to mental health conditions such as anxiety disorders or obsessive-compulsive disorder. Martin Wiener, a neuroscience professor at George Mason University, hypothesized that apeirophobia is a manifestation of the fear of an unknown future, similarly to the fear of aging.

There is very little research on this phobia. Despite not being recognized specifically by the American Psychiatric Association in the DSM-5, it does meet their criteria for a specific phobia, which is a type of anxiety disorder. There are no known treatment methods that are specifically designed to treat apeirophobia, although some apeirophobes have benefited from anti-anxiety medications or cognitive behavioral therapy.

Apeirophobia remains as an unknown phobia, since there is no data for official statistics on how many people actually suffer this phobia, nor is it not known by official clinical websites like Mayo Clinic, or Cleveland Clinic, or by therapists.

== See also ==
- Apeiron
- Existential crisis
- List of phobias
- Liminality
- Infinity
- Eternity
