= Tetraphobia =

Avoidance of the number four in many East Asian nations

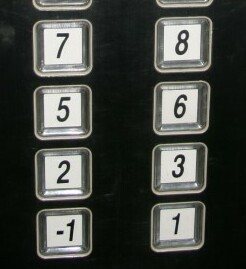
An elevator control panel in a residential apartment building in Shanghai with no floor numbered as the 4th

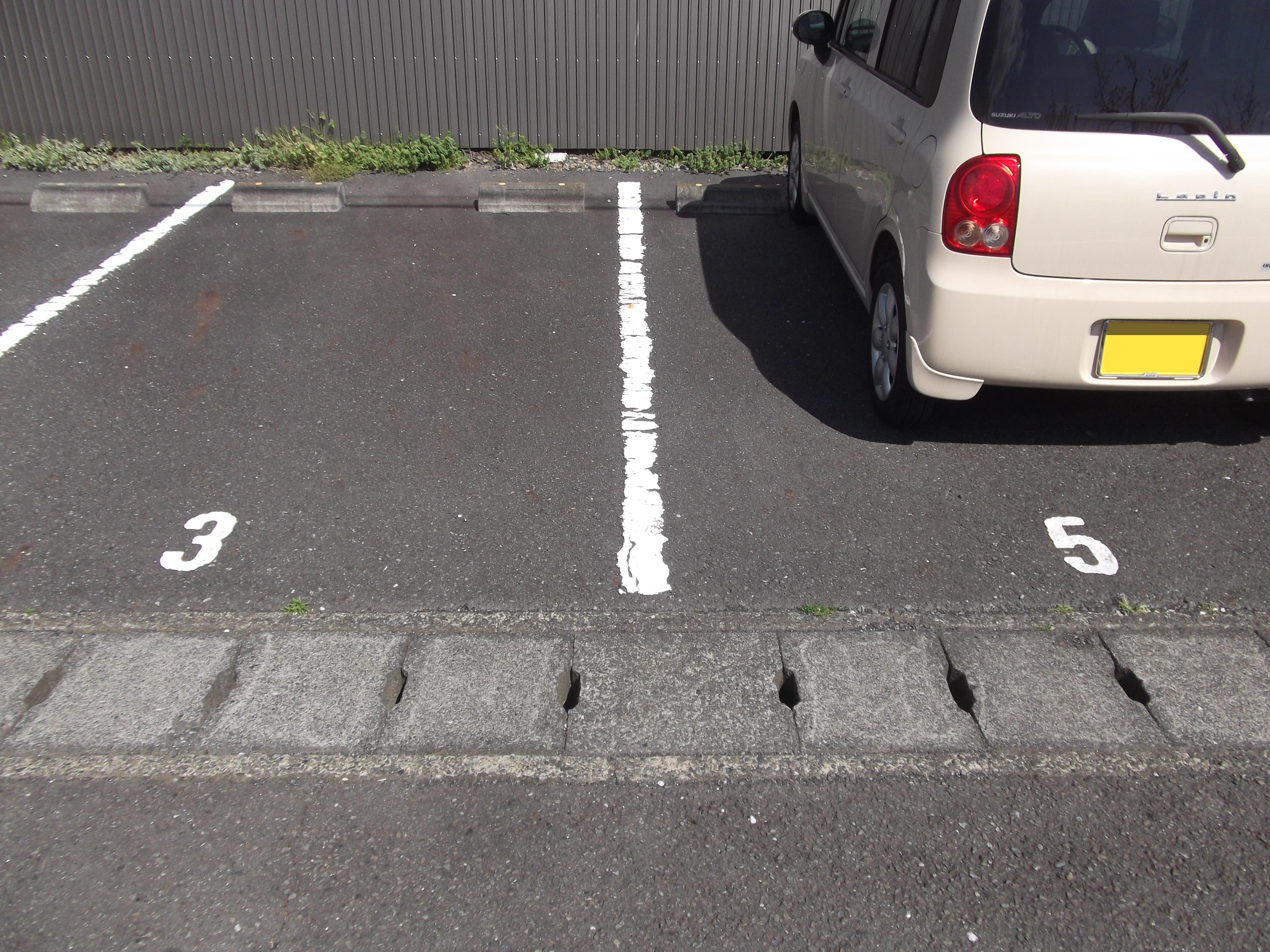
The number 4 missing in a parking lot in Japan

Tetraphobia (from Ancient Greek τετράς (tetrás) 'four') is the practice of avoiding instances of the digit number 4. It is a superstition most common in East Asian nations and is associated with death.

== Rationale ==
Language	Reading	
Language	四 (four)	死 (die)
Proto-Sino-Tibetan	*b-ləj	*səj
Old Chinese	/*s.lij-s/	/*sijʔ/
Middle Chinese	/siɪ^{H}/	/sˠiɪ^{X}/
Mandarin Chinese	sì	sǐ
Shanghainese	sy²	shi², sy²
Cantonese	sei³	sei²
Hakka	si³	si⁴
Hokkien	sì, sù	sí, sú
Vietnamese	tư, tứ	tử
Korean	sa	sa
Japanese	shi	shi

The Chinese word for "four" (四, pinyin: sì, jyutping: sei^{3}) sounds quite similar to the word for "death" (死, pinyin: sǐ, jyutping: sei^{2}) in many varieties of Chinese. Similarly, the Sino-Japanese, Sino-Korean and Sino-Vietnamese words for "four", shi (し, Japanese), sa (사, Korean) and tứ or tư (Vietnamese), sound similar or identical to "death" in each language (see Korean numerals, Japanese numerals, Vietnamese numerals). Tetraphobia is known to occur in Korea and Japan (since the two words sound identical to each other in both languages), but not in Vietnam because the Sino-Vietnamese words have different tones to distinguish the two words and the native Vietnamese words for "four" and "death" are much more widely used than the Sino-Vietnamese equivalents in everyday language.

Tetraphobia far surpasses triskaidekaphobia (Western superstitions around the number 13). It even permeates the business world in these regions of Asia.

== Cultural examples by regions ==
=== In Mainland China ===
Chinese is a tonal language with a comparatively small inventory of permitted syllables, resulting in an exceptionally large number of homophone words. Many of the numbers are homophones or near-homophones of other words and have therefore acquired superstitious meanings.

The Chinese avoid phone numbers and addresses with fours because the pronunciation in "four" and "death" differ only in tone, especially when a combination with another number sounds similar to undesirable expressions. Example: "94" could be interpreted as "certain death"

The tetraphobia is not apparent for the military and government institutions of the People's Republic of China. Chinese Communist Party and People's Liberation Army make free use of the number 4 in many military designations for equipment, with examples including the Dongfeng-4 ICBM, Type 094 submarine, and Type 054A frigate. Chinese government policies also usually contain the number 4 for expression. By contrast, the navies of the Republic of China (Taiwan) and of South Korea refrain from using the number 4 when assigning pennant numbers to their ships.

While in Mandarin-speaking regions in China, 14 and 74 are considered unluckier than the individual 4, because 14 (十四, pinyin: shí sì) sounds similar to "is dead" (是死, shì sǐ). Additionally, in some forms of the language, 1 is pronounced as (幺, yāo), which sounds close to (要, yào), which means "to want" or "will"; therefore, when combined with (四, sì), it sounds similar to "want to die" or "will die" (要死, yào sǐ). Likewise, 74 (七十四, pinyin: qī shí sì or colloquially 七四, pinyin: qī sì) sounds similar to "actually dead" (其实死/其實死, pinyin: qí shí sǐ) or "angered to death" (气死/氣死, pinyin: qì sǐ).

In recent years China has also avoided using the number 4 in aircraft registrations. An example is China Southern Airlines, with their A330s. One A330 is registered as B-8363, while the next is B-8365 and following B-8366. After B-8366 there is B-1062, B-1063 then B-1065, to avoid using the number 4 as in B-8364 and 1064. However, this policy only applies for aircraft that end with 4, so one will see B-8426 but not B-8264.

=== In Hong Kong ===
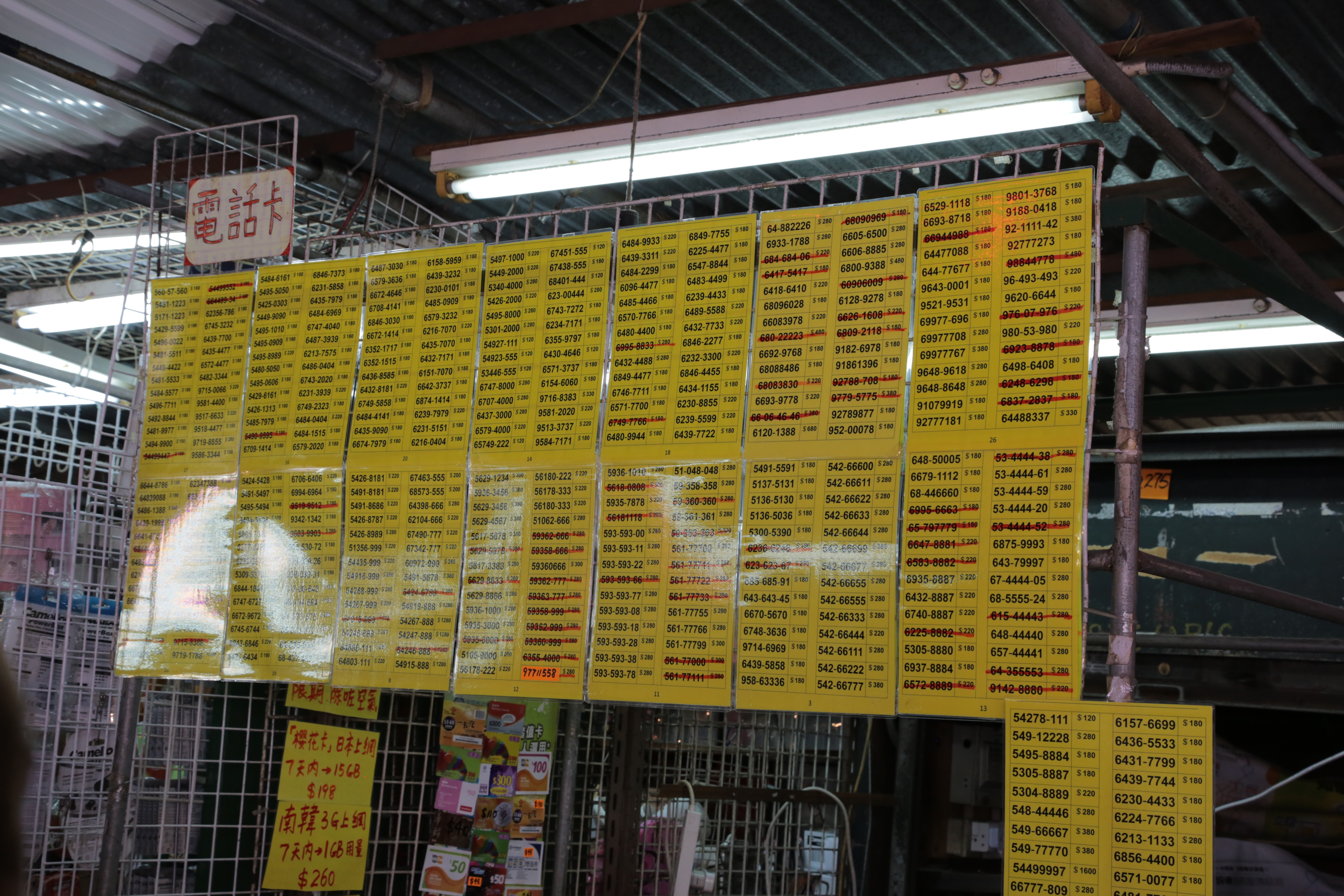
Phone numbers for sale in Hong Kong. Note the many fours.

In Hong Kong, some apartments such as Vista Paradiso and The Arch skip all the floors from 40 to 49, which is the entire 40s. Immediately above the 39th floor is the 50th floor, leading many who are not aware of tetraphobia to believe that some floors are missing. Tetraphobia is not the main reason, but rather as an excuse to have apartments with 'higher' floors, thus increasing the price, because higher floors in Hong Kong apartments are usually more expensive (see 39 Conduit Road). For Cantonese speakers, 14 and 24 are considered unluckier than the individual 4, because 14 (Cantonese Yale: sahp sei) sounds like "will certainly die" (實死, Cantonese Yale: saht séi), and 24 (Cantonese Yale: yih sei) sounds like "easy to die" (易死, Cantonese Yale: yih séi).

Due to the blending of East Asian and Western cultures, it is possible in some buildings that both the thirteenth floor and the fourteenth floor are skipped, causing the twelfth floor to precede the fifteenth floor, along with all the other 4s. Thus, a building whose top floor is numbered 100 could have just eighty floors.

=== In Japan ===
In Japan, the number 4 is avoided in some apartments and hospitals. The number 49 is also considered unlucky, as its pronunciation is similar to the Japanese term shiku, meaning 'to suffer and die'.

=== In Taiwan ===
In Taiwan, not using house numbers ending in 4 without also skipping numbers on the opposite side of the road often results in the numbers on two sides of a street getting more and more out of sync as one advances.

=== In Malaysia ===
In Malaysia, especially in regions or neighbourhoods where ethnic Chinese are significant in population, the floor number 4 or house address with number 4 is occasionally skipped. The practice is more prevalent in private condominiums, especially those built by ethnic Chinese-owned companies. The fourth floor may be either omitted completely or substituted with "3A".

=== In Singapore ===
Singaporean public transport operator SBS Transit has omitted the number plates for some of its buses whose numbers end with "4" due to this, so if a bus is registered as SBS***3*, SBS***4* will be omitted and the next bus to be registered will be SBS***5*. The final character is a checksum letter, not a number. For example, if a bus is registered as SBS8603J, SBS8604G will be omitted and the next bus to be registered will be SBS8605D.

Singaporean public transport operator SMRT has omitted the "4" as the first digit of the serial number of the train cars as well as the SMRT Buses NightRider services.

=== In Indonesia ===
In Indonesia since the 2000s, an increasing number of skyscrapers skip floors ending with, or containing implicit references to, the number 4 (as well as the 13th floor), especially in those funded by Chinese Indonesians. For example, in Lippo Mall Nusantara (owned by Lippo Group, which was founded by Chinese Indonesian Mochtar Riady), 4th floor is replaced by 3A. In The Energy Tower and most high-rises developed by Agung Sedayu Propertindo, 39th floor is followed by 50th floor. Some buildings, mostly owned by non-Chinese, have a 4th floor. Examples are government buildings, the Sarinah department store, and most buildings developed by Indonesian state-owned enterprises.

=== In Vietnam ===
In Vietnam, the Sino-Vietnamese words for "four" (tứ or tư) are used more in formal contexts or in reference to the days of the week like referring to "Wednesday" (thứ tư). When spoken, its sound is differentiated clearly from the word for "death" (tử). Tử is also used in formal contexts and proper nouns, tư and tử have to be used in compounds like bất tử (immortal) or Tứ Xuyên (Sichuan). The word bốn is often used much more in the place of tư to refer to the number 4. Tetraphobia is not common in Vietnam as the Sino-Vietnamese words for four and death aren't as commonly used compared to their native Vietnamese equivalents, bốn and chết, respectively.

=== In South Korea ===
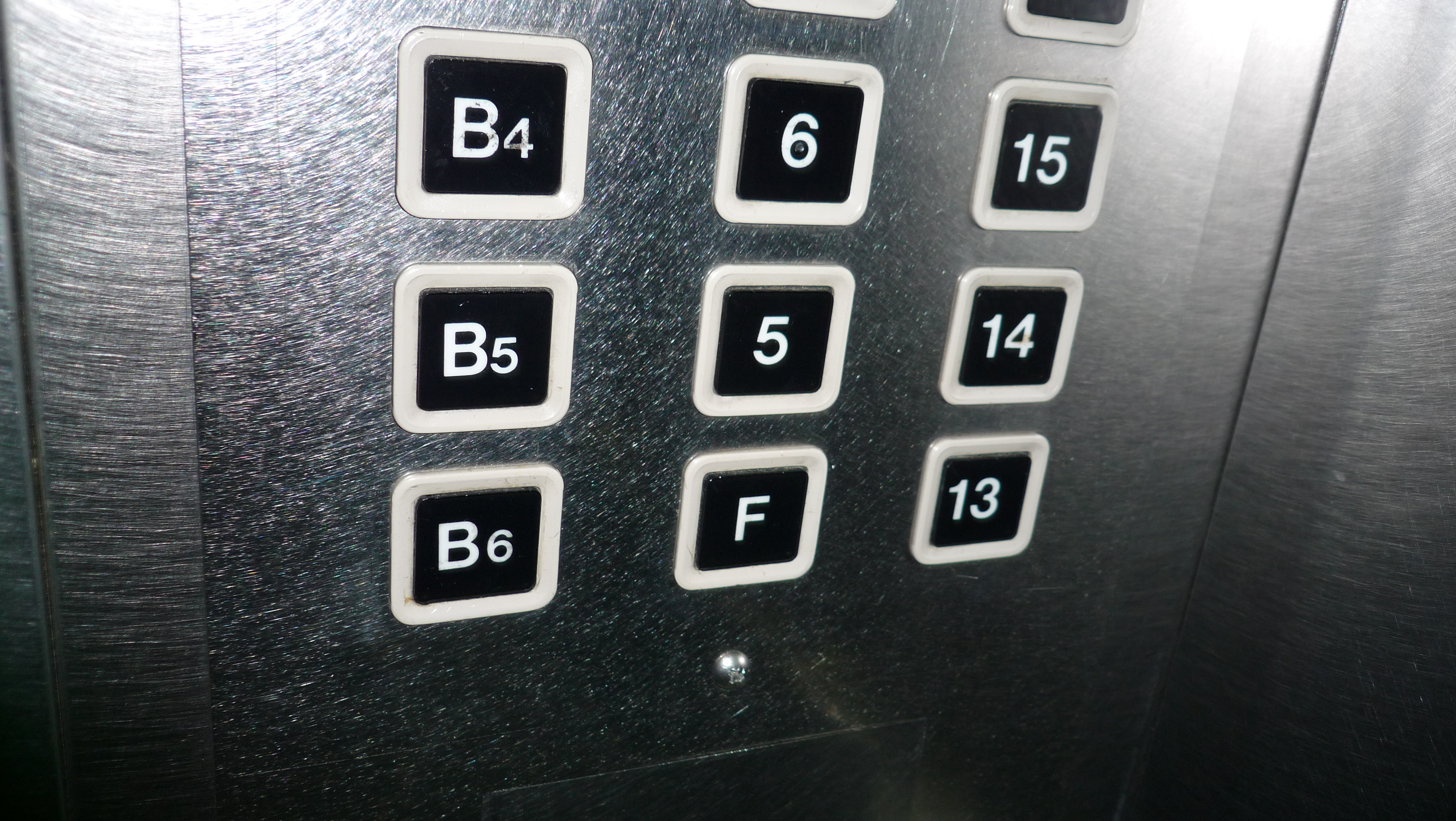
4th floor labelled "F", 13th floor labelled as usual

In South Korea, tetraphobia is less extreme. The number 4 sounds like the hanja for "death" (사) (although Korean has no tones), so the floor number 4 or room number 4 is almost always skipped in hospitals, funeral halls, and similar public buildings. In other buildings, the fourth floor is sometimes labelled "F" (for "Four") instead of "4" in elevators. Apartment numbers containing multiple occurrences of the number 4 (such as 404) are likely to be avoided to an extent that the value of the property is adversely affected. The national railroad, Korail, left out the locomotive number 4444 when numbering a locomotive class from 4401 upwards.

=== Outside Asia ===
Efforts to accommodate tetraphobia-related sensitivities have been seen in Canada, particularly in areas with significant ethnic Chinese populations. Richmond Hill, Ontario banned the number four on new houses in June 2013. Property developers in Vancouver omitted the number from new buildings until October 2015, when the city banned non-sequential numbering schemes.

In several Las Vegas hotels, including the Wynn and Encore, floor numbers 40–49 are skipped for the same reasons they may be omitted in China.

In some Italian regions, such as Tuscany, four is a homophone for coffin.

== Corporate examples ==
=== Nokia ===
The software platform Symbian, used by Finnish telecommunications firm Nokia in their Series 60 platform, avoids releases beginning with 4, as it did when it was EPOC and owned by Psion (there was no Psion Series 4, and there was no 4th edition of S60). This was done "as a polite gesture to Asian customers". Similarly, Nokia did not release any products under the 4xxx series, although some of Nokia's other products do contain the number 4, such as the Series 40 platform, and the Nokia 3410. However, as of the Mobile World Congress 2019 event, the company had announced the Nokia 4.2.

=== SaskTel ===
When area code 306 was nearing exhaustion in 2011, the Canadian Radio-television and Telecommunications Commission originally proposed that the new area code be 474. However, representatives from SaskTel requested that the new area code be 639 instead, to avoid the negative connotations of 4 in Asian cultures. 639 was subsequently approved as the new area code.

=== OnePlus ===
The Chinese smartphone manufacturer OnePlus chose to name its smartphone model after the 3 and 3T the 5, avoiding the number 4.

== Research ==
A 2001 article by authors Phillips et al published in the British Medical Journal reported a study that looked at mortality statistics in the United States over a 25-year period. The authors reported findings that on the fourth day of the month, Asian people were thirteen percent more likely to die of heart failure. In California, Asians were twenty-seven percent more likely to die of a heart attack on that day. The hypothesis purportedly tested in the study was that psychological stress caused by belief in this superstition could indeed trigger deadly heart attacks and other fatal incidents.

Subsequent efforts by other researchers have failed to replicate the findings reported by Phillips and collaborators. One such effort was by researchers who replicated the 2001 study's methods in a Hong Kong Chinese population which did not show evidence consistent with increased cardiac mortality on the 4th, 14th, or 24th days of the month. Another such effort was by Gary Smith, an economist with expertise in debunking improper use of data in statistical analyses. A 2002 article by Smith was published in the same scientific journal as the 2001 article, and details Smith's replication of Phillips's study using the same dataset but more scientifically appropriate statistical comparisons. Smith's reanalysis of the data did not find evidence to support the conclusions drawn in the 2001 study. Furthermore, Smith's review of other scientific publications by Phillips identified inconsistencies in the 2001 study's methodology compared to the author's other published work, where the 2001 study was reported to include only a subset of cardiac deaths compared to work by Phillips on similar populations with similar definitions of cardiac mortality groups.

== See also ==
- 27 club
- Curse of 39
- Faux pas derived from Chinese pronunciation
- Japanese wordplay
- List of phobias, including Numerophobia
- Numbers in Chinese culture
- Triskaidekaphobia, fear or avoidance of the number 13
