= W Hong Kong =

Hotel in West Kowloon, Hong Kong

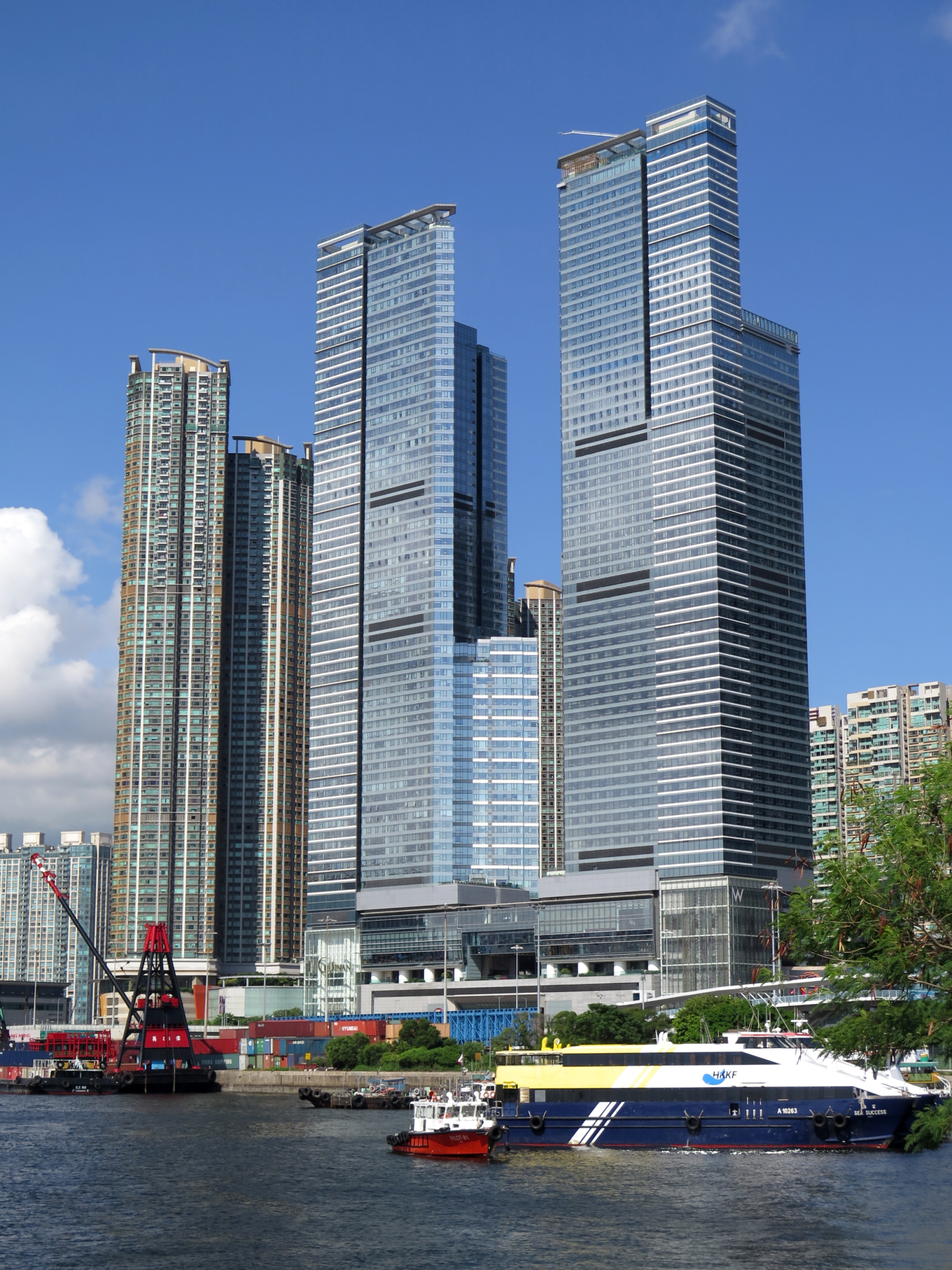
- W Hong Kong located in The Cullinan

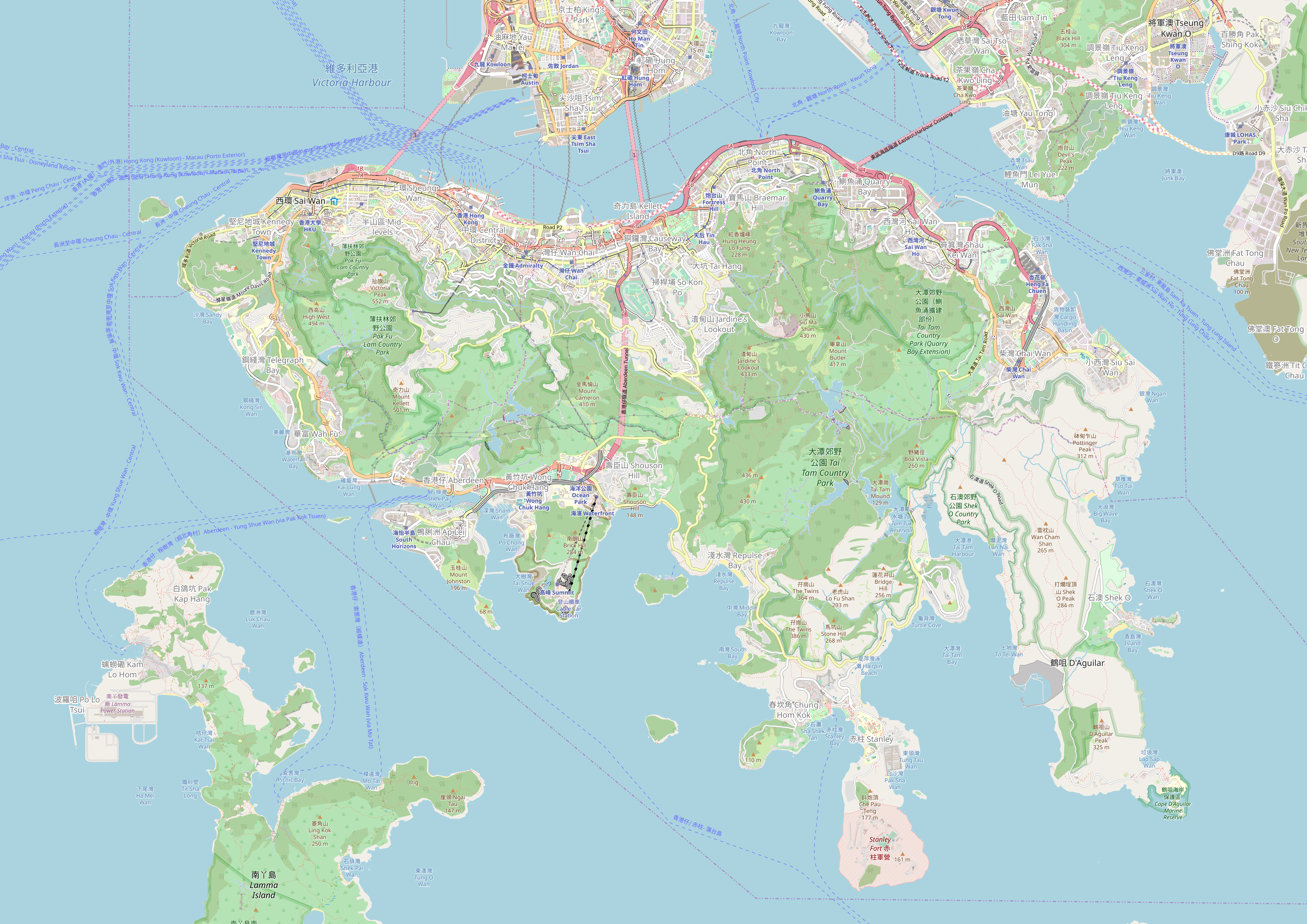
- Location on Hong Kong Island

General information
- Location: 1 Austin Road West, West Kowloon, Hong Kong
- Coordinates: 22°18′19.4″N 114°09′38.8″E
- Opening: 8 August 2008; 17 years ago
- Operator: W Hotels

Technical details
- Floor count: first 25 floors of the second building (right)
- Floor area: 100,000 m^{2} (1,100,000 sq ft)

Other information
- Number of rooms: 393

Website
- www.marriott.com/hotels/travel/hkgwh-w-hong-kong/

W Hong Kong, a W Hotel, is a five-star hotel in Hong Kong, that occupies the first 25 floors of the Sun Hung Kai Properties-owned Cullinan II, Kowloon station, West Kowloon, offering a total of 393 guest rooms, as well as a rooftop swimming pool and the 'WooBar'. The W Hong Kong started its trial operations on 8 August 2008, and launched its official operations in January 2009.

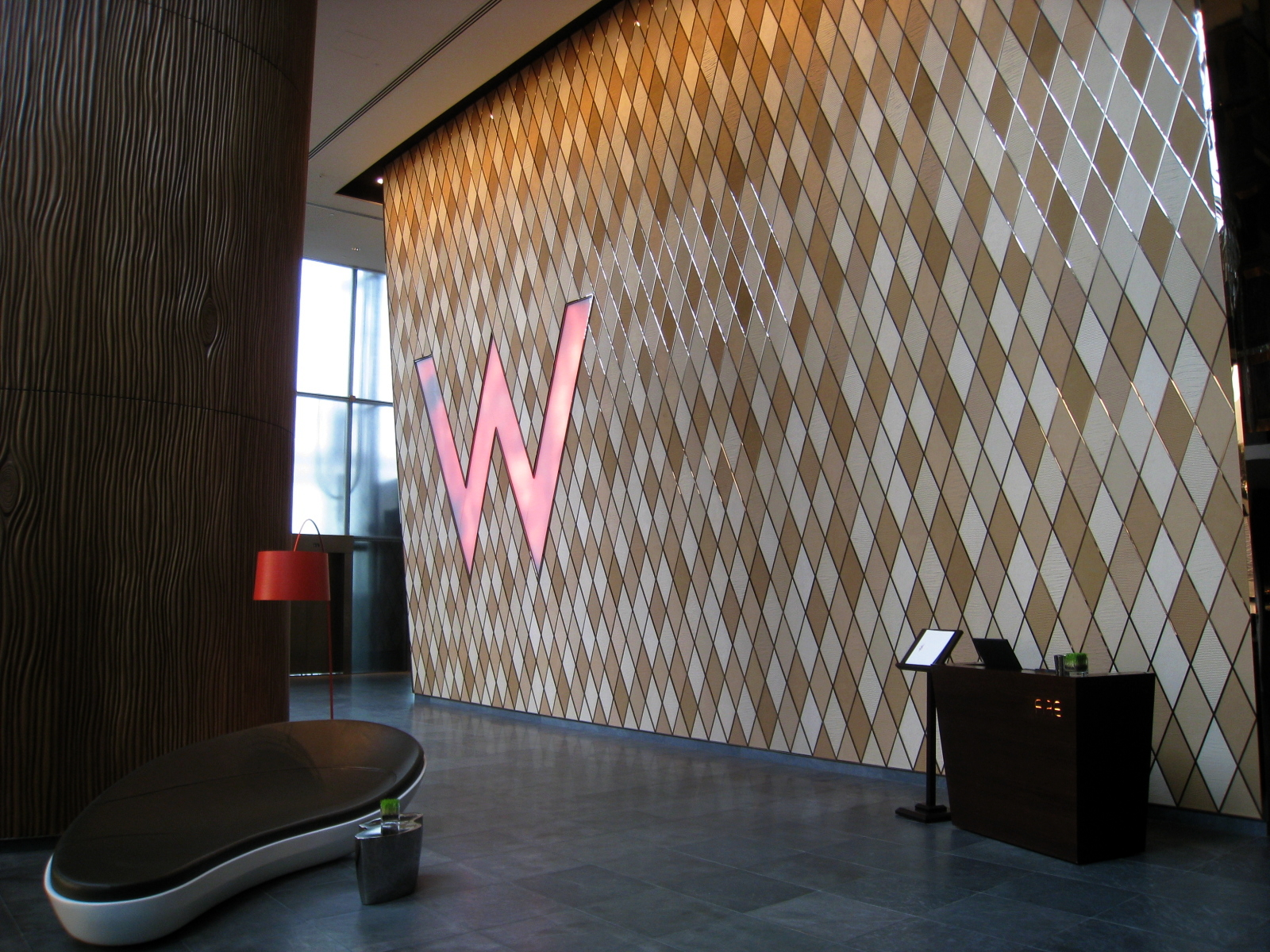
Lobby at ground floor

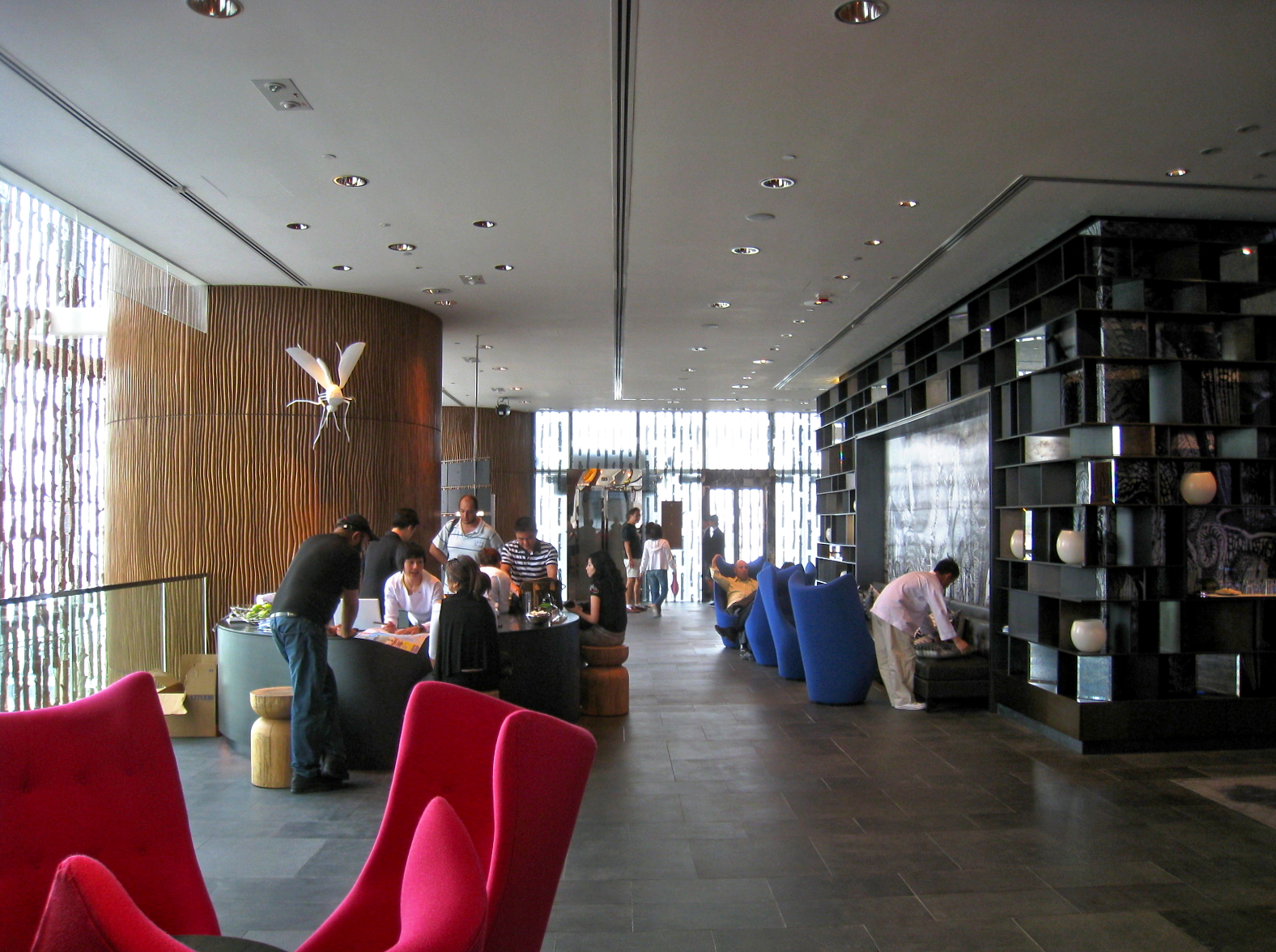
Lobby at the sixth floor

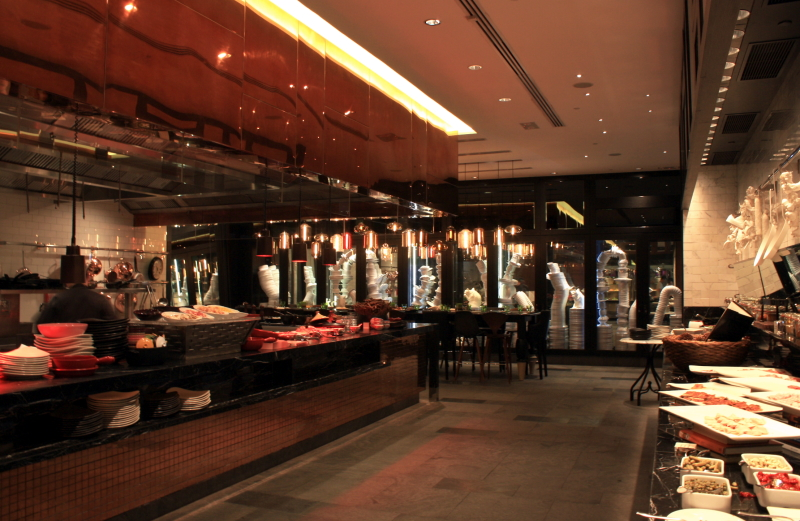
Open-style kitchen in "Kitchen" Restaurant

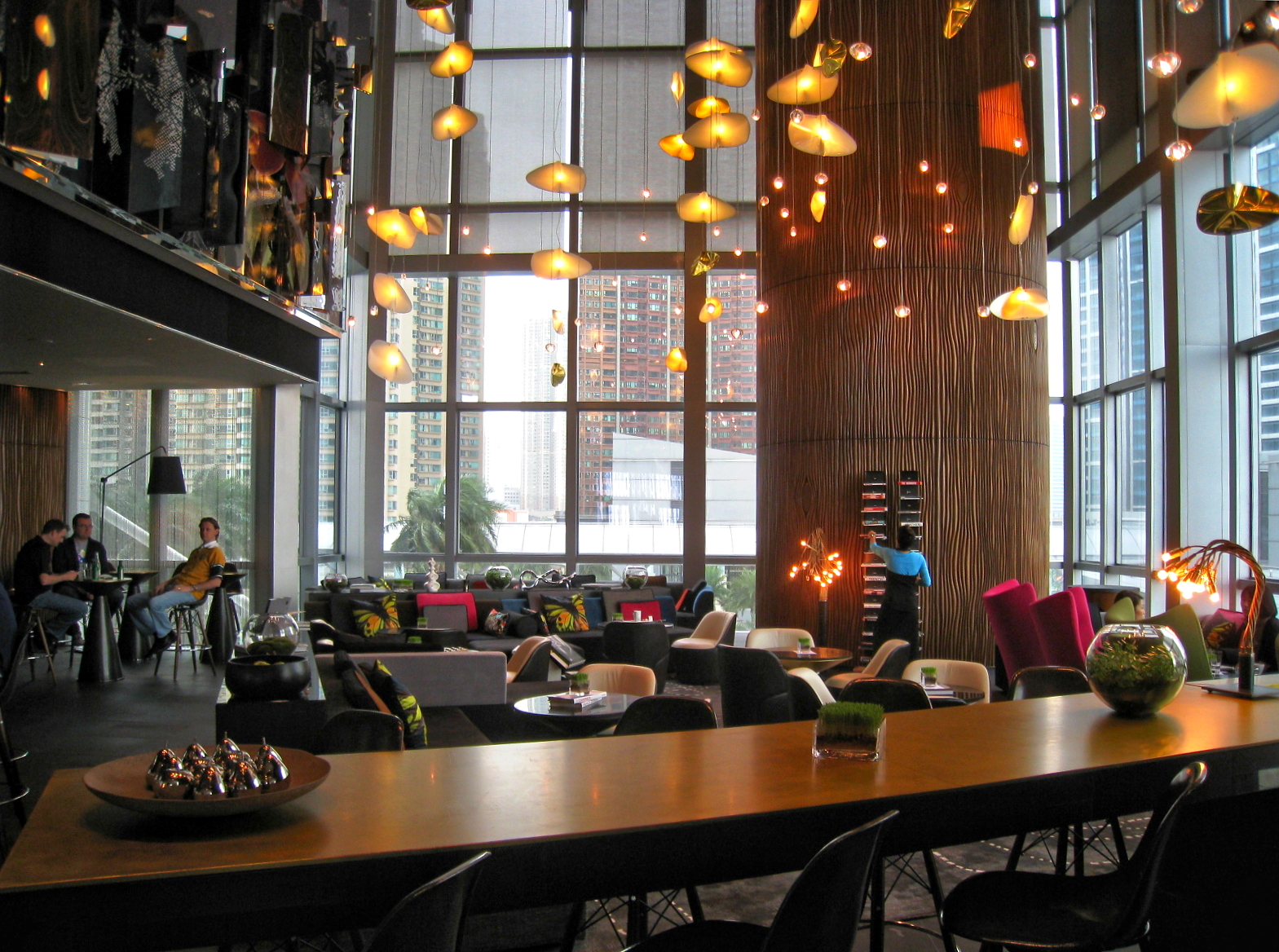
Bar at the sixth floor

== See also ==
- W Hotels
- Marriott International
- Airport Express (MTR)
- Elements, Hong Kong
- The Cullinan
- The Ritz-Carlton, Hong Kong
- Union Square (Hong Kong)
- Sun Hung Kai Properties
- Hong Kong International Airport
- Kowloon station (MTR)
