= International Commerce Centre =

Tallest building in Hong Kong

- 環球貿易廣場

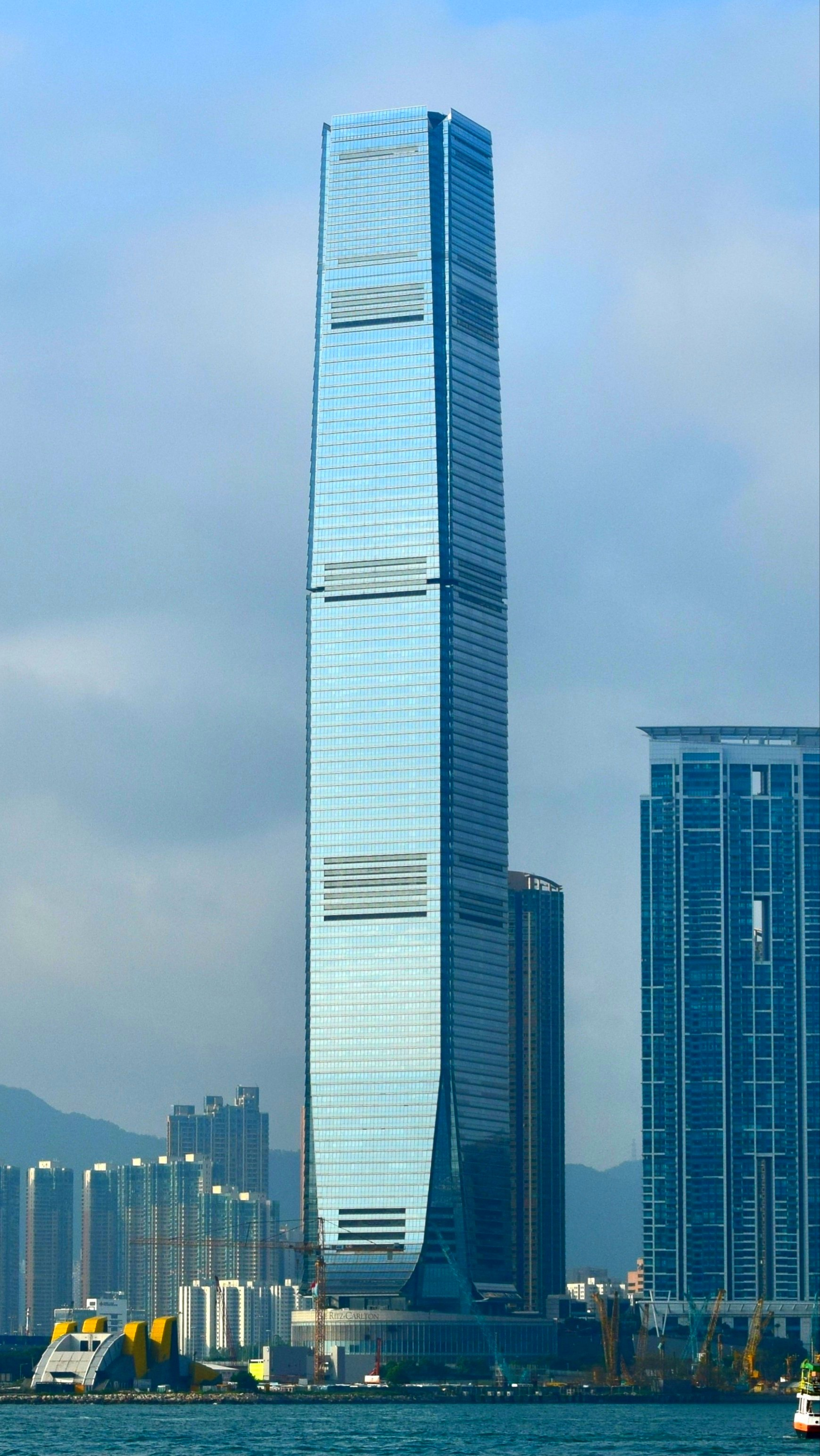
- International Commerce Centre in 2016

General information
- Status: Completed
- Type: Commercial offices, hotel
- Location: 1 Austin Road West, Kowloon, Hong Kong
- Construction started: 2002; 24 years ago
- Completed: 2010; 16 years ago
- Operator: Harbour Vantage

Height
- Architectural: 484 m (1,588 ft)
- Tip: 484 m (1,588 ft)

Technical details
- Floor count: 108 above ground

Design and construction
- Architect: Kohn Pedersen Fox Associates
- Developer: Sun Hung Kai Properties Limited
- Structural engineer: Arup
- Main contractor: China State Construction Engineering Corporation; Sanfield Building Contractors Limited

The International Commerce Centre (Chinese: 環球貿易廣場; Jyutping: waan4kau4 mau6jik6 gwong2coeng4) is a 108-storey, 484 m (1,588 ft) supertall skyscraper in West Kowloon, Hong Kong, located atop the Elements mall and near two MTR Stations (Kowloon and Austin Station). It is the world's 13th tallest building by height, 10th tallest by number of floors, and Hong Kong's tallest, as well as the only building in the city with over 100 storeys. The official height is 484 m (1,588 ft), which includes the 6 m (20 ft) tall parapets on the roof. It was the fourth tallest building in Asia, and the fourth tallest building in the world, when it was completed in 2010.

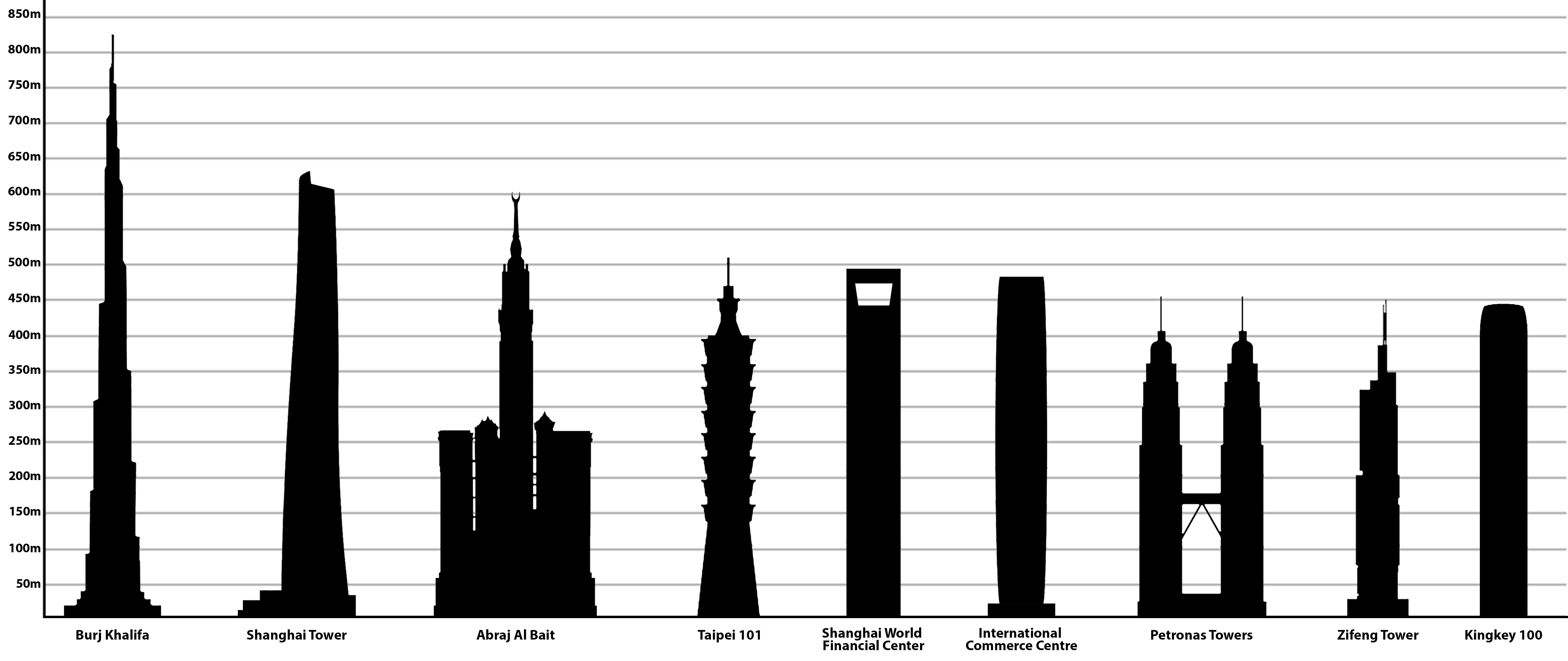
International Commerce Centre compared with other tallest buildings in Asia.

The south side of the building faces Victoria Harbour.

== History ==
The height was scaled back from earlier plans due to regulations that did not allow buildings to be taller than the surrounding mountains. The original proposal for the building was called Kowloon Station Phase 7 and would have been 574 m (1,883 ft) tall with 108 floors, which would've made it the tallest building in China.

The tower was designed by the American architectural firm Kohn Pedersen Fox Associates (KPF) in association with Wong & Ouyang. It was built by China State Construction Engineering Corporation and Sanfield building constructor limited, a construction subsidiary of Sun Hung Kai Properties Limited.

Construction work was temporarily halted on 13 September 2009, due to a lift shaft accident that killed six workers.

== Floor count ==
The top floor is numbered as "118". However, levels with "4" in the last digit were skipped because it sounds like "death" in Cantonese and Mandarin (tetraphobia), similar to Western superstition about the number 13 (triskaidekaphobia). As a result, the remaining storeys' floor numbers are also increased.

Except for level 3, 103 and 113, floor numbers with "3" in the last digit were also skipped, floor numbers 5, 6, 7, 26, 28, 29 and 105 were skipped as well for unknown reasons. They are currently replaced by floor numbers with "M" & "R", which stand for "Mechanical" and "Refuge". Although the floor numbers are missing, they still show on the elevator's screen of Sky100 and Skydining 101 while going up and down.

28 floor numbers were skipped: 4, 5, 6, 7, 13, 14, 23, 24, 26, 28, 29, 33, 34, 43, 44, 53, 54, 63, 64, 73, 74, 83, 84, 93, 94, 104, 105, 114

18 floor numbers were added: UG, M1-1, M1-2, M1-3, M1-5, R1, R2, M2-1, M2-2, R3, M3-1, M3-2, R4, M4-1, M4-2, M4-3, M5, M6

Level	Tower level	Type	Elevation
118	108	The Ritz-Carlton (swimming pool, fitness centre & Ozone bar)	476 m (1,562 ft)
M6	107	Mechanical	
117	106	The Ritz-Carlton (presidential suite)	
116	105	The Ritz-Carlton (spa & club lounge)	465 m (1,526 ft)
115	104	The Ritz-Carlton (guest rooms)	
113	103	The Ritz-Carlton (guest rooms)	
112	102	The Ritz-Carlton (guest rooms)	
111	101	The Ritz-Carlton (guest rooms)	
110	100	The Ritz-Carlton (guest rooms)	
109	99	The Ritz-Carlton (guest rooms)	
108	98	The Ritz-Carlton (guest rooms)	
107	97	The Ritz-Carlton (guest rooms)	
106	96	The Ritz-Carlton (guest rooms)	
M5	95	Mechanical	
103	94	The Ritz-Carlton (reception lobby, Café 103 & buffet)	425 m (1,394 ft)
102	93	The Ritz-Carlton (dining)	
M4-3	92	The Ritz-Carlton (staff only) / Mechanical	
M4-2	91	Mechanical	
M4-1	90	Mechanical	
R4	89	Refuge	
101	88	Skydining 101	399 m (1,309 ft)
100	87	Sky100 & Café 100	393 m (1,289 ft)
99	86	UBS	
98	85	UBS	
97	84	UBS	
96	83	Office	
95	82	UBS	
92	81	UBS	
91	80	UBS	
90	79	UBS	
89	78	UBS	
88	77	UBS	
87	76	UBS	
86	75	IWG plc	
85	74	IWG plc	
82	73	IWG plc	
81	72	Office	
80	71	Office	
79	70	Office	
78	69	Office	
M3-2	68	Mechanical	
M3-1	67	Mechanical	
R3	66	Refuge	
77	65	Office	
76	64	Office	
75	63	Office	
72	62	Office	
71	61	Office	
70	60	Office	
69	59	Office	
68	58	Office	
67	57	Office	
66	56	Office	
65	55	Office	
62	54	Office	
61	53	Deutsche Bank	
60	52	Deutsche Bank	
59	51	Deutsche Bank	
58	50	Deutsche Bank	
57	49	Deutsche Bank	
56	48	Deutsche Bank	
55	47	Deutsche Bank	
52	46	Deutsche Bank	
51	45	Deutsche Bank	
50	44	Office	
49	43	Sky lobby	
48	42	Sky lobby	
M2-2	41	Mechanical	
M2-1	40	Mechanical	
R2	39	Refuge	
47	38	Morgan Stanley	
46	37	Morgan Stanley	
45	36	Morgan Stanley	
42	35	Morgan Stanley	
41	34	Morgan Stanley	
40	33	Morgan Stanley	
39	32	Morgan Stanley	
38	31	Morgan Stanley	
37	30	Morgan Stanley	
36	29	Morgan Stanley	
35	28	Morgan Stanley	
32	27	Morgan Stanley	
31	26	Morgan Stanley	
30	25	Morgan Stanley	
27	24	Office	
25	23	Office	
22	22	Office	
21	21	Office	
20	20	SPACE (fitness centre)	
19	19	Office	
18	18	Office	
17	17	Office	
16	16	Office	
15	15	Office	
12	14	Office	
R1	13	Refuge	
M1-5	12	Mechanical	
M1-3	11	Mechanical	
M1-2	10	Mechanical	
M1-1	9	Mechanical	
11	8	Office	
10	7	Office	
9	6	The Ritz-Carlton (entrance), office lobby & podium floor	
8	5	The Ritz-Carlton (entrance), office lobby & podium floor	
⬆ ICC ⬆ ⬇ Elements ⬇
3	4	The Ritz-Carlton (ballroom) & lobbies (office & Skydining 101)	25 m (82 ft)
2	3	Sky100 (tickets & entrance) & skyway to WKCD	
1	2	-	
UG	1	-	
G	G	Entrance (Nga Cheung Road), bus stop & loading dock	
B1	B1	Carpark	
B2	B2	Carpark	
B3	B3	Carpark	
B4	B4	Carpark	

== Sky100 & Skydining 101 ==
An elevator ascending at speeds of 32 kilometres per hour (20 mph) for 60-seconds goes to the 393-metre high indoor observation deck Sky100, on level 100. It is the 2nd highest observation deck in Hong Kong, after outdoor Sky Terrace 428 on The Peak Tower. It opens from 1000 to 2030 daily (last entry at 2000), but depends on the weather and sometimes for private only, the admission fee of aged 12 to 64 is $198. The Hong Kong action film, Cold War, which stars Aaron Kwok and Tony Leung Ka-fai as the main character, was also filmed here in 2011.

Skydining 101 (Inakaya, Odyssée, The Sky Boss and The Kitin) are on level 101, at 399 m (1,309 ft).

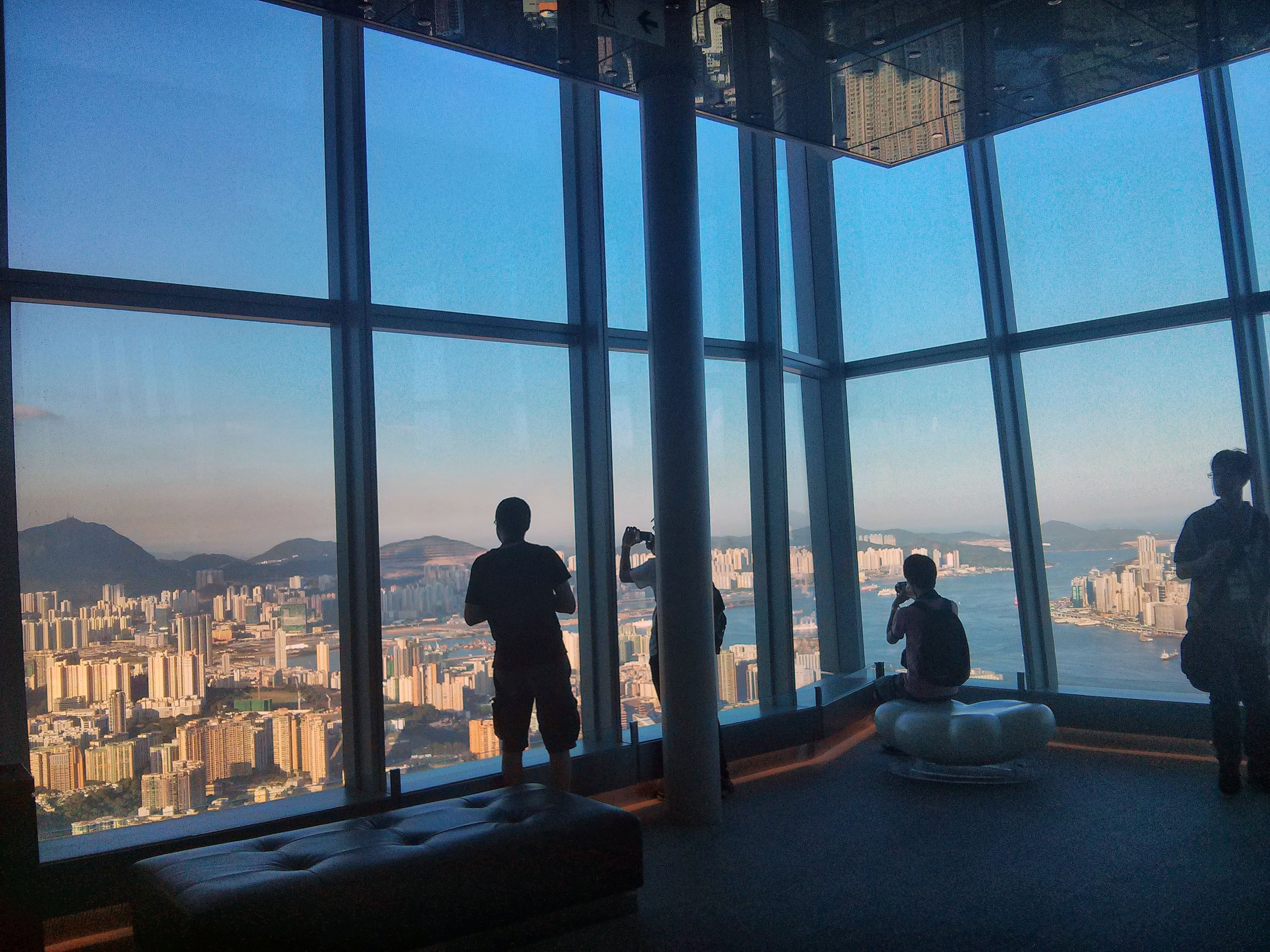
Sky100

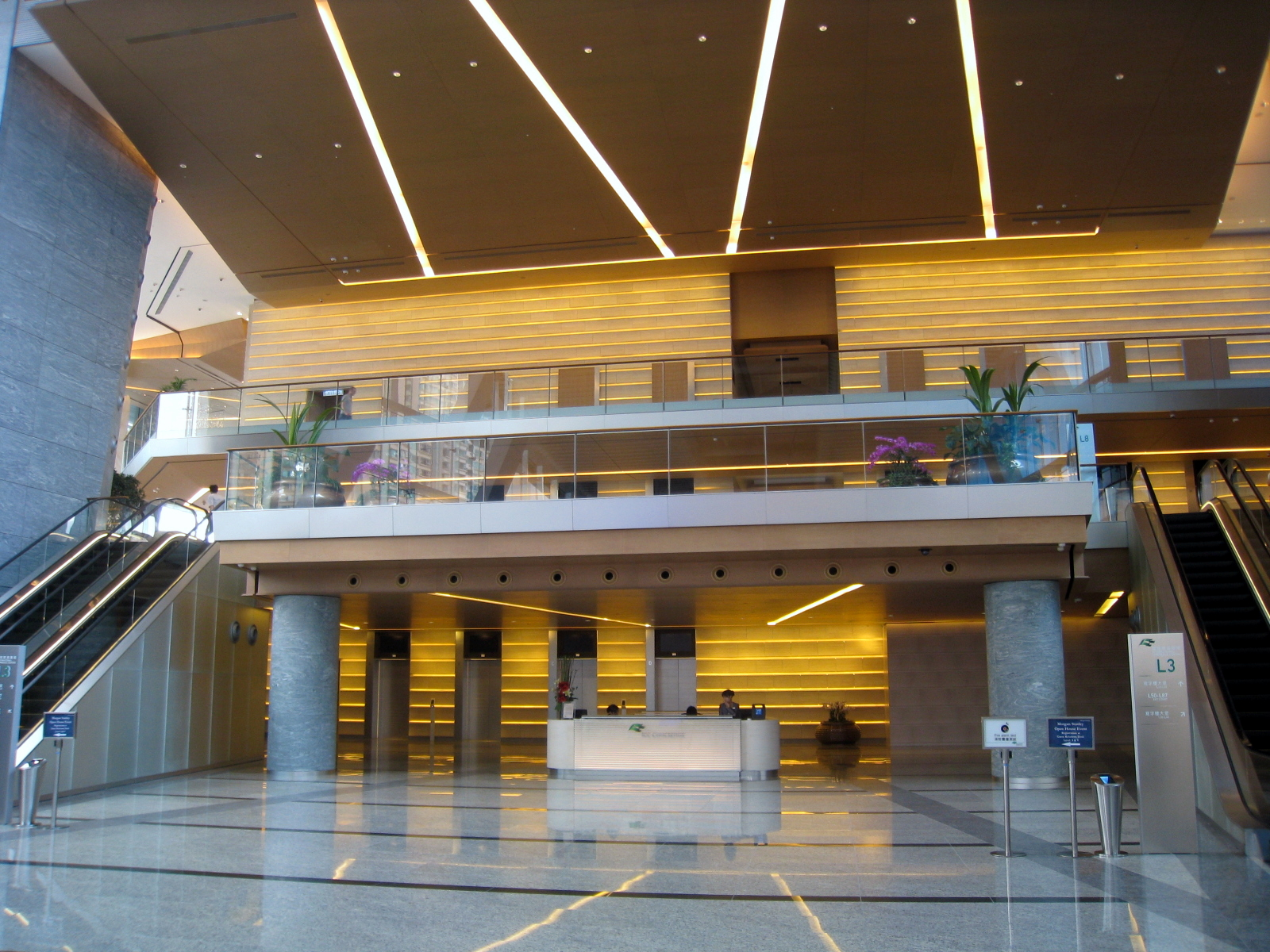
Office lobby with the passage to Skydining 101

== The Ritz-Carlton, Hong Kong ==
A five-star hotel, The Ritz-Carlton, Hong Kong occupies floors 102 to 118. According to Guinness World Records, the "world's highest swimming pool in a building" is on the 118th floor at 468.8 meters. The 2,800 m^{2} (30,000 sq ft) Presidential Suite, which costs 100,000 HKD per night, is on the 117th floor. The hotel's arrival lobby is on the 9th floor where guest are greeted by receptionists and taken to express elevators. The express elevators take guests 425 m (1,394 ft) above the ground in 50 seconds to the main lobby on the 103rd floor. Guest keycards are required to use the hotel elevators to access the hotel rooms on floors 104-117 and the swimming pool and gym on floor 118. An exclusive Club lounge for guests staying in club rooms and suites is located on floor 116 along with the spa. Three restaurants, Tosca, an Italian restaurant, a Chinese restaurant and the main restaurant are all located one floor below reception on floor 102.

== The ICC Light and Music Show ==
The LED light show set a new Guinness World Record for the “largest light and sound show on a single building” using a total of 50,000 m^{2} on two facades of the ICC. The Show is designed by the lighting design supervisor, Hirohito Totsune, who already designed the lighting system of the Tokyo Skytree. It creates a theme and story line by using lights and music elements, similar to "A Symphony of Lights" in Victoria Harbour.

== Transport (daily) ==
All-day:
Mass Transit Railway (MTR): Airport Express Tung Chung line Kowloon station / Tuen Ma line Austin station / High-speed rail Hong Kong West Kowloon station

Kowloon Motor Bus (KMB): 8, 11, 95, 203E, 215X, 260X, 269B, 280X, 281A, 296D, 904, 905, 914, 960, 961, 968, 978, W2

City Bus (CTB): 50, 904, 905, 914, 930, 930X, 952, 962X, 969, 970, 970X, 971, 973, A10, A11, A12, A22, E11 (E11A), E23 (E23A)

(Routes in red refers to "jointly operated"!)

Public light bus (minibus): 26, 74, 74S, 77M, CX1

Overnight:
City Bus (CTB): N50, N930, N952, N962, N969, NA11, NA12

== Gallery ==
A simplified map of Union Square showing the location of the International Commerce Centre

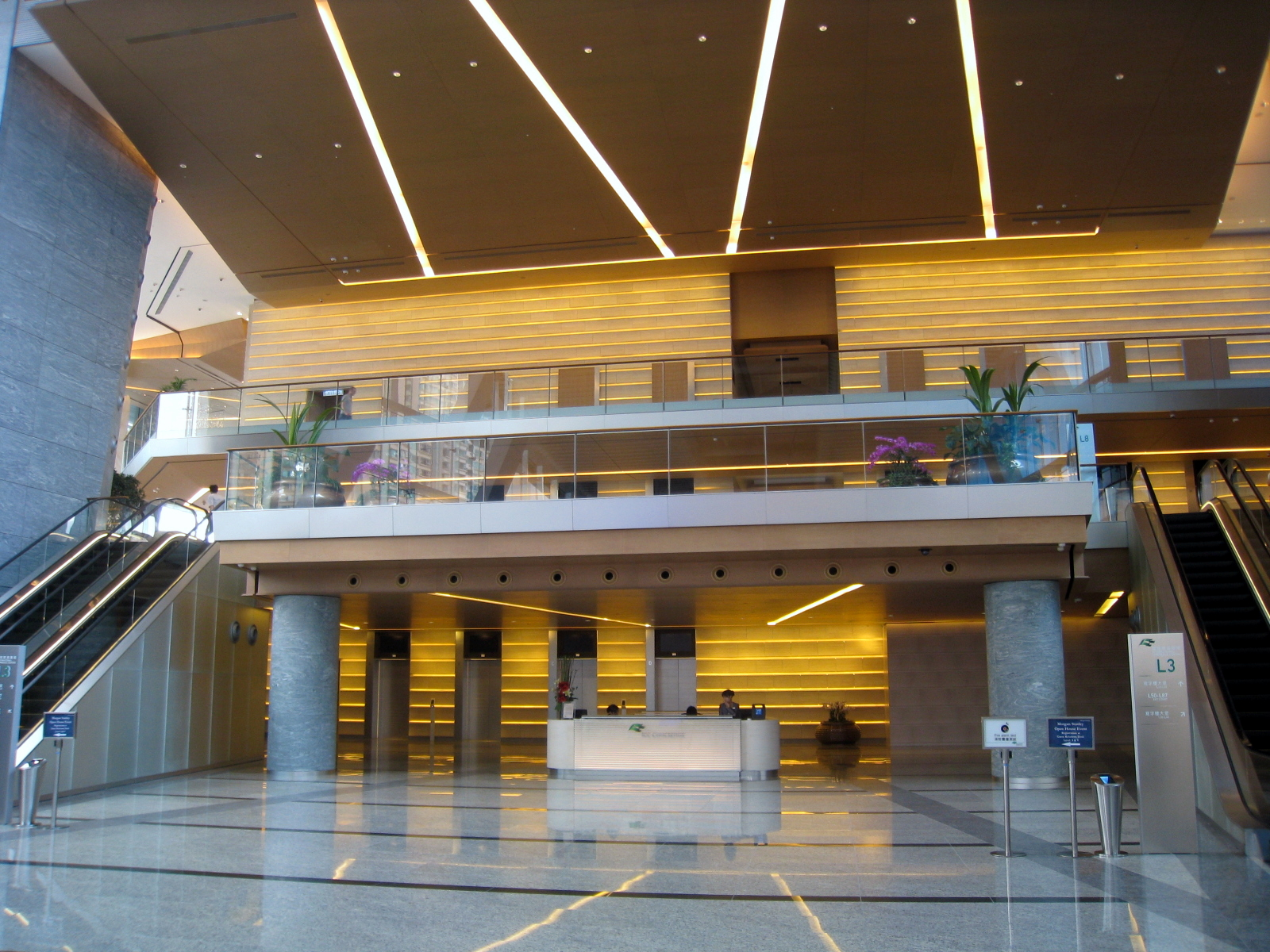
Office lobby in November 2008

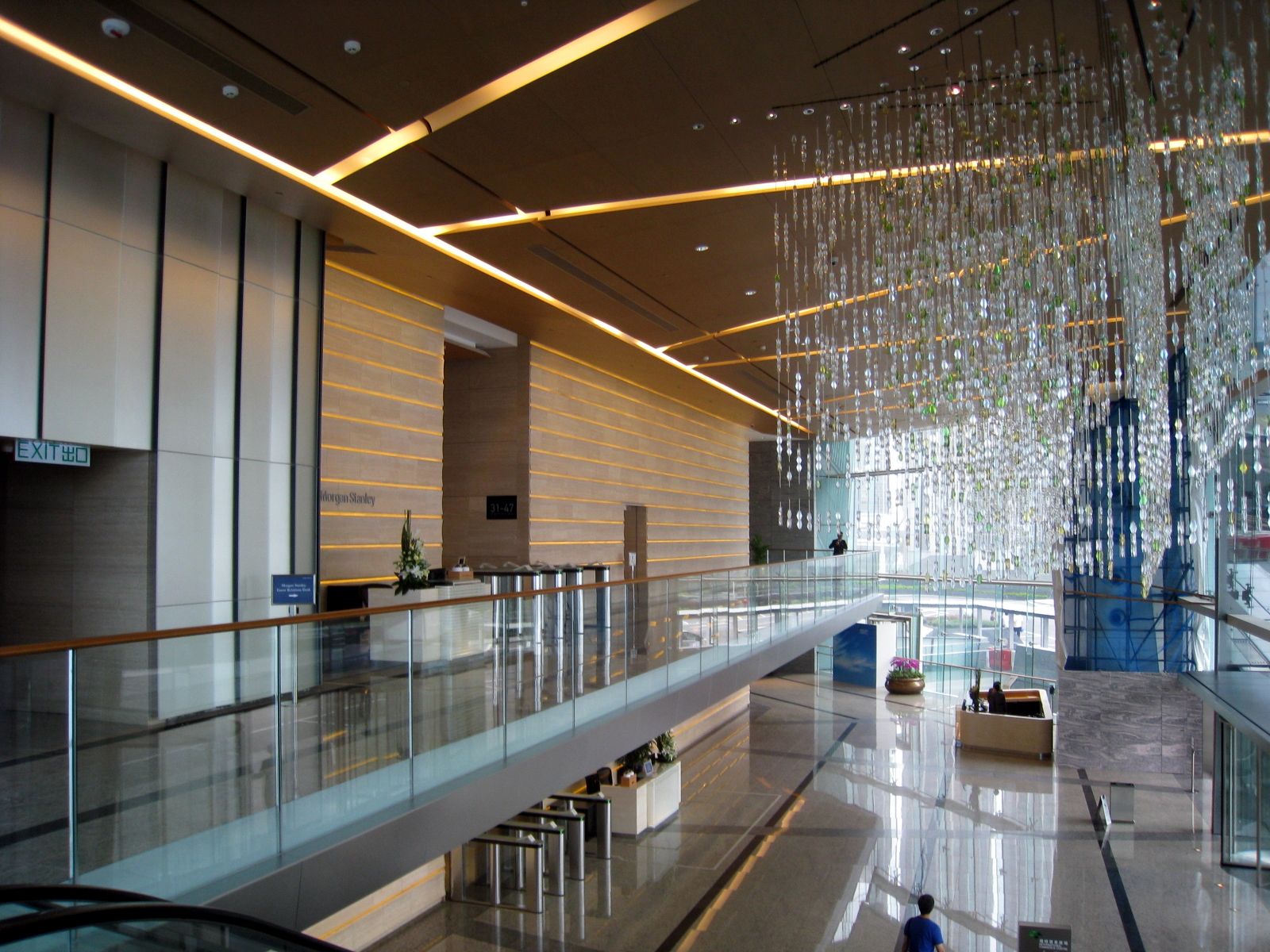
Office lobby void in November 2008

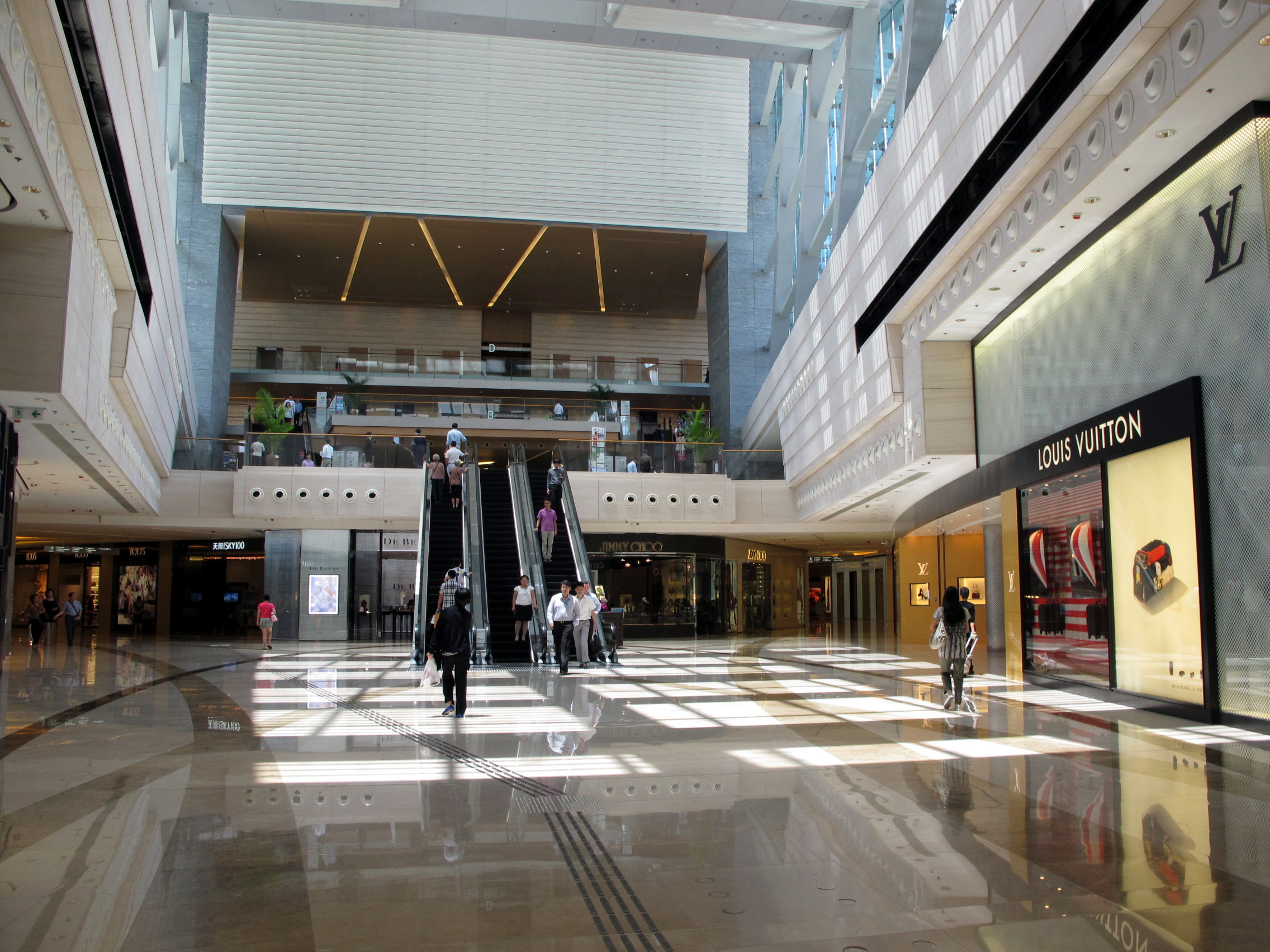
Access from Elements shopping mall in August 2013

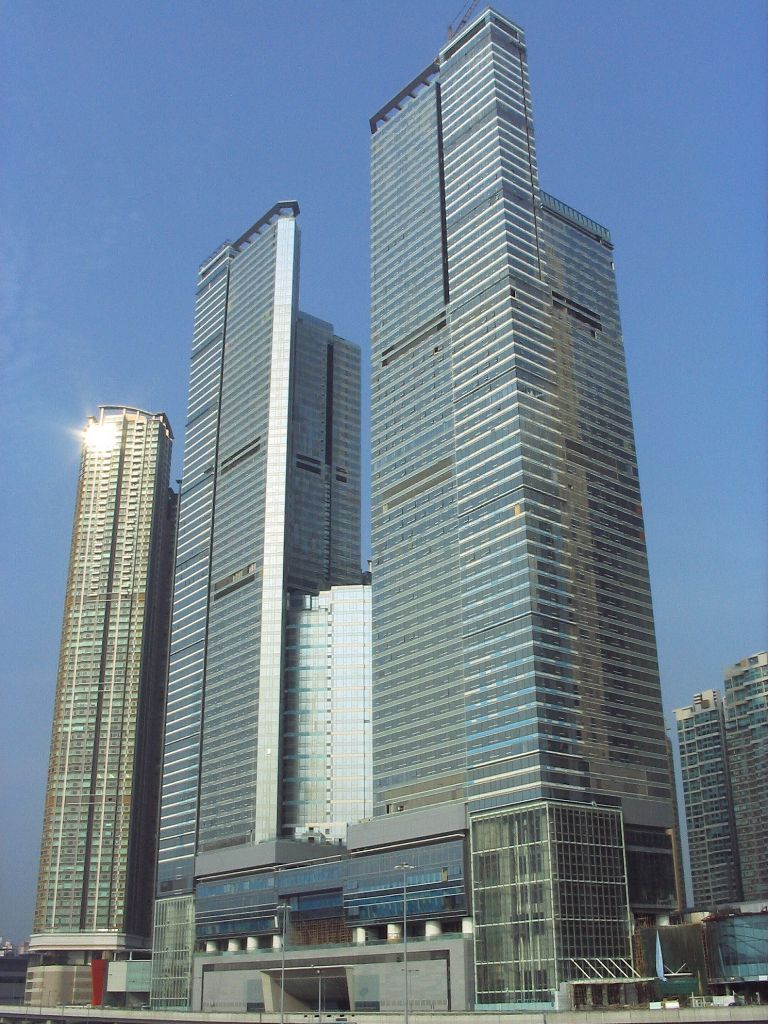
Residential complex The Cullinan and W Hong Kong hotel are located alongside the ICC. Taken in April 2007.

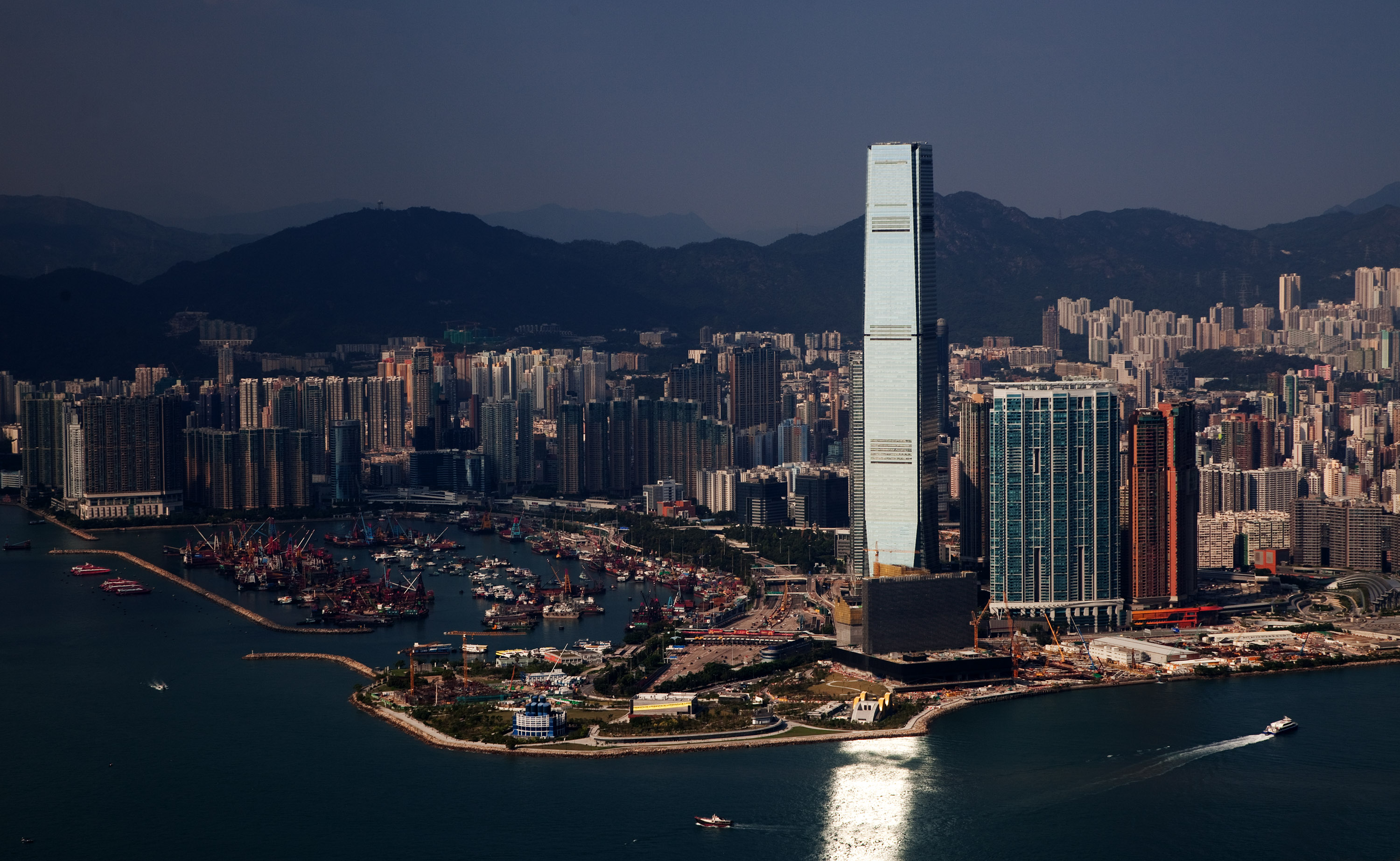
Viewed from Victoria Peak, with the Yau Ma Tei Typhoon Shelter visible.

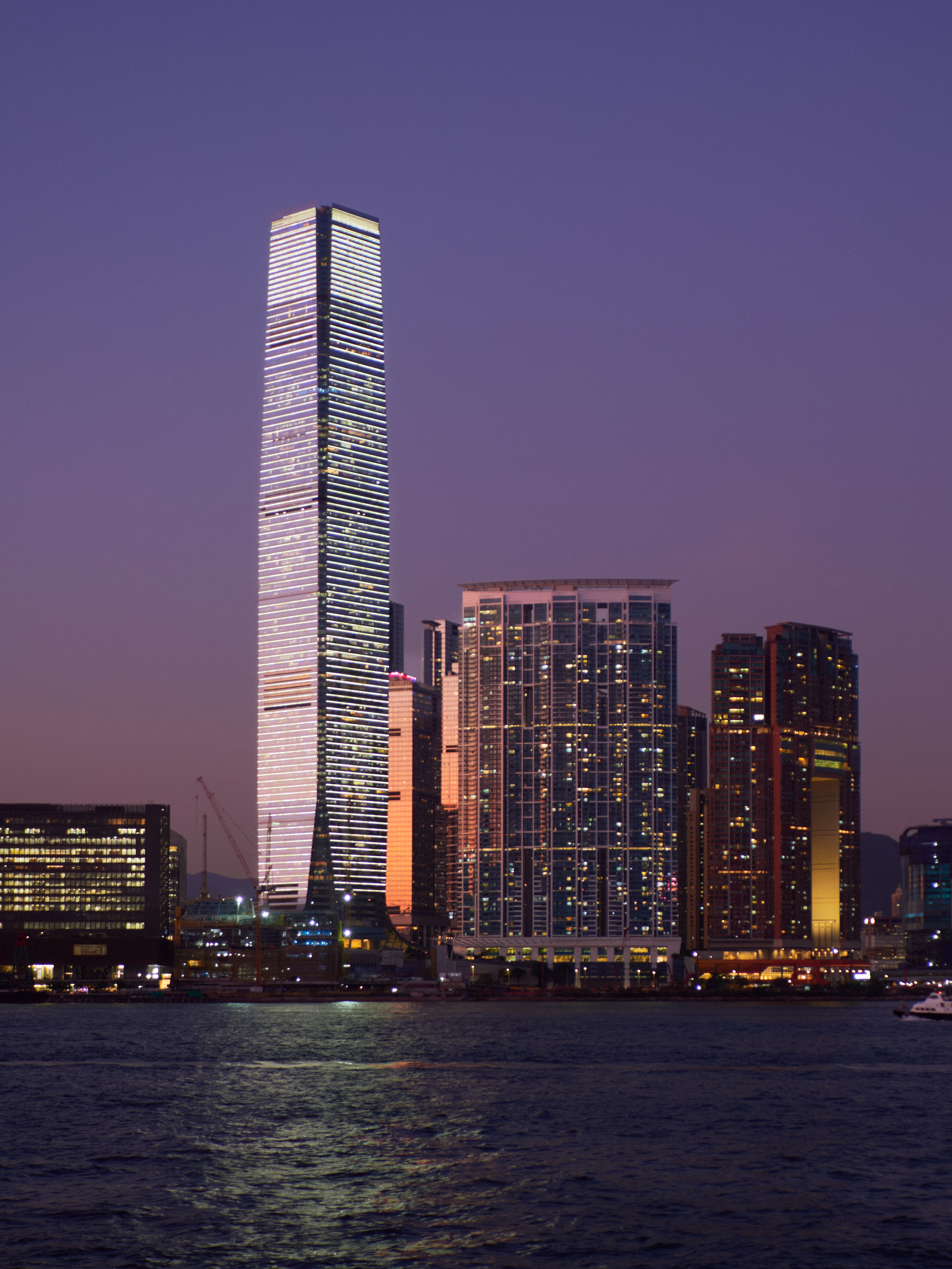
ICC dominating the West Kowloon skyline

== See also ==
- List of tallest buildings in Hong Kong
- List of tallest buildings in China
- List of tallest buildings
