= Tianxi =

Tianxi was a Chinese era name used by several emperors of China. It may refer to:

- Tianxi (天璽; 276), used by Sun Hao, emperor of Eastern Wu
- Tianxi (天璽; 399–401), used by Duan Ye, king of Northern Liang
- Tianxi (天禧; 1017–1021), used by Emperor Zhenzong of the Song dynasty
- Tianxi (天禧; 1178–1218), used by Yelü Zhilugu, emperor of Qara Khitai (Western Liao)

It also refers to The Cullinan (天璽), a skyscraper in Hong Kong.
