= Sky100 =

Observation deck in Kowloon, Hong Kong

Coordinates: 22.303392°N 114.160169°E

- 天際100

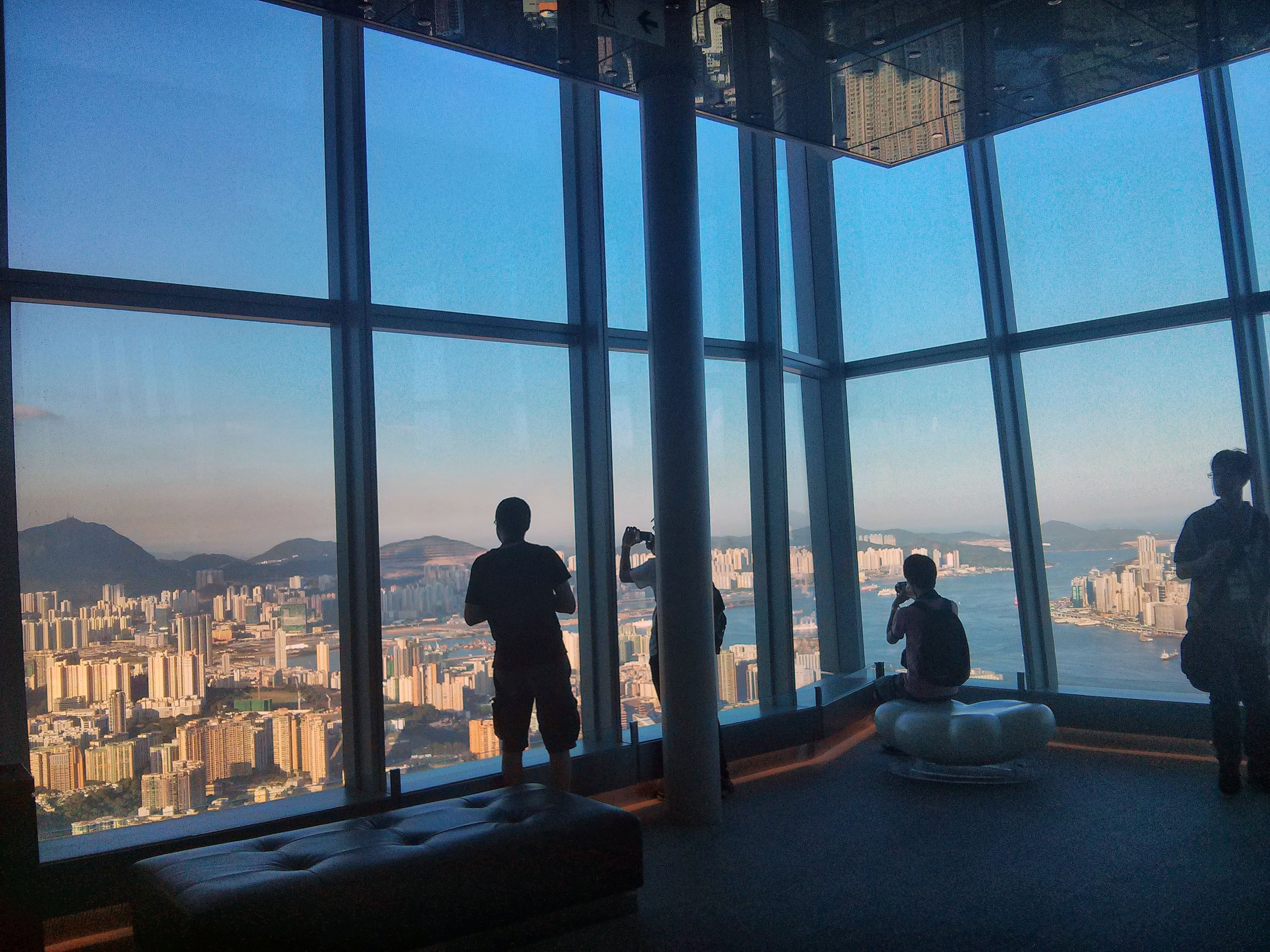
- Sky100 observation deck

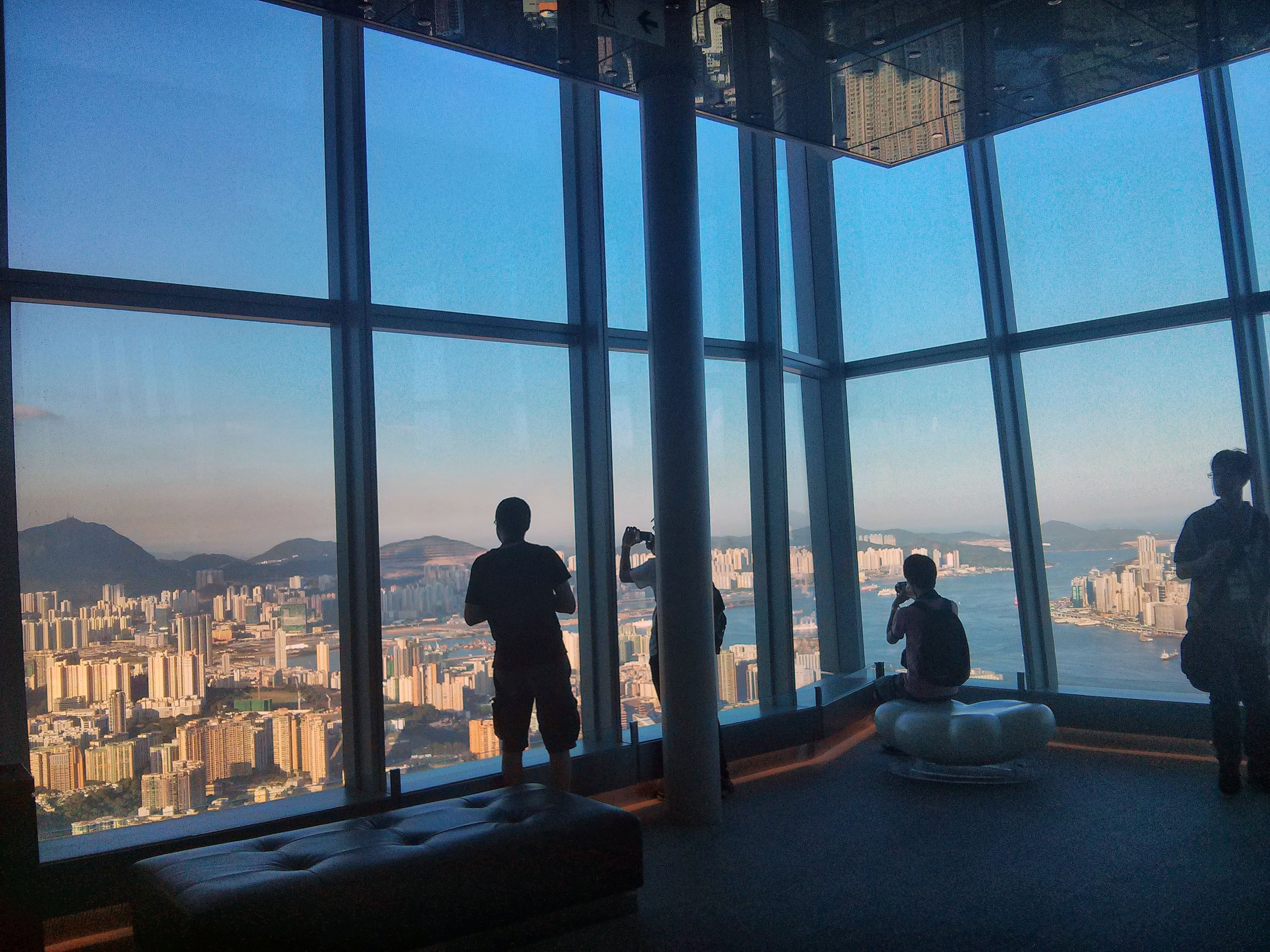
Interior of Sky100 observation deck

Sky100 (Chinese: 天際100) is a 360-degree indoor observation deck on the 100th floor of the International Commerce Centre, in West Kowloon, Hong Kong, near Kowloon station. The deck offers views of Hong Kong Island, Victoria Harbour, the Kowloon Peninsula and Tai Mo Shan in the background.

Sky100 is located two floors below The Ritz-Carlton, Hong Kong. Visitors reach the observation deck using high-speed lifts, which travel from the entrance on the second floor to the 100th floor in 60 seconds.

== History ==
Sun Hung Kai Properties held a naming contest for the new observation deck. Both the English and Chinese name were selected among 3,000 entries in May 2010. Sky100 opened on 17 April 2011.

== Facilities ==
Aside from the view of Hong Kong, Sky100 contains several other attractions including a Paris-style eatery called Café 100 on the west side of the observation deck. Other features include a virtual reality (VR) attraction, augmented reality photo-taking, and a photo booth.

Sky100's Advanced Telescope provides "sunny day setting" and pre-recorded views from bright days, and on-screen indicators point to landmarks. Other settings include night views and fireworks. Interactive touch screens dot the deck, offering facts, tips and an itinerary planner.

== Race to ICC-100 ==
Since 2012, Sky100 has also served as the finish point for the annual "Race to ICC-100—SHKP Vertical Run for the Chest", organised by Sun Hung Kai Properties (Developer of the International Commerce Centre) and The Community Chest of Hong Kong. The race begins at Level 8 and winds its way up the building's staircases to Sky100. The event is normally held in early December.
