= The Ritz-Carlton, Hong Kong =

Hotel in Hong Kong

- 香港麗思卡爾頓酒店
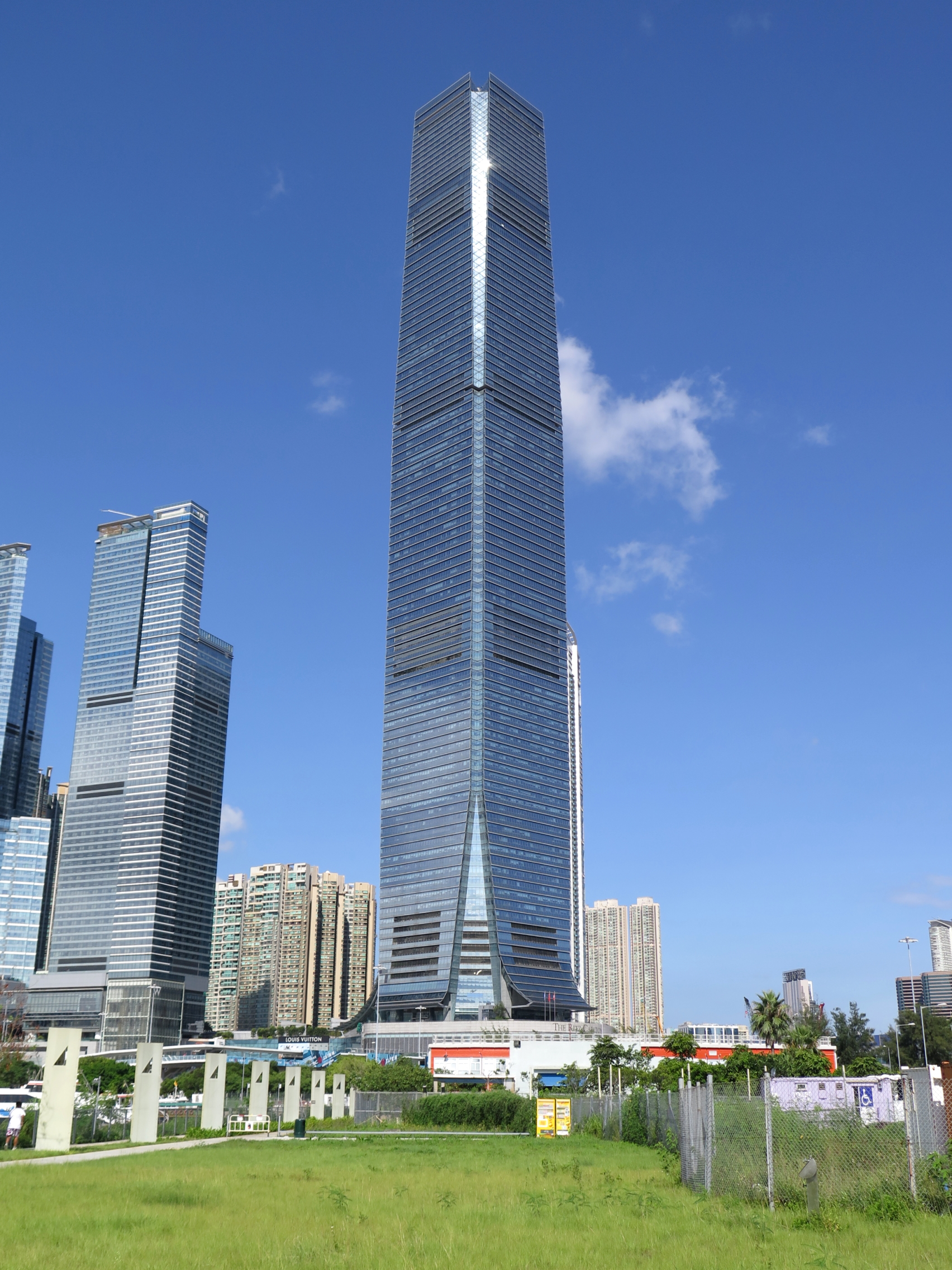
- The hotel at the ICC

General information
- Location: Level 3 to 9 & M4-3 to 118, International Commerce Centre, 1 Austin Road West, West Kowloon, Tsim Sha Tsui, Hong Kong

Website
- The Ritz-Carlton, Hong Kong

The Ritz-Carlton, Hong Kong is one of the highest hotels in the world and the highest five-star hotel in Hong Kong, located on the top floors of the International Commerce Centre which is the tallest building in Hong Kong. The Ritz-Carlton is a brand of the American company Marriott International. It was the world's highest hotel when opened in March 2011, until it was surpassed in 2020 by Shanghai Tower.

== History ==
=== First hotel ===
The first hotel to carry the name The Ritz-Carlton Hong Kong was located in Central, Hong Kong on Chater Road. It opened in August 1993 and closed on 31 January 2008. It was demolished in 2009 and the CCB Tower was constructed on the site. At the time, it was the sixth tallest voluntarily demolished building and as of 2026 is the sixteenth.

=== Current hotel ===
The current hotel carrying that name opened within the International Commerce Centre tower on 29 March 2011. Its interior lighting was designed by British lighting designer Sally Storey.

== Features ==
The Ritz-Carlton, Hong Kong is considered to have some of the best hotel views in the world.

It takes 80 seconds to the reception lobby and Café 103 on level 103 at 425 m from level 9; another coffee zone is called Café 100, located on the west side of Sky100 on level 100.

Guest keycards are required to use the hotel elevators to access the hotel rooms on level 106 to 117.

The world's highest presidential suite is situated on supertall level 117, covering an area of 366 m^{2} (3,940 sq ft), with a 270-degree, floor-to-ceiling city view of Hong Kong Island, Victoria Harbour, and Kowloon Peninsula.

An exclusive club lounge for guests staying in club rooms and suites along with the spa on level 116 at an elevation of 465 m (1,526 ft).

According to Guinness World Records, the hotel has the "world's highest swimming pool in a building", 468.8 meters from the ground on the 118th floor.

The Michelin-dining can be experienced on level 102. A one-starred restaurant with Italian cuisine, Tosca di Angelo, is presided over by Sicilian chef Angelo Aglianó. A Chinese restaurant, Tin Lung Heen, has had two Michelin stars since 2013. It is led by culinary director Paul Lau Ping-lui.

== Gallery ==
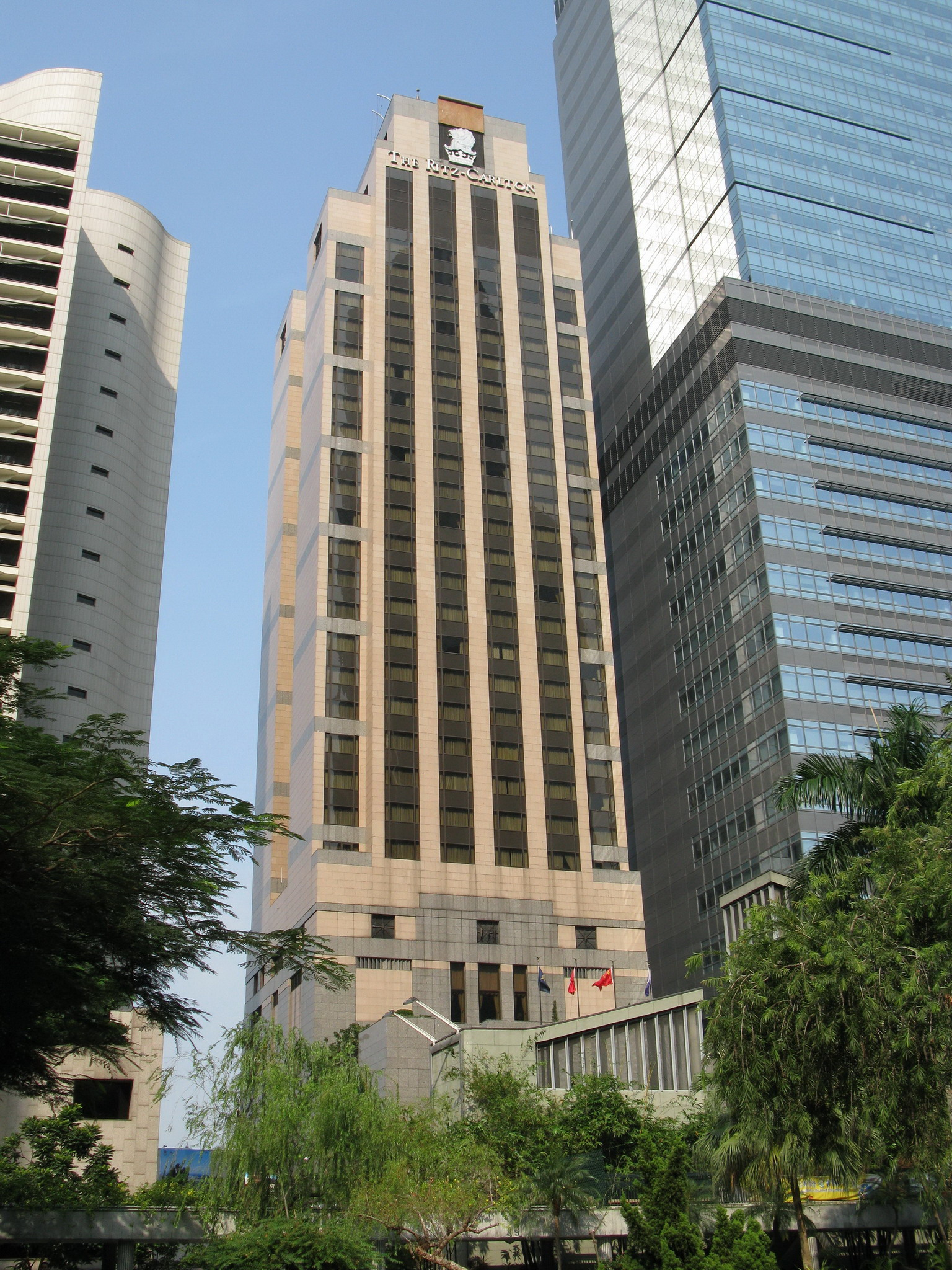
The first The Ritz-Carlton Hong Kong, demolished 2009

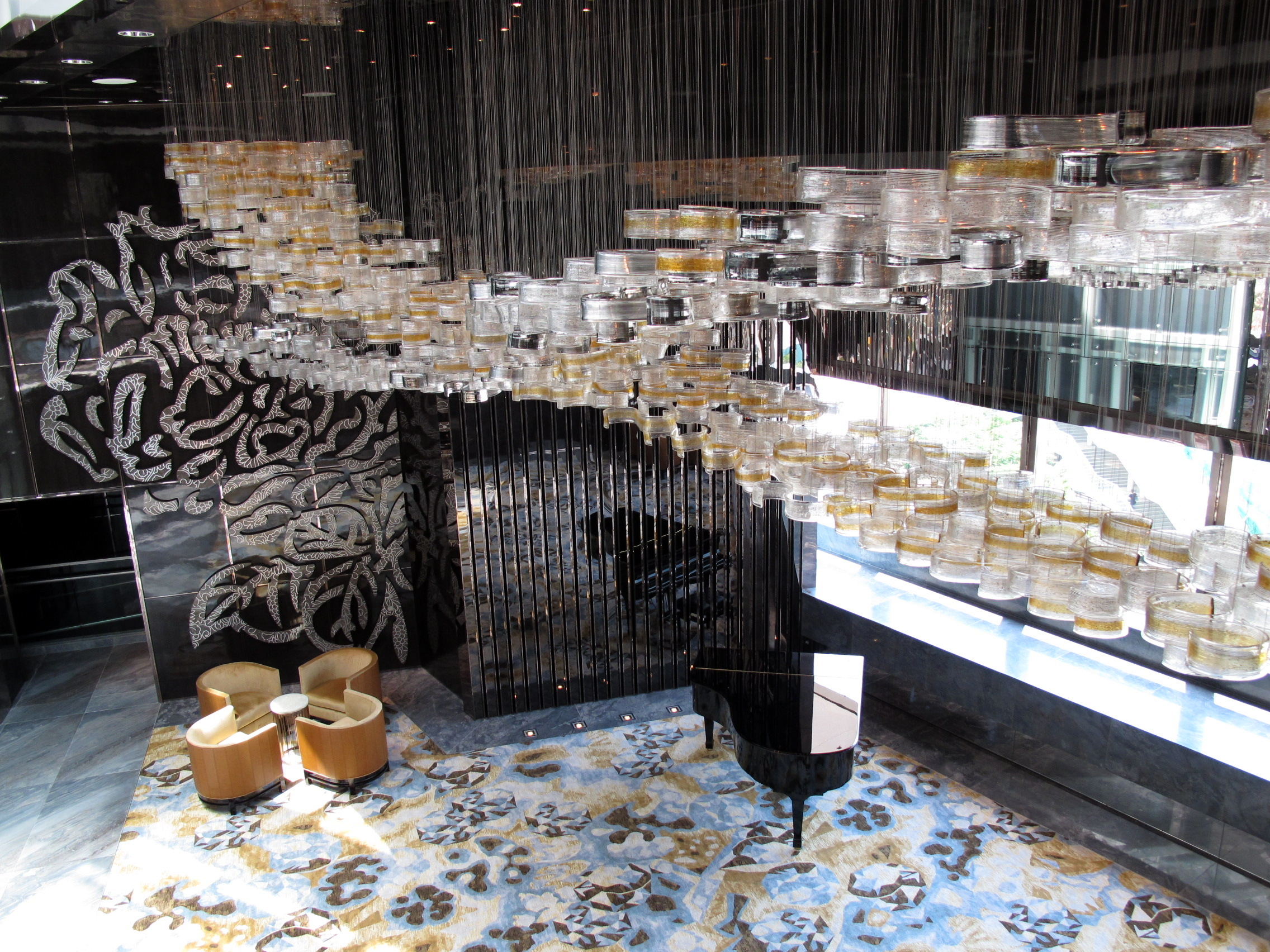
Level 7 open area

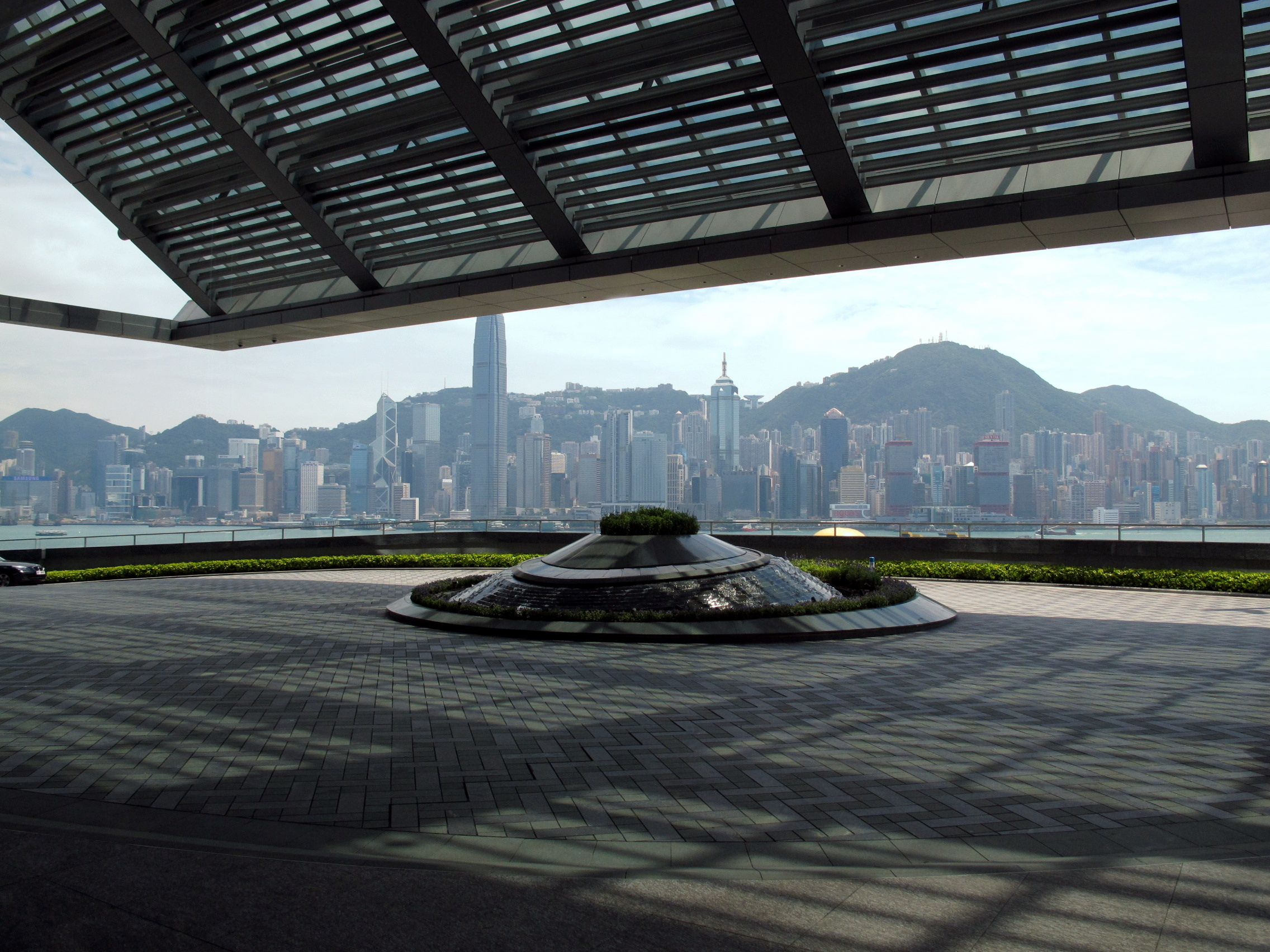
Outside parking area

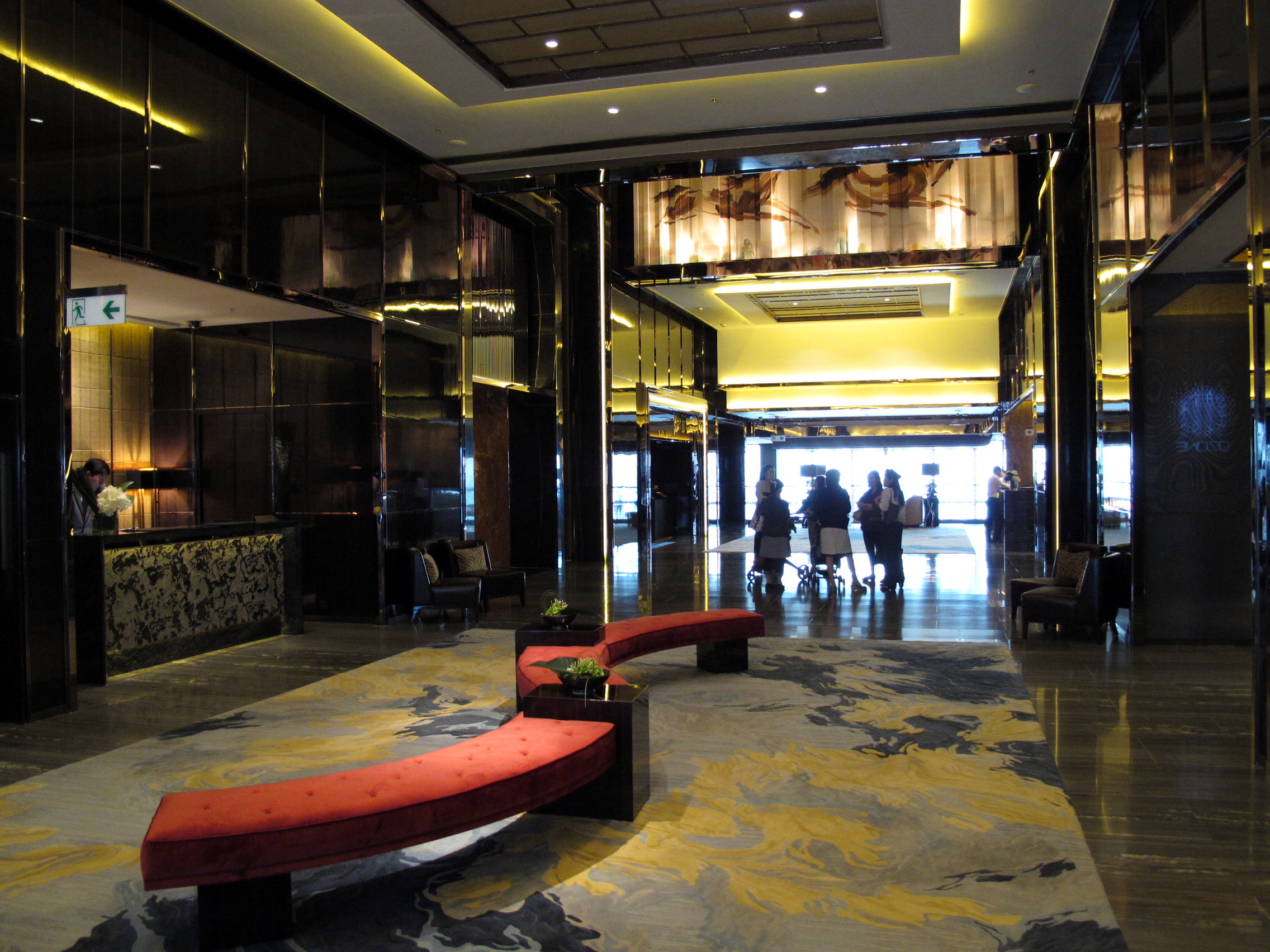
Lobby on 103rd floor

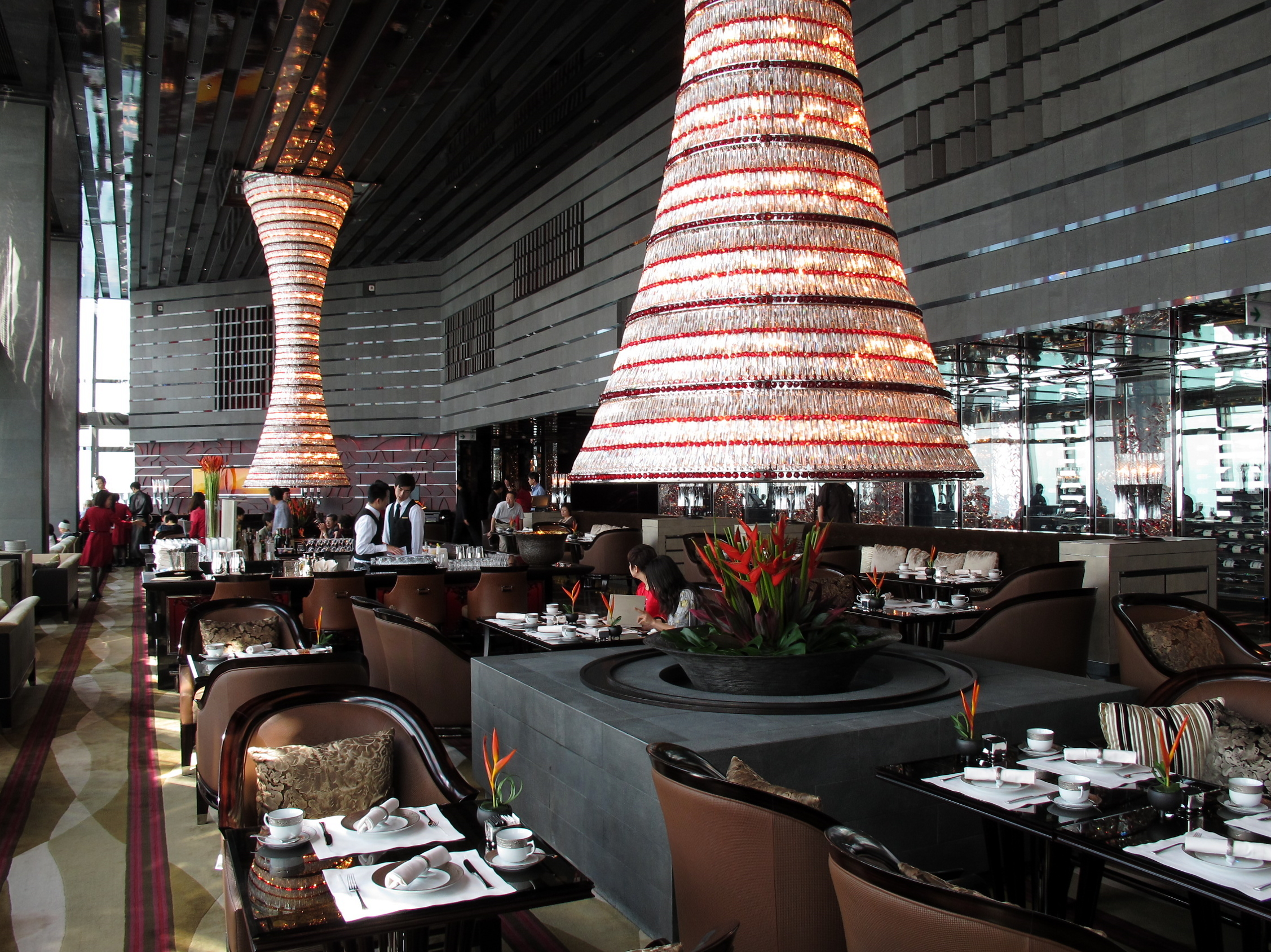
The Lounge & Bar

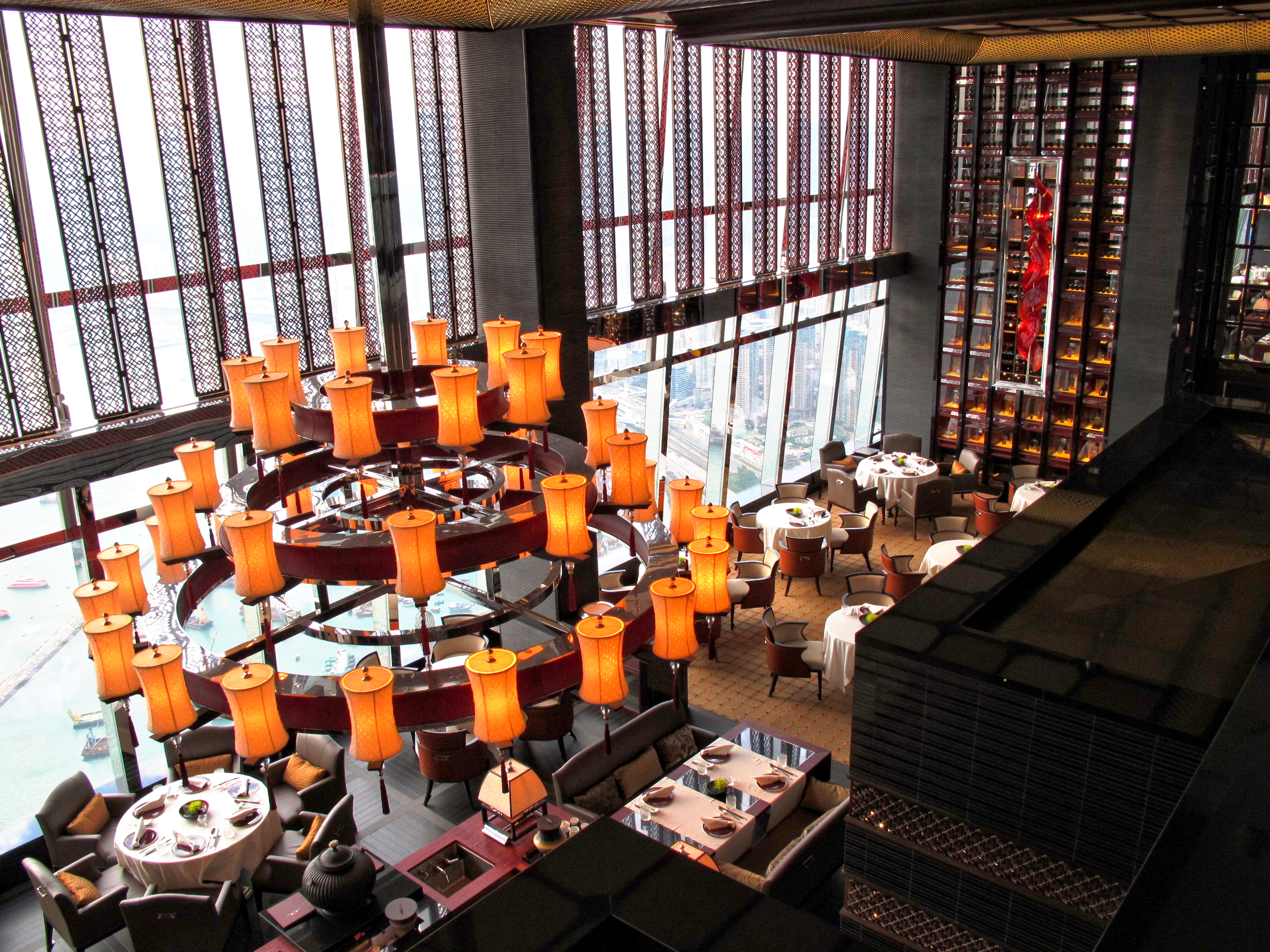
Tin Lung Heen Chinese Restaurant

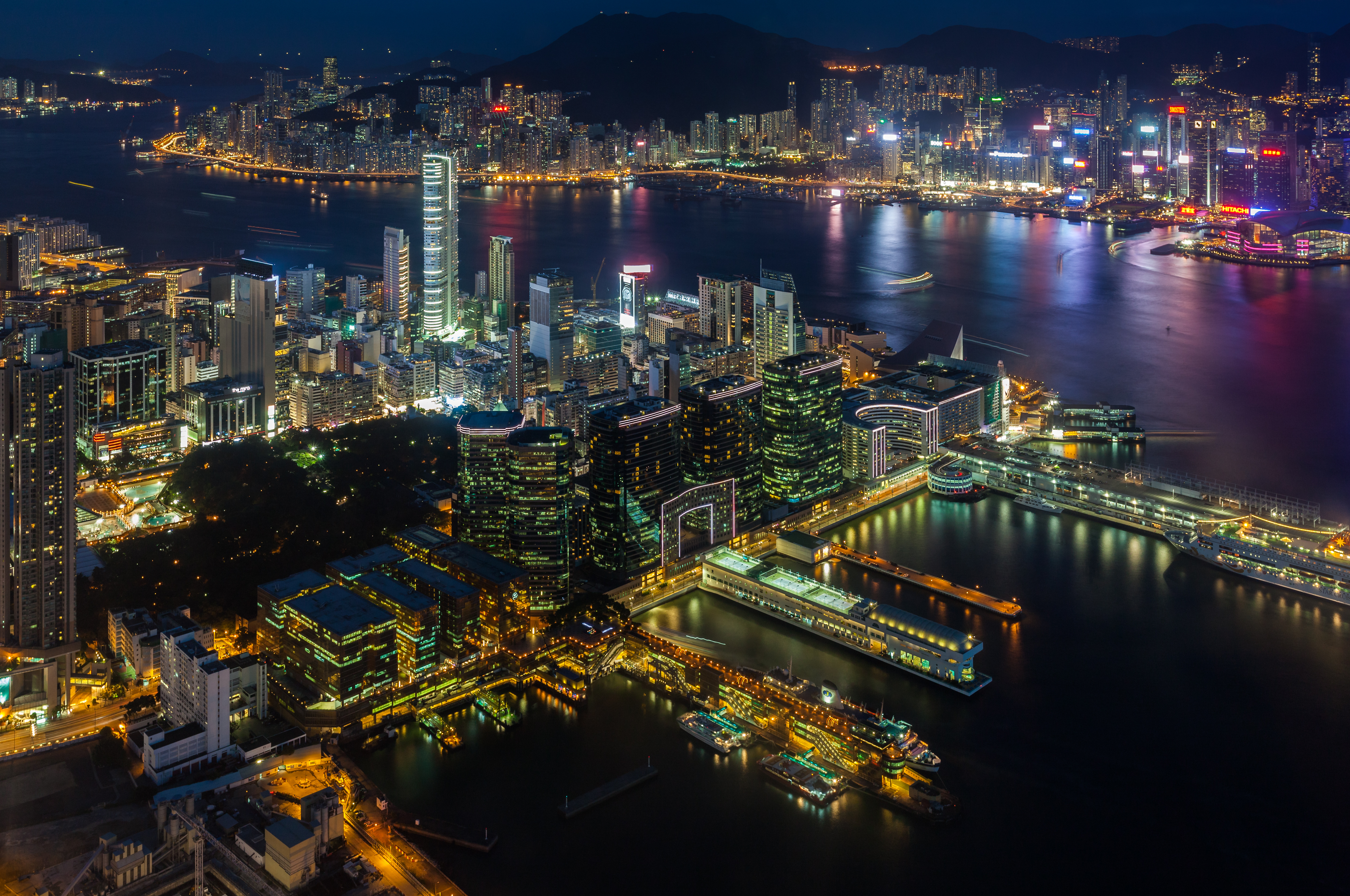
Night view of Hong Kong Harbor from The Ritz-Carlton HK

== See also ==
- Architecture of Hong Kong
- List of hotels in Hong Kong
- List of tallest hotels in the world
- List of tallest voluntarily demolished buildings
- Sky100, a 360-degree indoor observation deck on the 100th floor of the International Commerce Centre
