= Sally Storey =

British architectural lighting designer

- Born: England, United Kingdom
- Education: University of Bristol
- Occupation: Lighting designer
- Spouse: Christopher Fordham
- Practice: Architectural lighting design
- Buildings: The Berkeley (London), Claridge's (London), Four Seasons Hotel George V (Paris), Hotel Hermitage (Monaco), The Ritz-Carlton, Hong Kong
- Website: Lighting Design International

Sally Storey is an architectural lighting designer based in the United Kingdom. She is most notable for her lighting design work on many luxury hotels, offices, and residences of historical significance around the world, such as The Berkeley (London), Claridge's (London), Four Seasons Hotel George V (Paris), Hotel Hermitage (Monaco), The Alpina Gstaad (Switzerland), and The Ritz-Carlton, Hong Kong.

Other notable buildings that Storey has worked on include the Temple Church, Lord's Cricket Ground, Skibo Castle, Dundrum Castle, CityPoint, Hammerson, Grosvenor Place, and Lumiere.

== Education and career ==
Storey studied architecture at the University of Bristol during the early 1980s, and then worked with lighting designer John Cullen, whom she met during her second year at university. After Cullen died in 1986, Storey became the Design Director at John Cullen Lighting, and also Design Director of Lighting Design International.

Storey has worked on many notable buildings across Europe, including:

- The Berkeley hotel in London
- Claridge's hotel in London
- Four Seasons Hotel George V in Paris, France
- Hotel Hermitage in Monaco
- Coral Reef Club, Barbados
- The Ritz-Carlton, Hong Kong
- London Heathrow Airport VIP Lounge
- Cap Ferrat resort, French Riviera, France
- The Savoy Hotel in London
- The Alpina Gstaad in Switzerland

Additional buildings that Storey and her companies have worked on:

Historic buildings

- Temple Church
- Lord's Cricket Ground
- Royal Geographical Society
- Bell Court
- Skibo Castle
- Dundrum Castle
- Whatley Manor
- One Aldwych
- Seaham Hall
- Theo Fennell
- Veeraswamy

Hotels, spas, and resorts

- Hotel Cafe Royal
- The Principal Edinburgh George Street
- The Principal Manchester
- Hotel Imperial
- Hotel Grande Bretagne
- Grand-Hôtel du Cap-Ferrat
- Sandy Lane
- Grande Bretagne
- Threadneedles Hotel

Offices

- CityPoint
- Hammerson
- Grosvenor Place
- Lumiere
- Morgan Sindall
- Morgan Stanley Dean Witter

Other projects that Storey had worked on include various superyachts and historical castles, such as in the Loire Valley of France. Storey also helps design creative lighting schemes in commercial buildings and residences in North America, Europe, the Middle East and across Asia, including in Dubai, Mumbai, and other Asian cities.

Storey's major influences include Sir John Soane, who early on discovered the power of light, and designers such as Jonathan Reed, with a design style focusing on simplicity.

== Personal life ==
Storey lives in Kensington, London with her husband, publisher Christopher Fordham, and their three children.

== Publications ==
Storey's publications are:

- Storey, Sally (2022). Inspired by Light : A Design Guide to Transforming the Home. RIBA Publishing. ISBN 9781859469057.
- Storey, Sally (2008). Perfect Lighting: Inspiring Solutions for Every Room. Creative Homeowner. ISBN 9781580114172.
- Storey, Sally (2005). Lighting by Design. Pavilion. ISBN 9781862057036.
- Storey, Sally (2000). Lighting. Quadrille Publishing. ISBN 9781902757216.
- Storey, Sally (2000). Recipes and Ideas: Lighting: Simple Solutions for the Home. Chronicle Books. ISBN 9780811827164.
