= The Cullinan =

Housing estate in Kowloon, Hong Kong

- 天璽
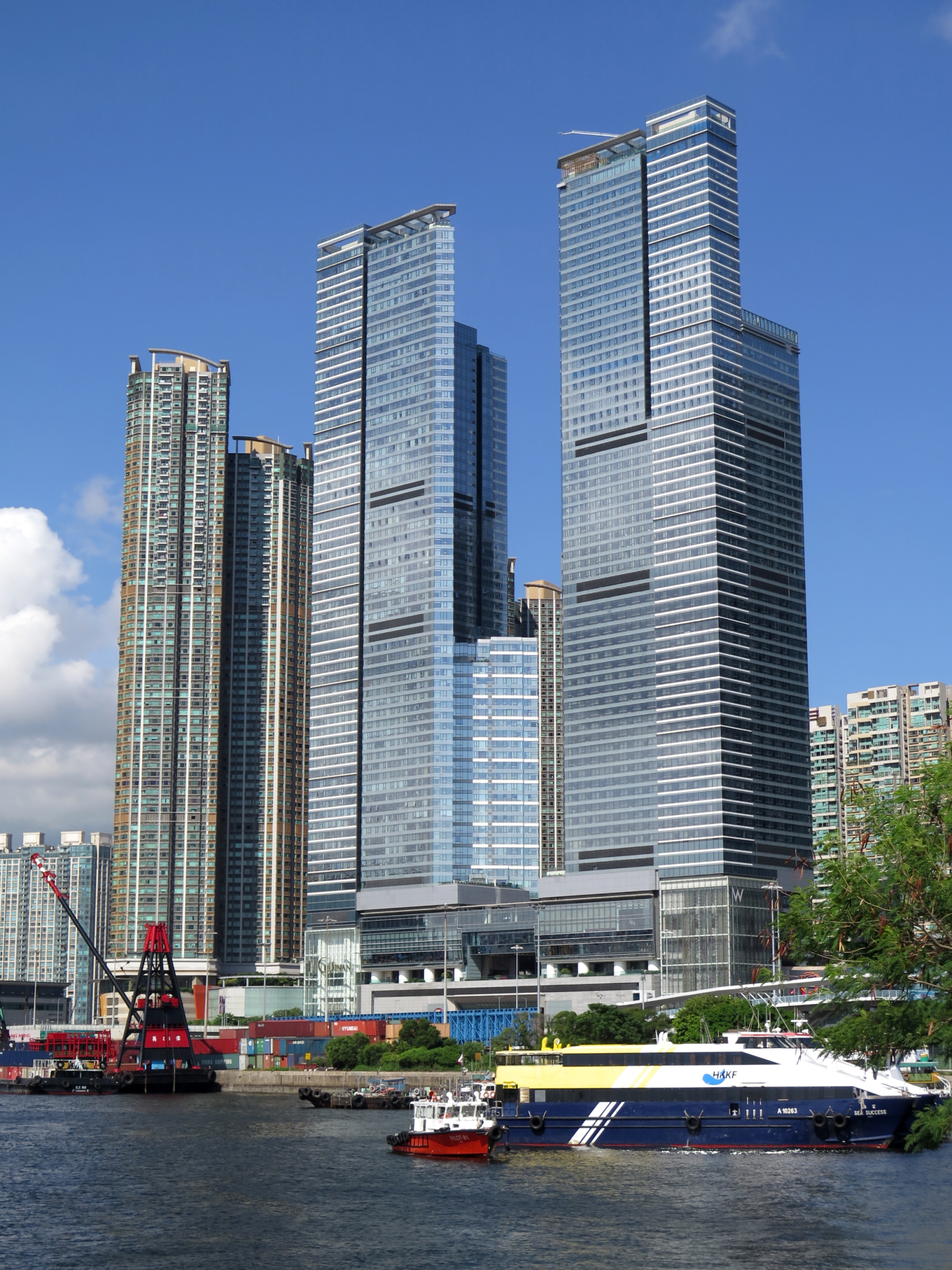
- Interactive map of the The Cullinan area

General information
- Location: Union Square, Kowloon, Hong Kong
- Coordinates: 22°18′19.4″N 114°09′38.8″E
- Construction started: 2007; 19 years ago
- Completed: 2008/2009

Height
- Antenna spire: 270 m (885.8 ft)

Technical details
- Floor count: 68

Design and construction
- Architect: Wong & Ouyang
- Developer: Sun Hung Kai Properties
- Main contractor: Sanfield Building Contractors

The Cullinan
- Traditional Chinese: 天璽
Transcriptions
Yue: Cantonese
- Yale Romanization: Tīn sáai
- Jyutping: Tin1 saai2

The Cullinan is a luxury private housing estate located in the Union Square, West Kowloon, Hong Kong.

The building has glass curtain walls and views of Victoria Harbour. The glass facade matches the design language of the neighbouring International Commerce Centre.

This complex was named after the 3,106 carat (621.2 g) Cullinan Diamond found in 1905; the largest gem-quality rough diamond ever found, whose constituent cut diamonds are found in the British Crown Jewels and Elizabeth II's jewels.

During development under Sun Hung Kai Properties, the complex went by Kowloon Station Development Package 6 and Union Square Phase 6. Both towers of The Cullinan complex, called The Cullinan North Tower and The Cullinan South Tower, are Hong Kong's tallest residential towers at 68 storeys and 270 metres (886 feet). They were completed in 2008 and 2009 respectively.

== Original proposal ==
The Cullinan complex was proposed at only 45 storeys up until the cancellation of Union Square Phase 5. After Phase 5 was dropped, the Cullinan Towers were proposed at the current 93 floors instead. The penthouse apartment units are located on the top floors of the building. According to Time magazine, it "could well qualify as the world's most expensive apartments."

== See also ==
- List of tallest buildings in Hong Kong
- Kowloon station
- W Hong Kong
