= West Kowloon =

Geographic area of Hong Kong

Coordinates: 22°18′13″N 114°09′36″E

- Traditional Chinese: 西九龍
- Simplified Chinese: 西九龙
Transcriptions
Standard Mandarin
- Hanyu Pinyin: Xī Jiǔlóng
Yue: Cantonese
- Jyutping: sai1 gau2 lung4

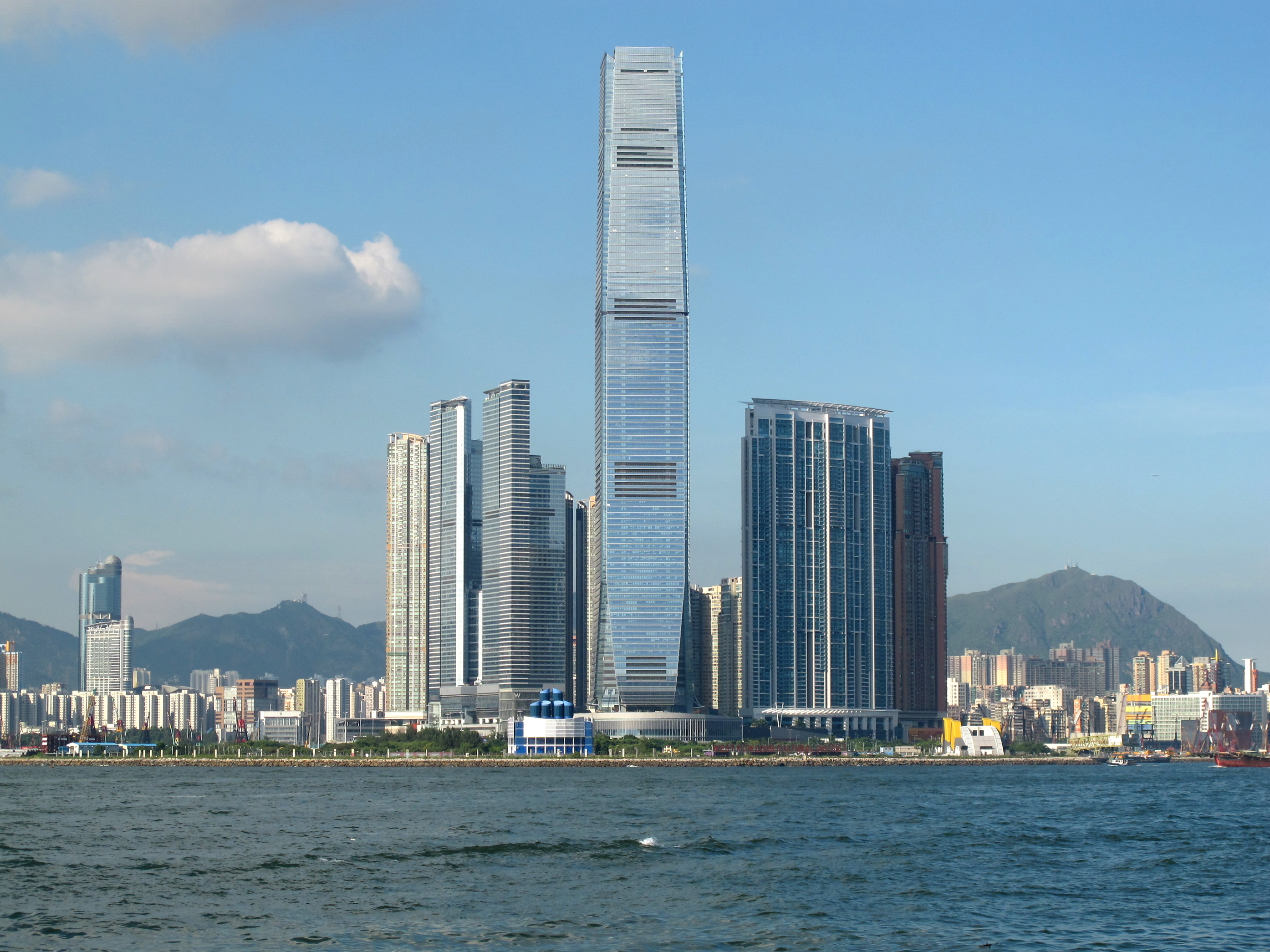
The Union Square development.

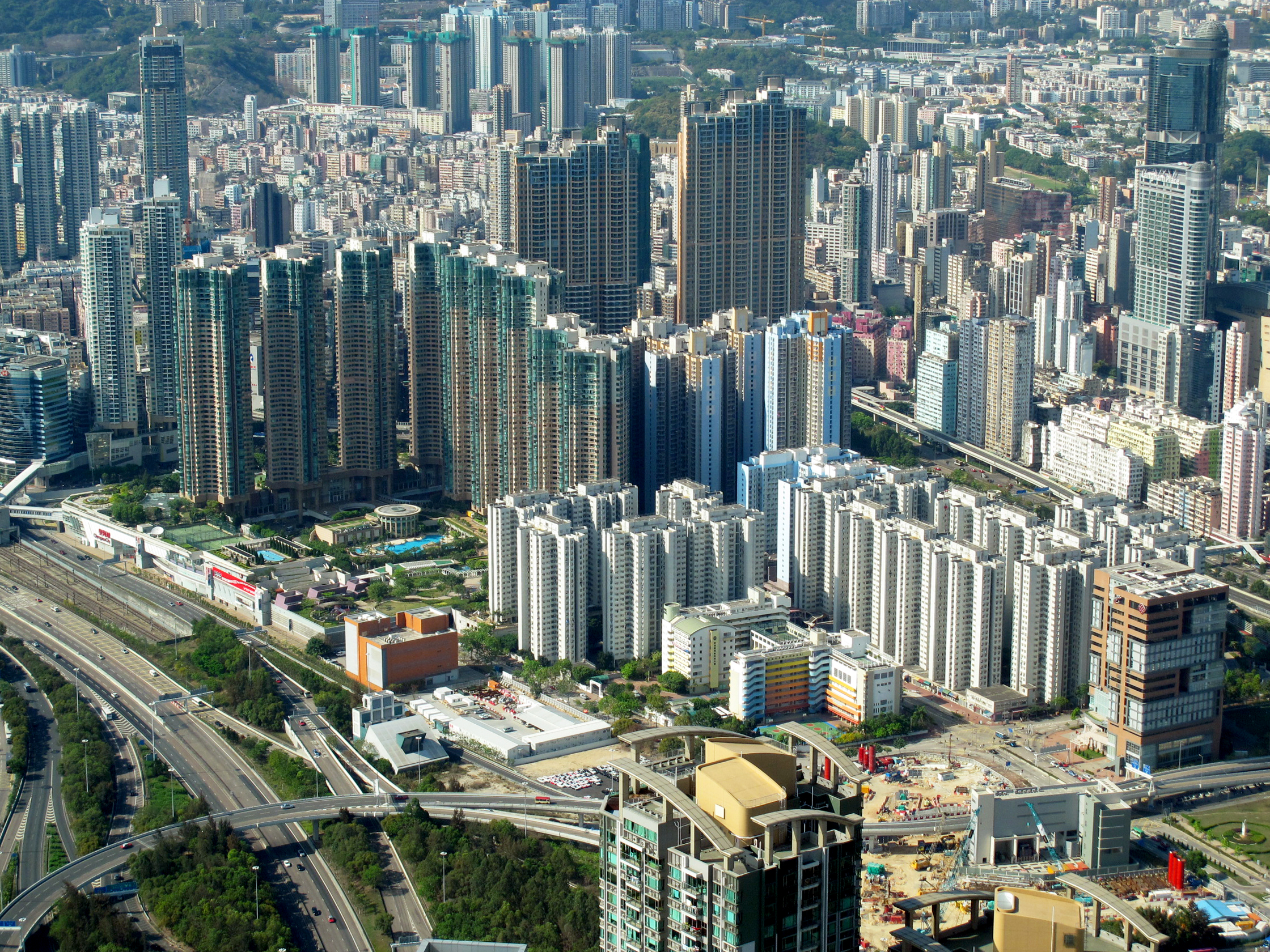
High-rise residential blocks near Olympic Station

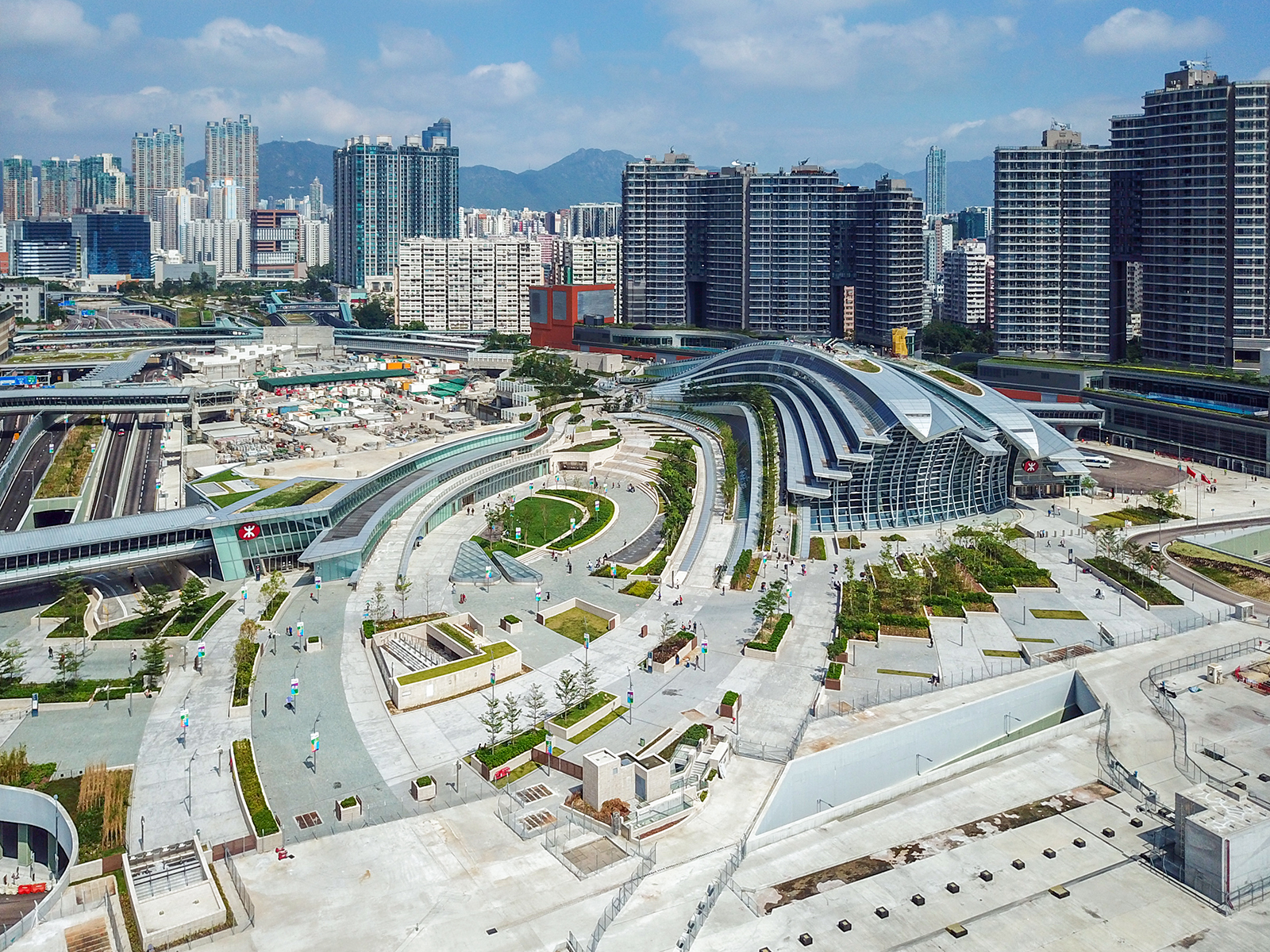
Hong Kong West Kowloon railway station, the terminus of Guangzhou–Shenzhen–Hong Kong Express Rail Link

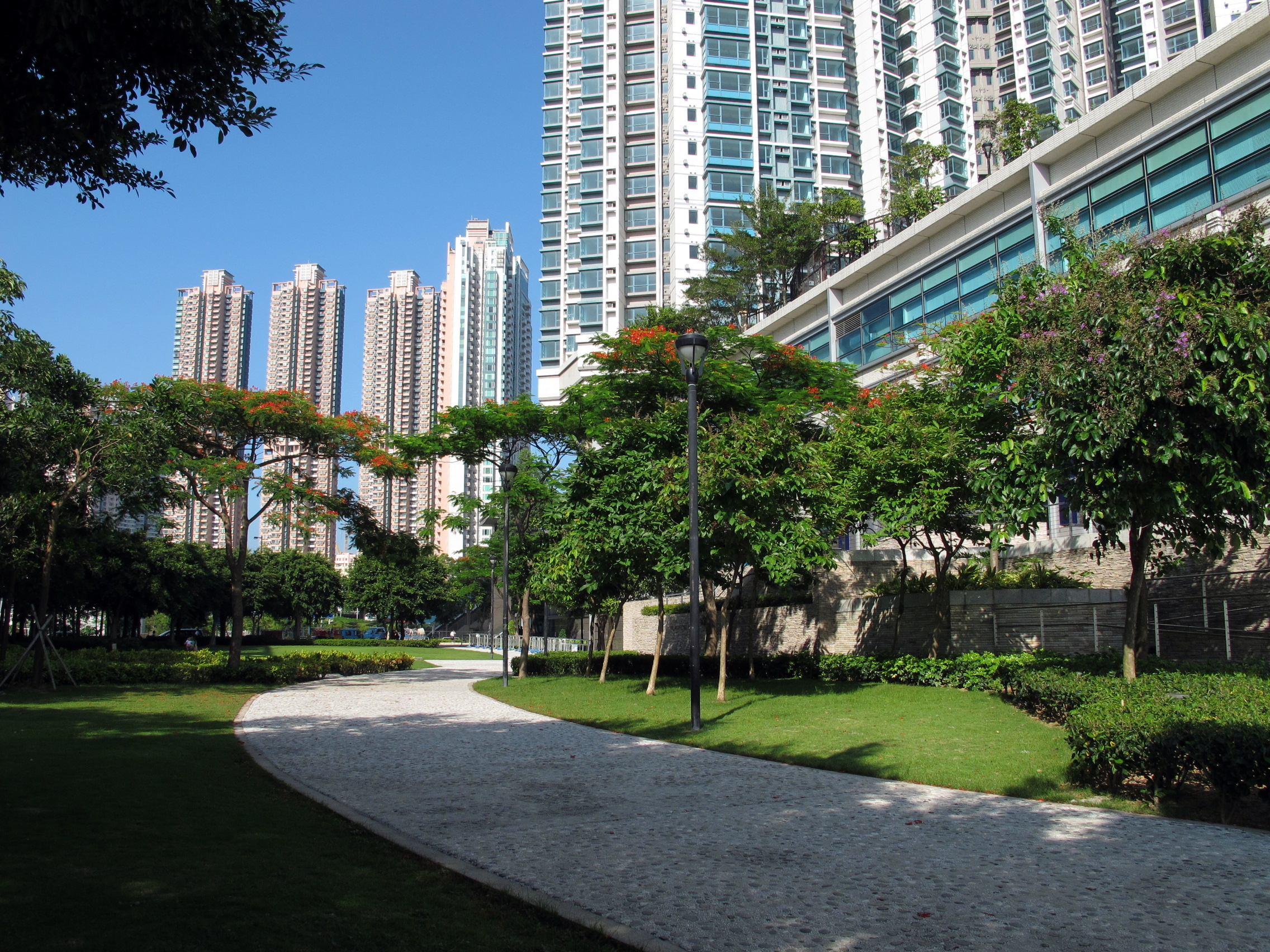
The Long Beach Public open spaces

West Kowloon (Chinese: 西九龍), named after West Kowloon Reclamation Project as a part of Airport Core Programme, is the western part of Kowloon Peninsula in Hong Kong, situated within the Yau Tsim Mong District and Sham Shui Po District. The reclamation spanned from mid-1990s to mid-2003, but major part was completed in 1990s. It represents the new coast area facing Victoria Harbour and West Kowloon Cultural District is its focal point. Multiple railway stations, namely Nam Cheong, Olympic, Austin, Kowloon and Hong Kong West Kowloon stations, are within the area.

Before the 1990s reclamation, the name of West Kowloon were also used to refer western part of Kowloon, such as West Kowloon Corridor and West Kowloon Area Traffic Control System. The area referred to could change over time and have different usages by departments. In legislative elections, it is Kowloon West and its area is changed frequently.

For the reclamation, many of government projects named after West Kowloon, such as West Kowloon Waterfront Promenade, Hong Kong West Kowloon railway station and West Kowloon Cultural District lays in the area bounded by Canton Road to the east, Victoria Harbour to the west and the south, and Jordan Road to the north, overlapping with Ferry Point or Austin. West Kowloon Cultural District, a tourist hotspot, got much attention as the representative of West Kowloon.

But West Kowloon spans much further north and ends in Stonecutters Island, including Yau Ma Tei, Mong Kok, Tai Kok Tsui, Sham Shui Po, Cheung Sha Wan and Lai Chi Kok roughly on the shore side of the West Kowloon Highway. Property agents branded four private housing estate projects, Banyan Garden, Liberte, AquaMarine and The Pacifica, in Cheung Sha Wan as West Kowloon Four Little Dragons (西九四小龍). Another example is from Environmental Protection Department that West Kowloon Transfer Station is located on the reclamation next to Stonecutters Island. Also, West Kowloon Government Offices situates on the reclamation next to Yau Ma Tei, and West Kowloon Law Courts Building next to Cheung Sha Wan.

== West Kowloon reclamation ==
It is principally a stretch of reclaimed land, which was subsequently developed in the late 20th century. It has been zoned for mixed commercial, residential and leisure development, and was almost doubled in size with a large reclamation scheme as part of the Airport Core Programme.

== Structures ==
=== Existing ===
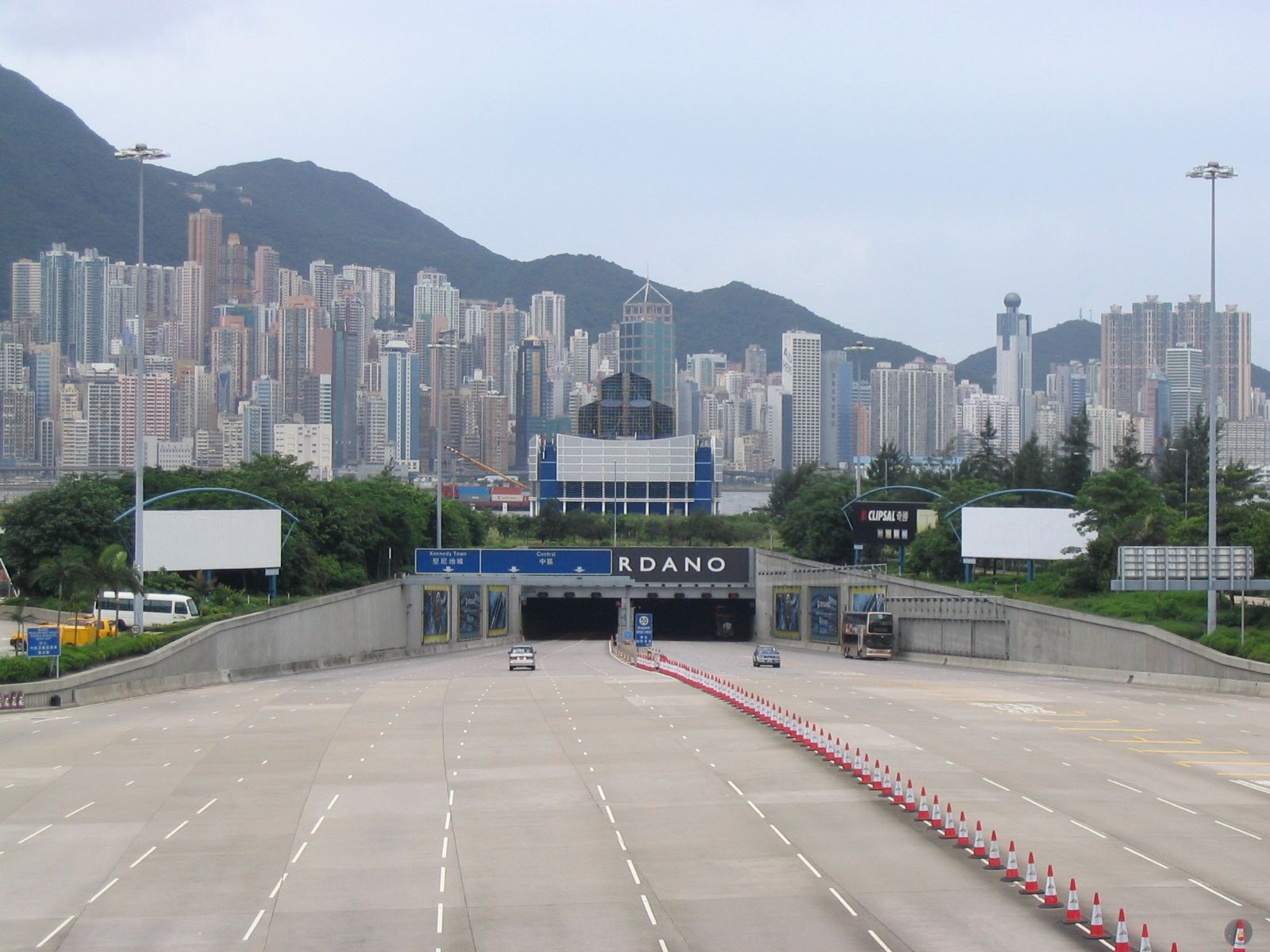
The Western Harbour Crossing connects West Kowloon to Hong Kong Island

- West Kowloon Waterfront Promenade
- West Kowloon Corridor - a bypass connecting Lai Chi Kok Road with the Gascoigne Road Flyover in Yau Ma Tei
- Western Harbour Crossing - Hong Kong's third harbour crossing, the Kowloon portal of which is located within West Kowloon
- Kowloon station, Austin station, Olympic station and Nam Cheong station of MTR
- Hong Kong West Kowloon railway station - Hong Kong's high speed rail terminal connecting to mainland China.
- International Commerce Centre - the current tallest building in Hong Kong

=== Under construction ===
- West Kowloon Cultural District - leisure and cultural district
- Central Kowloon Route Yau Ma Tei interchange

== Projects ==
=== Existing ===
Commercial projects include International Commerce Centre, a 484-metre (1,588 ft) skyscraper which is part of the Union Square project.

Residential projects which have been realised in the sector include The Waterfront (2000), Sorrento (2003), The Harbourside (2003), and The Arch (2005), and The Cullinan (2008, the tallest residential building in Hong Kong). The above all sit atop Kowloon MTR station, a station on the Tung Chung line and Airport Express line. The shopping-mall Elements started operating on 1 October 2007.

=== Plots auctioned ===
In August 2005, two neighbouring sites near Central Park and Park Avenue were triggered for auction, and were subsequently acquired by a joint venture of Sino Land, Chinese Estates Holdings and Nan Fung Development.

In May 2007, a site bounded by Hoi Wang Road, Yan Cheung Road and Yau Cheung Road was won by a consortium comprising Sino Land, Chinese Estates Holdings, K Wah International and Nan Fung Development, for a bid of HK$4 billion. Following the successful auction of the site, some legislators called for a law to stop developers from constructing tall buildings which maximise good views at the expense of air flow in densely populated areas, but the bid failed.
