= Shopping in Hong Kong =

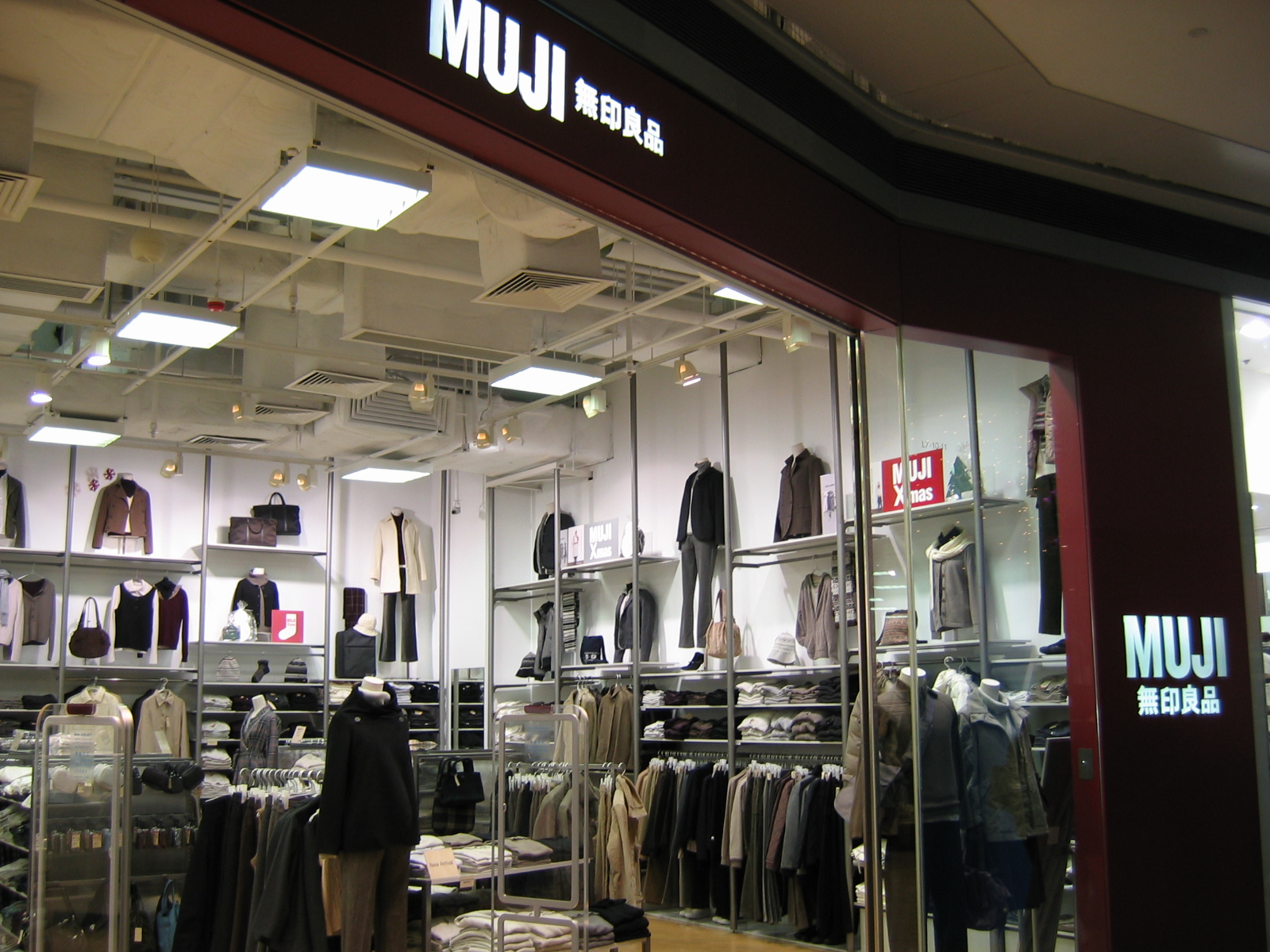
Muji store in Hong Kong

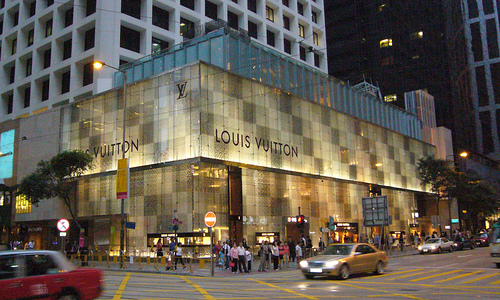
The Louis Vuitton branch in Hong Kong

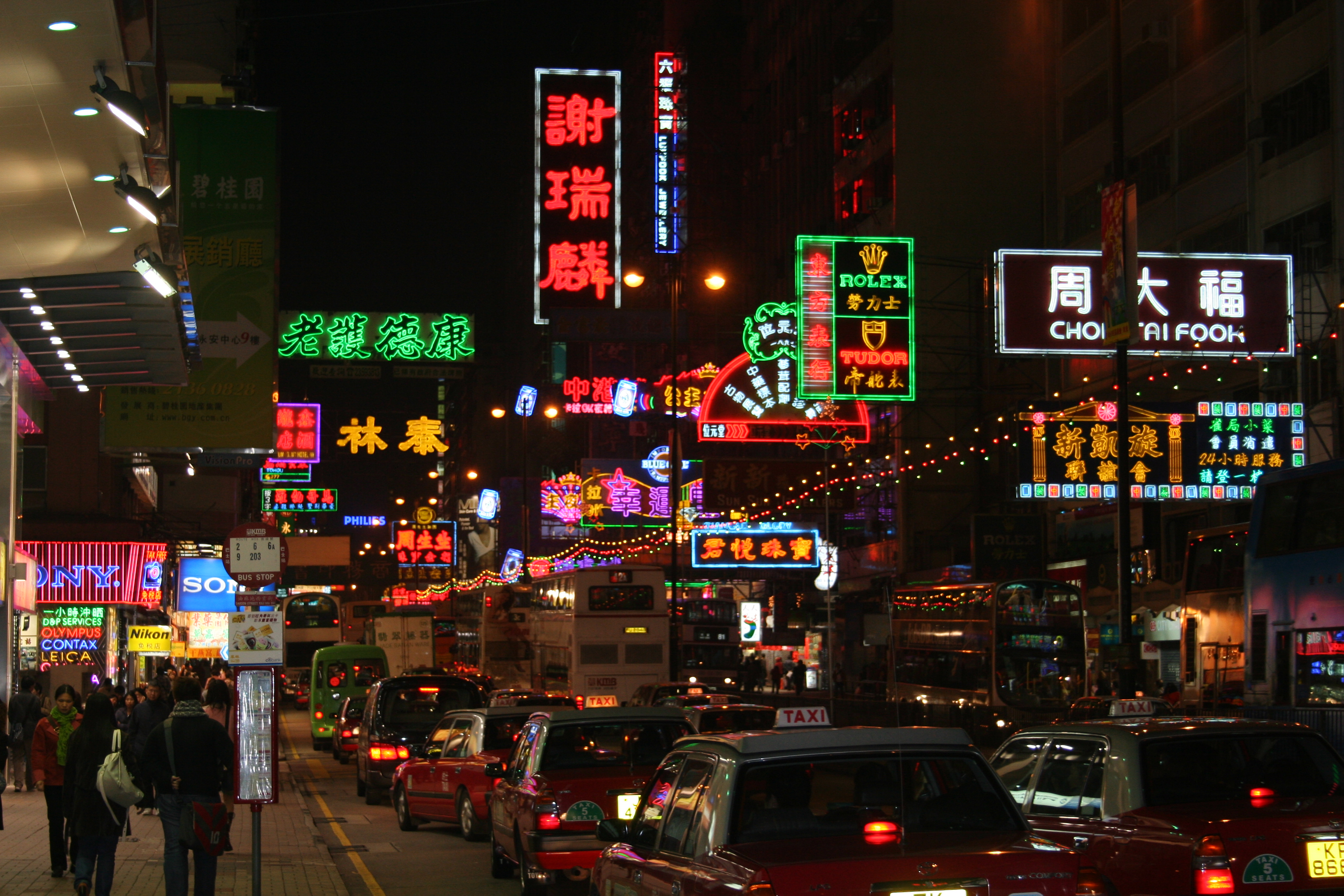
Nathan Road in Kowloon

Shopping is a popular social activity in Hong Kong, where basic items for sale do not draw any duties, sales taxation, or import taxation. Only specific import goods such as alcohol, tobacco, perfumes, cosmetics, cars and petroleum products have associated taxes. For companies, there is a 17.5% corporate tax, which is lower than international standards. Shoppers reportedly spend over US$5.2 billion a month in Hong Kong shops.

Hong Kong's proximity to manufacturing plants in China, as well as its status as a free port, allow it to sell and transport a wide variety of goods. There are few restrictions on merchandise vending, and therefore items such as realistic toy weapons are available. The two main shopping seasons are at Christmas and the Chinese New Year.

The region is unique in the sense that it is official languages are both Cantonese and English, which enables a healthy tourist trade with English-speaking customers as bilingual sales tags and salespeople are common, especially in tourist areas. The MTR subway and effective taxi service also facilitate Hong Kong's busy shopping industry.

== Overview ==
Hong Kong is the fifth largest exporter of jewellery in the world, mainly in the supply of jade and gold, and the second largest exporter of custom jewellery. Chow Seng Seng and Luk Fook are among the more well-known local jewellery chains.

A variety of cuisines are available in Hong Kong; the Soho area in Central is the centre for Western foods, while traditional Chinese cuisines including Shanghainese, Hanainanese, and Cantonese are widely available. Street vendors or hawkers selling local snacks such as dumplings and snake soup can be found in Mong Kok and Causeway Bay.

Custom tailoring is popular and affordable in Hong Kong. Customers can draw out a design for clothing and have it made in a few days. Modern fashion is sold in the Times Square, IFC, and Elements shopping malls, while leather goods are available in Tsim Sha Tsui. Fa Yuen Street and the Ladies Market (女人街) on Tung Choi Street in Mong Kok, as well as Jardine’s Crescent in Causeway Bay, are known for the availability of low-priced clothing and accessories.

Electronics from Japan and Europe are available for example in Apliu Street and the Golden Shopping Center in Sham Shui Po. There are computer appliances centers in Wan Chai, Mong Kok, Tsim Sha Tsui, Kowloon, and Causeway Bay.

Japanese culture has become popular in Hong Kong, with Japanese department stores such as Sogo, Yata, and Muji operating. Japanese clothing brands like Swordfish, Moussy, and Uniqlo have also opened flagship stores in the city.

Stanley Market sells a variety of inexpensive goods, particularly souvenirs. Antiques can be found on Upper Lascar Row and Hollywood Road, which are popular with tourists.

== History ==
During its early colonial period, Hong Kong served as a port that sold far more than it consumed. Goods were mostly sold via mobile hawking or independent traders, with the majority of trade, utilities, shipping, and manufacturing handled by major business houses known as hongs. The establishment of banks and deposit institutions allowed people to accumulate savings.

The economy underwent an upturn in the 1960s, which led to the opening of several shopping centres.

== Shopping centres ==
Two of the first modern shopping centres were Ocean Terminal in Tsim Sha Tsui and The Landmark in Central, above the MTR station. Daimaru led a trend of Japanese exports into Hong Kong in 1966 and Deng Xiaoping's 1978 Open Door Policy made Hong Kong the definitive gateway to China. As the economy improved during the 1970s and 80s, there was increasing demand for luxury goods, such as air conditioning.

In 1984, Cityplaza in Taikoo Shing was redeveloped. A large architectural project at the time was also undertaken to connect Ocean Centre to the Harbour City shopping mall in Tsim Sha Tsui. Many large shopping centres were also built in the new towns, including Tuen Mun Town Plaza, New Town Plaza, and Tai Po Mega Mall.

The large mall construction movement continued into the 1990s with Pacific Place, Dragon Centre, Time Square, Plaza Hollywood and Festival Walk. Developments further expanded into the New Territories.

== Speciality local stores ==
- Arome Bakery - bakery chain store
- Cheap Lab - stationery
- c!ty'super - supermarket and lifestyle
- Commercial Press - book store chain
- Goods of Desire (G.O.D.) - lifestyle retail store
- Giordano - retail clothing store
- Joint Publishing - book store chain
- Leung So Kee - umbrellas
- ParknShop - supermarkets
- Sincere Department Store
- Watson's - pharmactical, health and beauty chain store
- Wellcome - supermarkets
- Wing On - department chain store
- Yu Kee Food - chain supermarkets

== See also ==
- Hawkers in Hong Kong
