= List of cinemas in Hong Kong =

This is a list of current and former cinemas in Hong Kong.

== Broadway Circuit ==
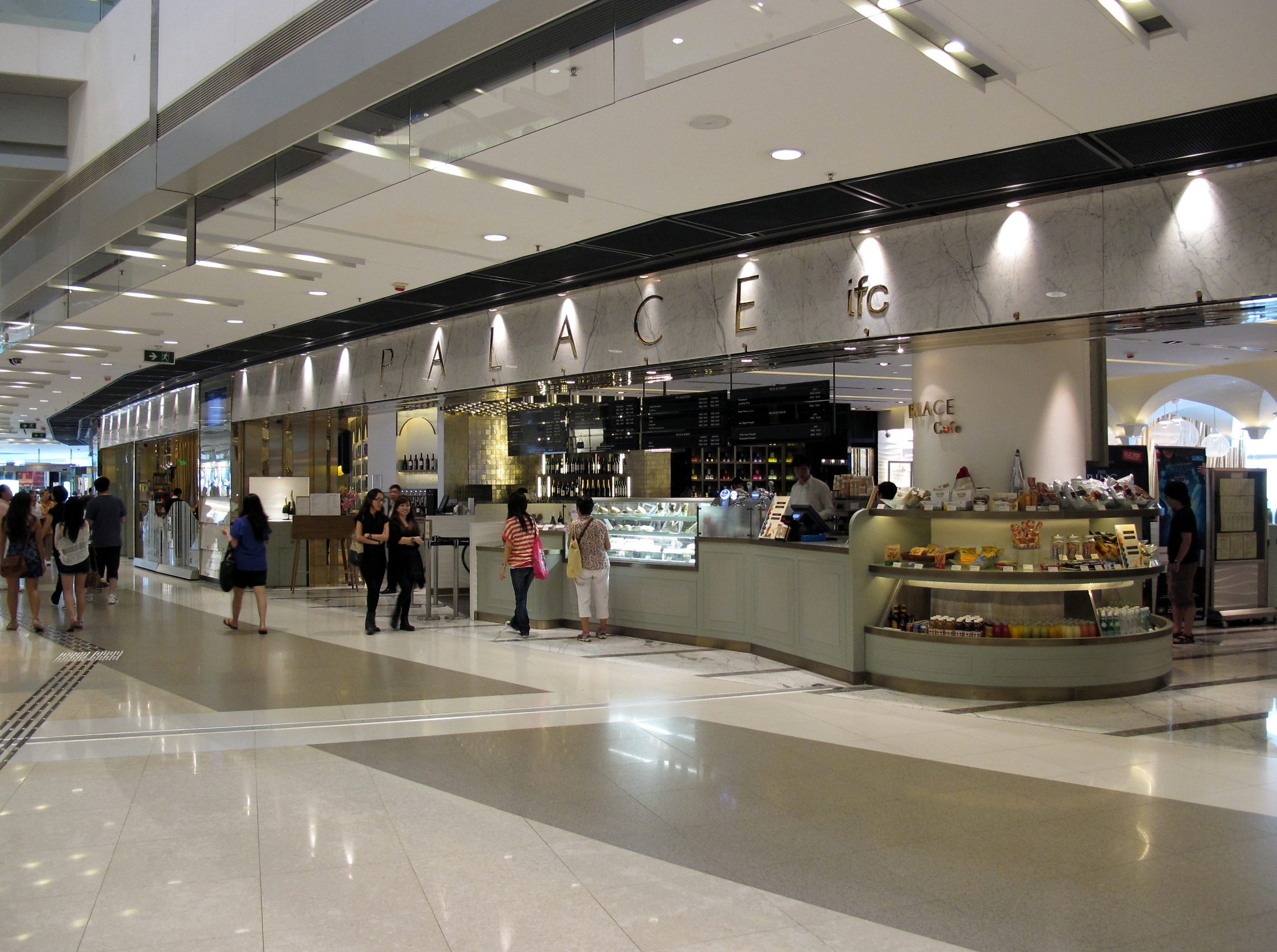
PALACE ifc

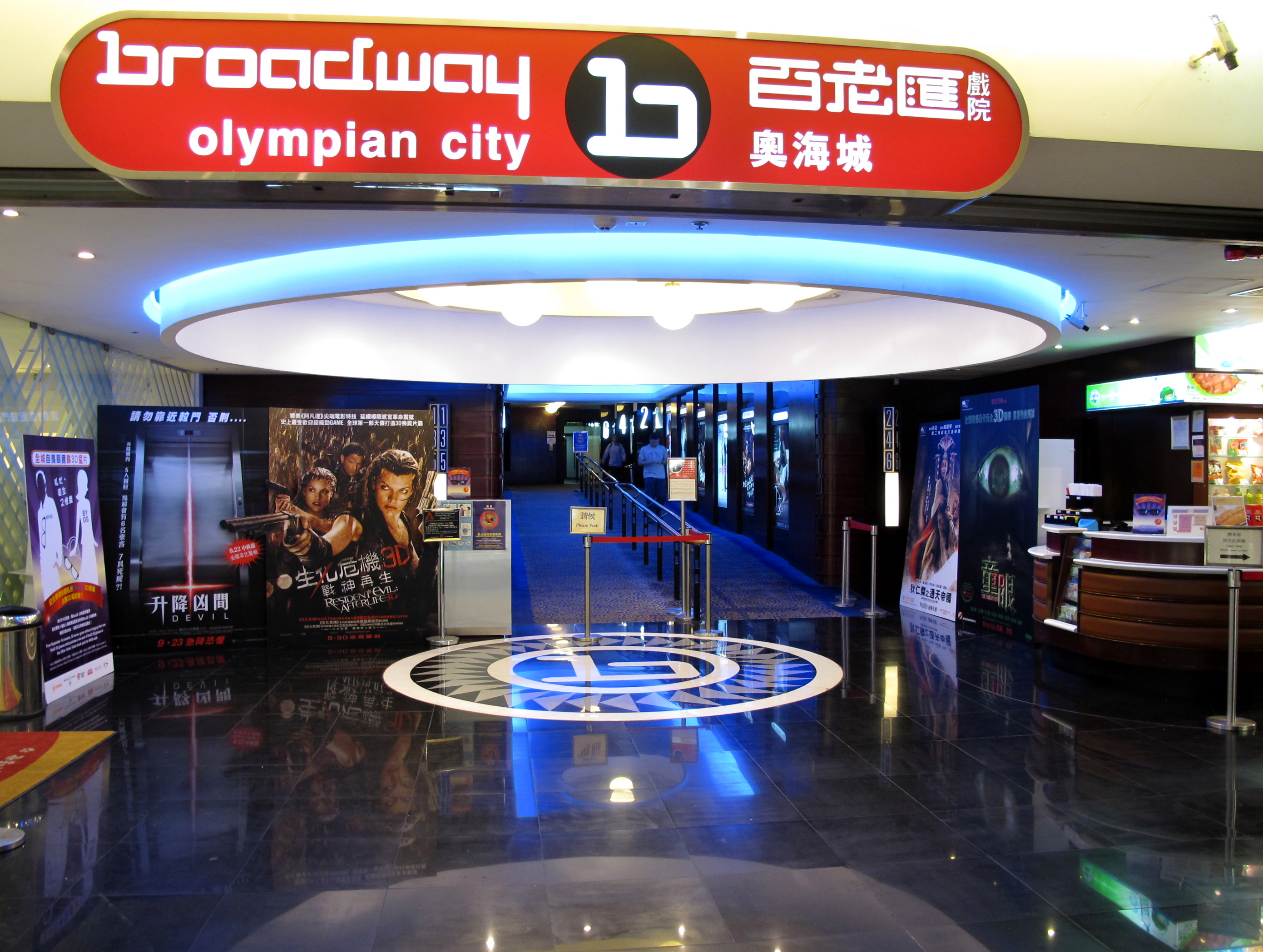
Former Broadway Olympian City cinema

In addition to operating its own brand, Broadway Circuit also operates the B+, PALACE, Premiere Elements, MOViE MOViE and MY CINEMA chains. It previously run AMC-branded cinema in Pacific Place.

1. Broadway Cinematheque
2. Broadway Kingswood Ginza, at Kingswood Ginza
3. Broadway Kwai Fong, at Metroplaza
4. Broadway Mongkok, on Sai Yeung Choi Street South
5. Broadway Tsuen Wan, at Tsuen Wan Plaza
6. B+ apm, at apm
7. B+ MOKO at MOKO
8. PALACE ifc, at IFC Mall
9. Premiere Elements, at Elements Mall (former site of The Grand Cinema)
10. MOViE MOViE, at Cityplaza
11. MOViE MOViE, at Pacific Place, Admiralty, Hong Kong
12. MY CINEMA YOHO MALL, at Yoho Mall, Yuen Long
13. Broadway GALA CINEMA, at Langham Place

Former cinemas

- Broadway Kornhill, at Kornhill Plaza; closed in 2002; succeeded by MCL Kornhill
- Broadway Kowloon Bay, at Amoy Plaza; closed in March 2009 - now MCL Amoy
- Broadway Olympian City, at Olympian City; closed on 16 September 2013 – now the sky, at Olympian City 2
- Broadway Yuen Long, at Sun Yuen Long Centre; closed on 6 March 2013 (Operation now focused on MY CINEMA, also located in the same YOHO MALL precinct)
- AMC Pacific Place at Pacific Place, Admiralty, Hong Kong – renamed as MOVIE MOVIE on 5 August 2020
- AMC Festival Walk, at Festival Walk, Kowloon Tong – now MCL Festival Grand
- Broadway Cyberport, at The Arcade, Cyberport; succeeded by MCL Cyberport
- Broadway Hollywood, at Plaza Hollywood; closed in 2002; succeeded by MCL Hollywood

== Chinachem Cinema Circuit ==
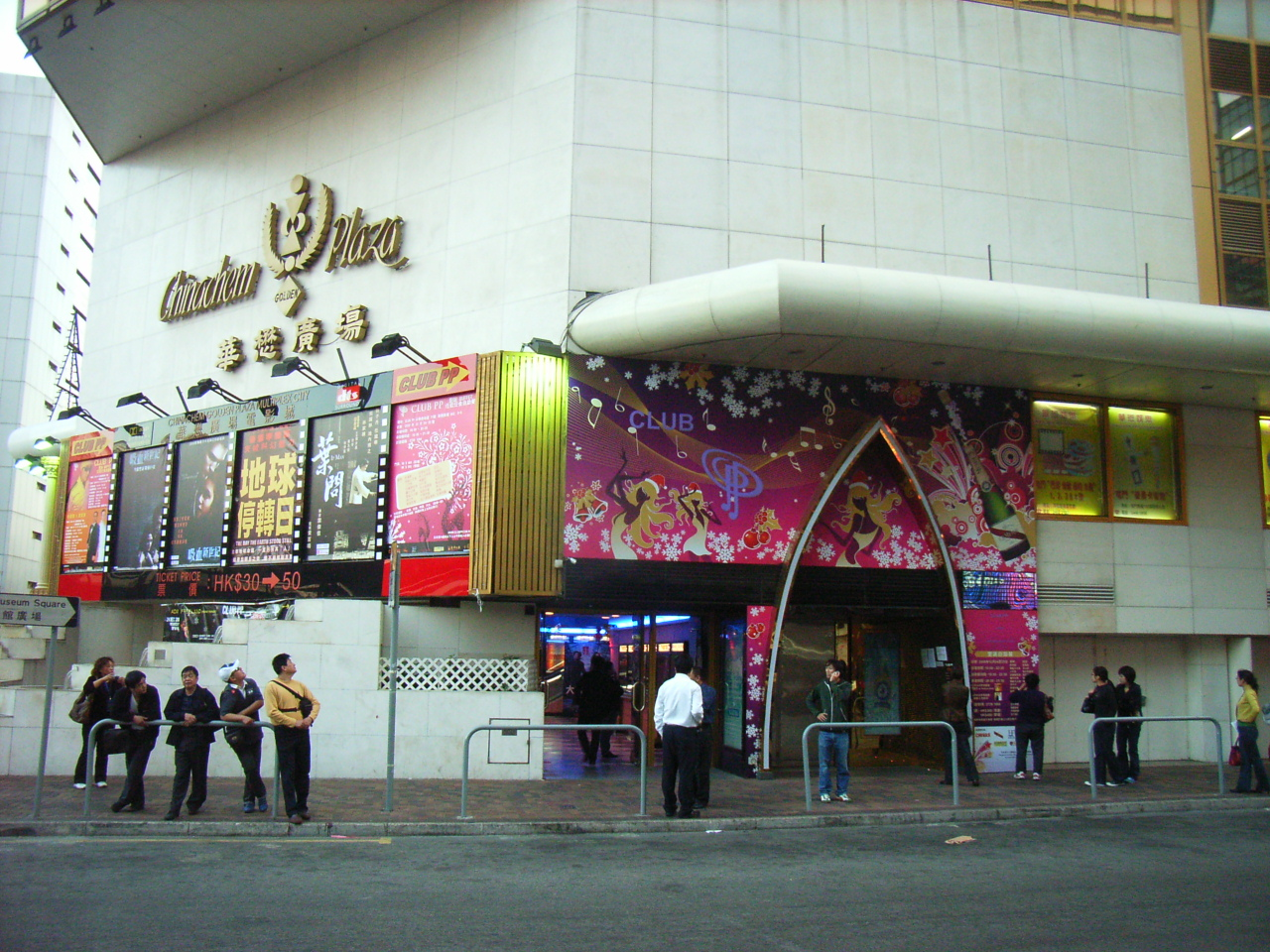
Former Chinachem Golden Plaza

- Paris London New York Milano Cinema, at Hong Lai Garden, Tuen Mun

Former cinemas

- Chinachem Golden Plaza, in East Tsim Sha Tsui; opened in February, 1988, closed in May 2013

== Emperor Cinemas ==
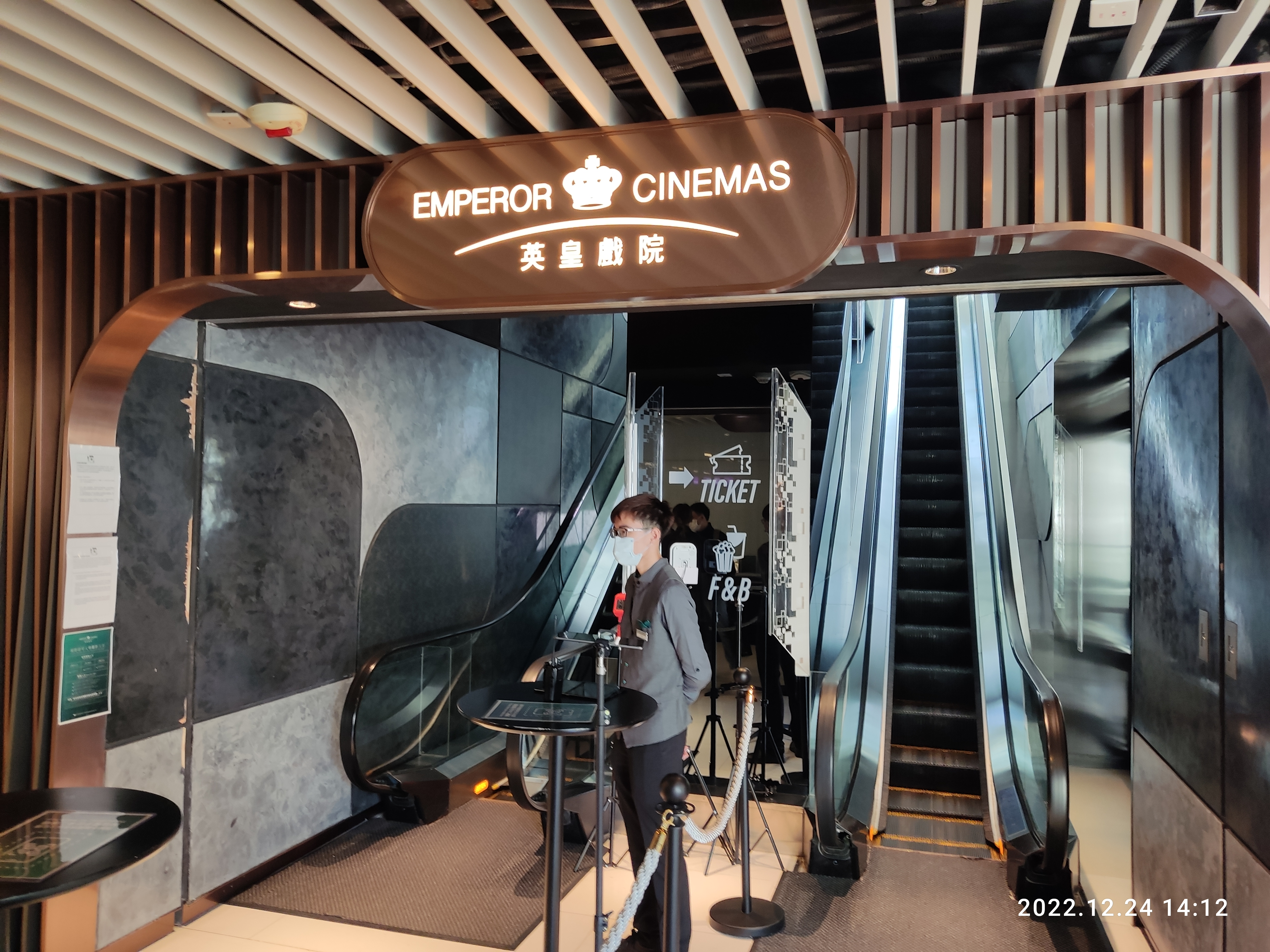
iSQUARE

- Citywalk, replacing GH Citywalk
- Emperor Cinemas Plus+ (Tai Wai), The Wai shopping mall, Tai Wai
- Entertainment Building, Queen's Road Central and D'Aguilar Street, Central
- iSQUARE; replacing UA Cinemas
- Ma On Shan Emperor Cinema, in Sunshine City, Ma On Shan
- The Lohas
- Times Square, replacing CINE TIMES
- Tuen Mun Emperor Cinema, New Town Commercial Arcade, 2 Tuen Lee Street, Tuen Mun, in New Town Mansion Shopping Arcade
- The Southside, at Wong Chuk Hang

== MCL Cinemas ==
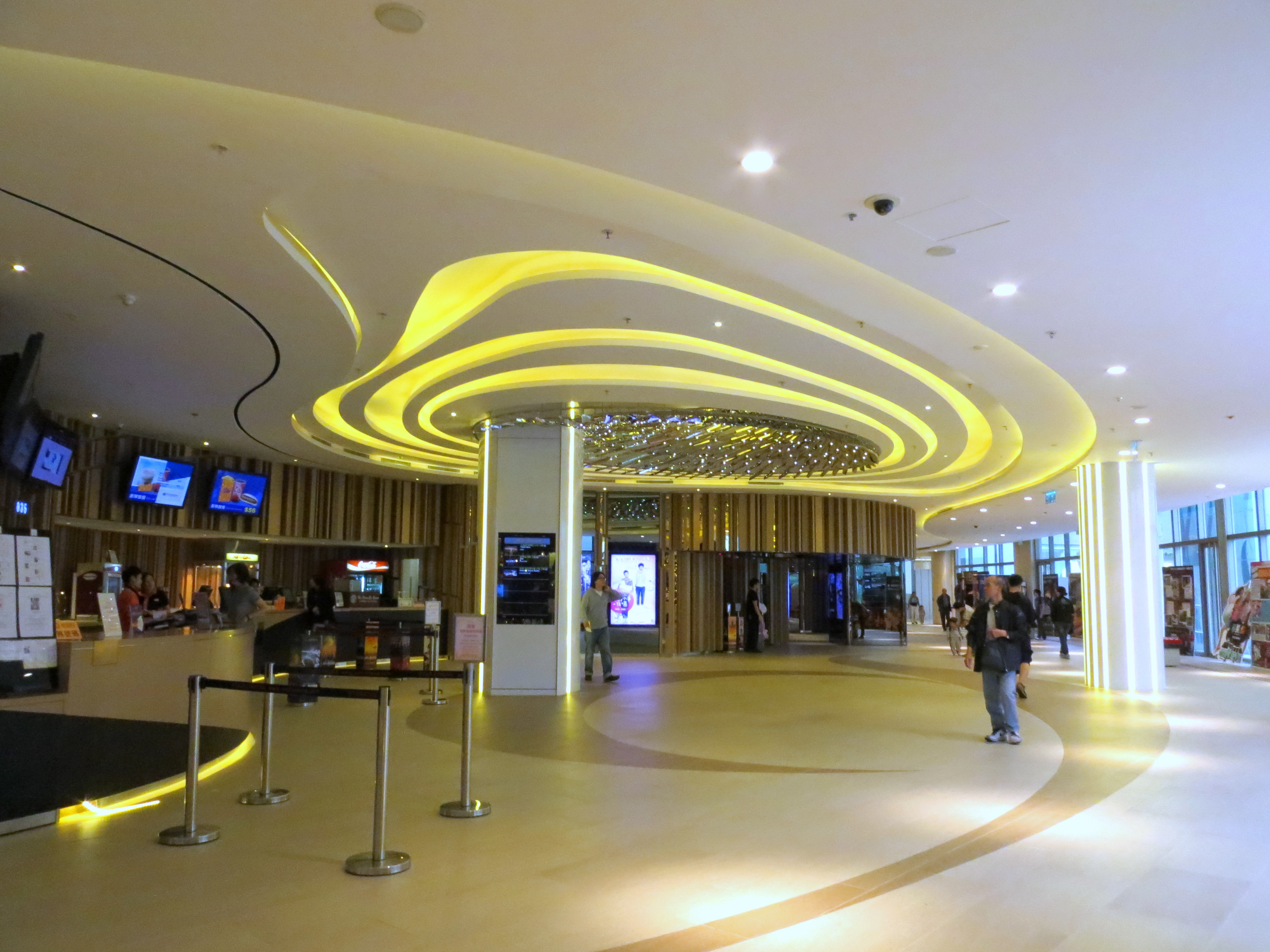
STAR Cinema

In addition to operating its own brand, MCL Cinemas also operates Star Cinema and the Movie Town chains.

- MCL Amoy, at Amoy Plaza
- MCL K11 Art House, at K11 MUSEA
- MCL Metro Cinema, at Metro City, Phase 2
- MCL Telford Cinema, at Telford Gardens
- MCL Cyberport, at Cyberport
- STAR Cinema, at PopCorn, Tseung Kwan O
- Grand Windsor Cinema, at Windsor House, Causeway Bay
- MCL Cheung Sha Wan Cinema, at Lai Sun Commercial Centre, Cheung Sha Wan
- MCL Citygate, at Citygate Outlets, Tung Chung
- MCL Festival Grand Cinema, at Festival Walk, Kowloon Tong
- MCL Airside, at Airside, Kai Tak
- MCL The ONE, at The ONE
- MCL GREEN CODE, at Green Code Plaza, Fanling

Former cinemas

- The Grand Cinema, at Elements Mall (site acquired by Broadway and rebranded as Premiere Elements)
- MCL JP Cinema, at JP Plaza, Causeway Bay; succeeded by Cinema City Causeway Bay
- MCL Kornhill Cinema, at Kornhill Plaza
- MCL South Horizons Cinema, at South Horizons
- MCL 4D Extreme Screen, at Terminal 2, Hong Kong International Airport; succeeded by UA Cinema @ Airport
- MCL Hollywood, at Plaza Hollywood; succeeded by CineArt Hollywood

== Newport Circuit ==
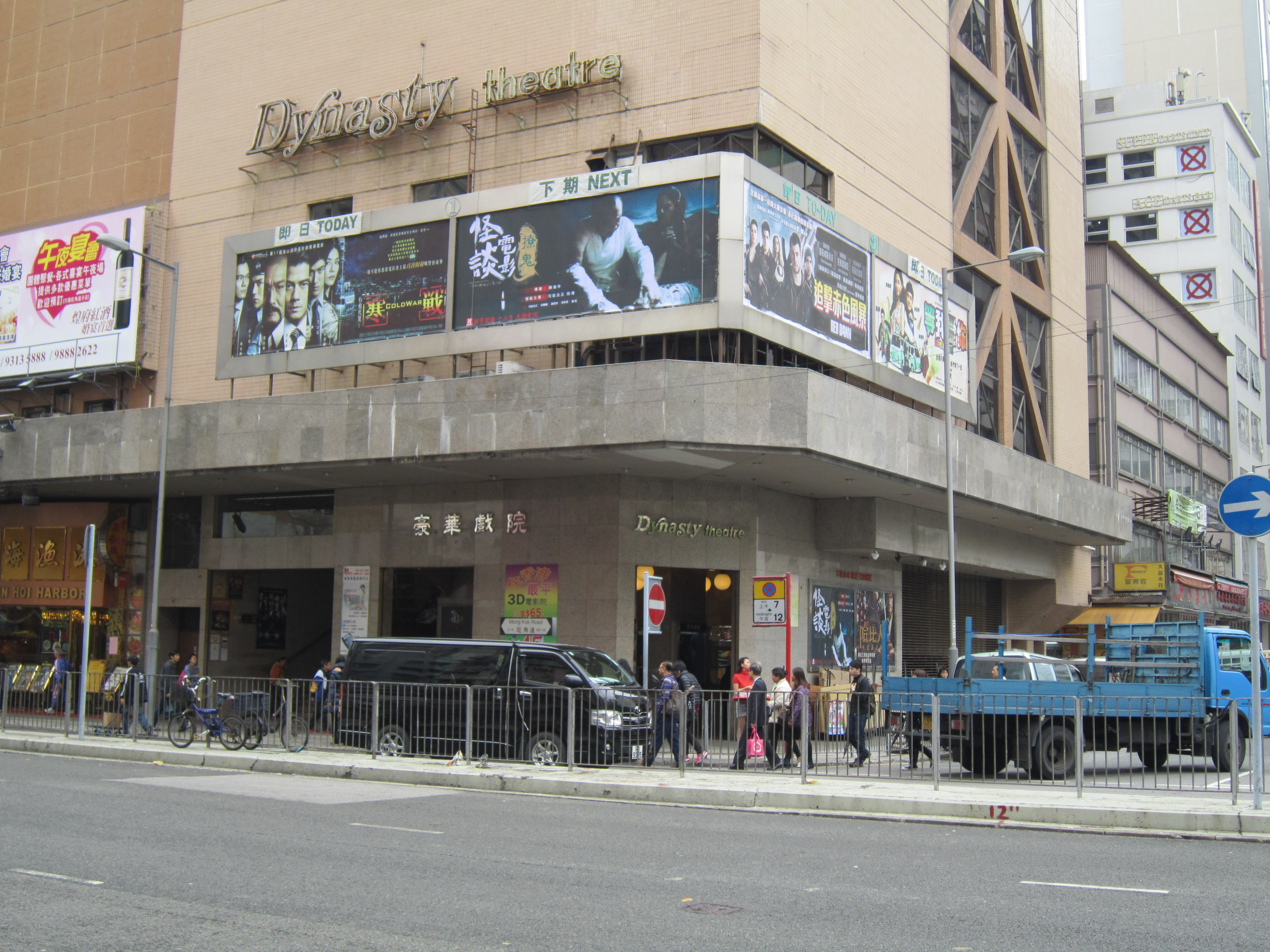
Dynasty Theatre in Mong Kok Road

- Hyland Theatre, on Heung Sze Wui Road, Tuen Mun

Former cinemas

- Century Theatre
- Dynasty Theatre, on Mong Kok Road, Mong Kok
- Newport Theatre, on Soy Street, Mong Kok
- President Theatre, on Jaffe Road, Causeway Bay

== Shanghai Xingyi Cinema ==
- the sky, at Olympian City 2
- StagE, at Tuen Mun Town Plaza
- Tai Po Mega Mall

== Mandarin Motion Pictures Ltd ==
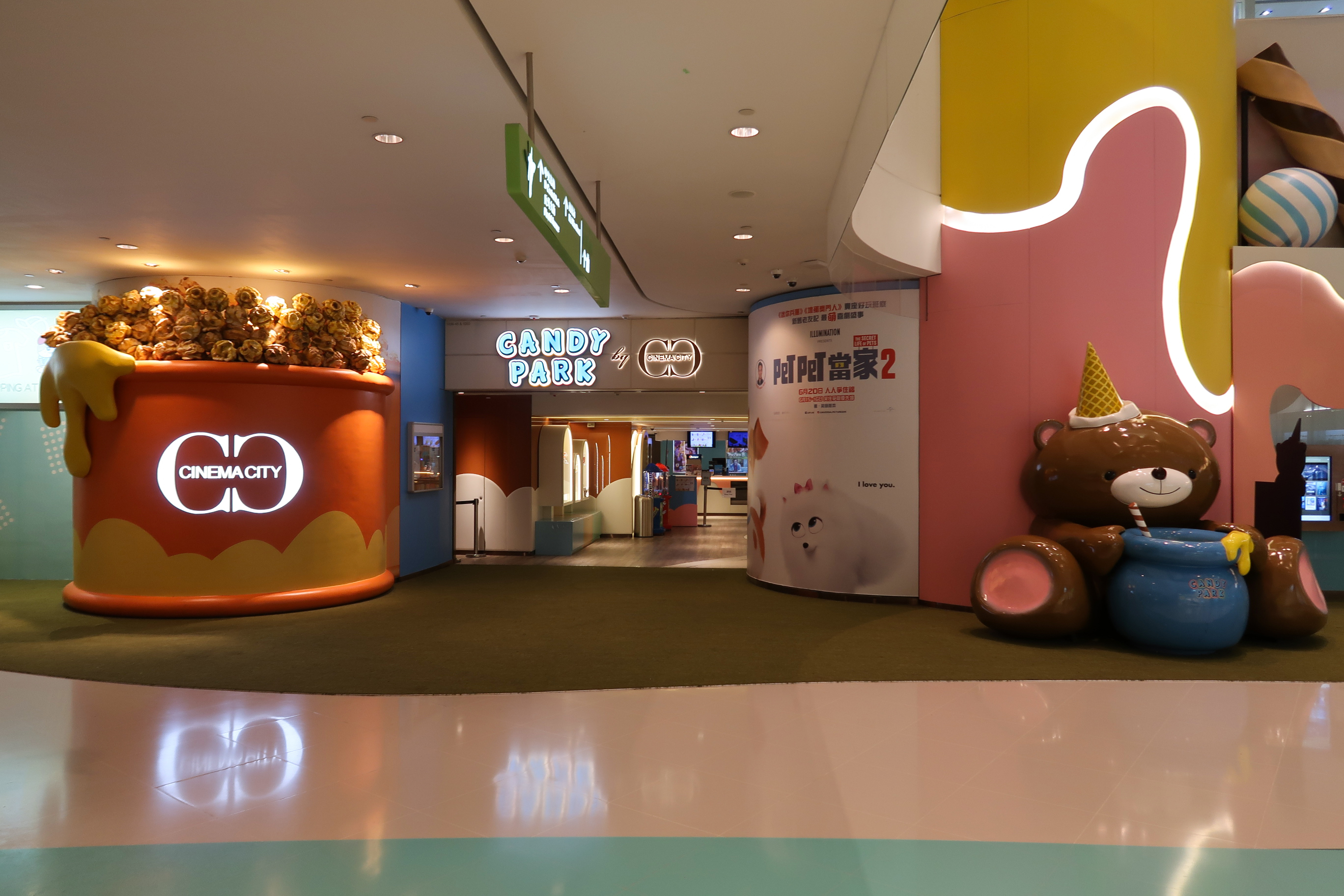
Candy Park by Cinema City

- Candy Park by Cinema City, at D·Park
- Cinema City Chai Wan, at Winner Centre

Former cinemas

- Cinema City Mong Kok, at Langham Place; succeeded by Broadway GALA CINEMA
- Cinema City Causeway Bay, at Jade & Pearl Plaza; succeeded by CineArt JP
- Metroplex by Cinema City, at E-MAX
- Cinema City Victoria, at Sugar Street, Hong Kong

== CineArt Cinema ==
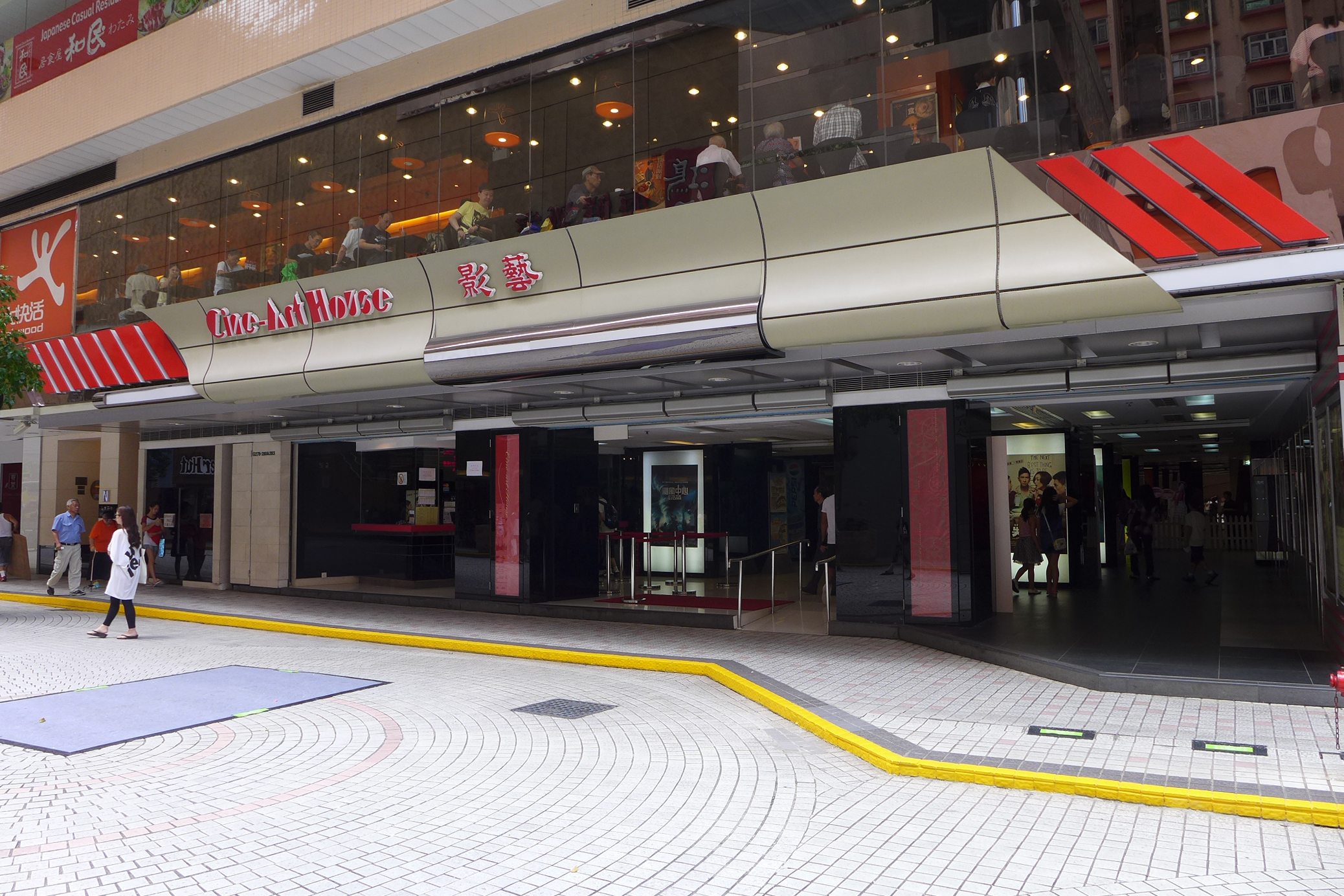
Former Cine-Art House at Amoy Plaza

- Cine-Art House, at Maritime Plaza, Tsing Yi
- CineArt JP, at Jade & Pearl Plaza
- CineArt Megabox
- CineArt Hollywood

Former cinemas

- Cine-Art House, at Amoy Plaza, Amoy Gardens; established in 1988 at the ground floor of Sun Hung Kai Centre, in Wan Chai; closed in 2006 and reopened in 2009 within Amoy Garden Shopping Arcade before its closure in 2018.
- Cine-Art House, at Kowloon City Plaza, closed on 26 August 2024.

== UA Cinemas ==
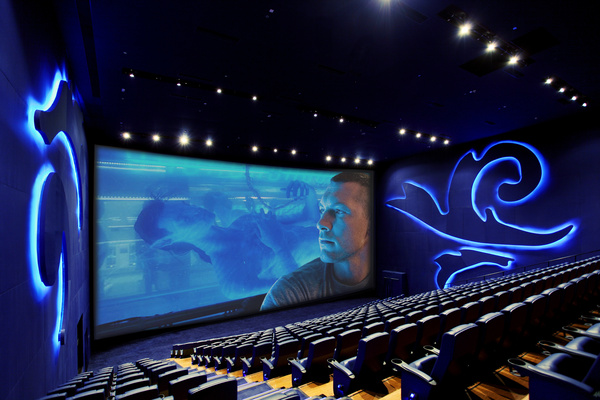
Interior of UA iSQUARE IMAX theatre

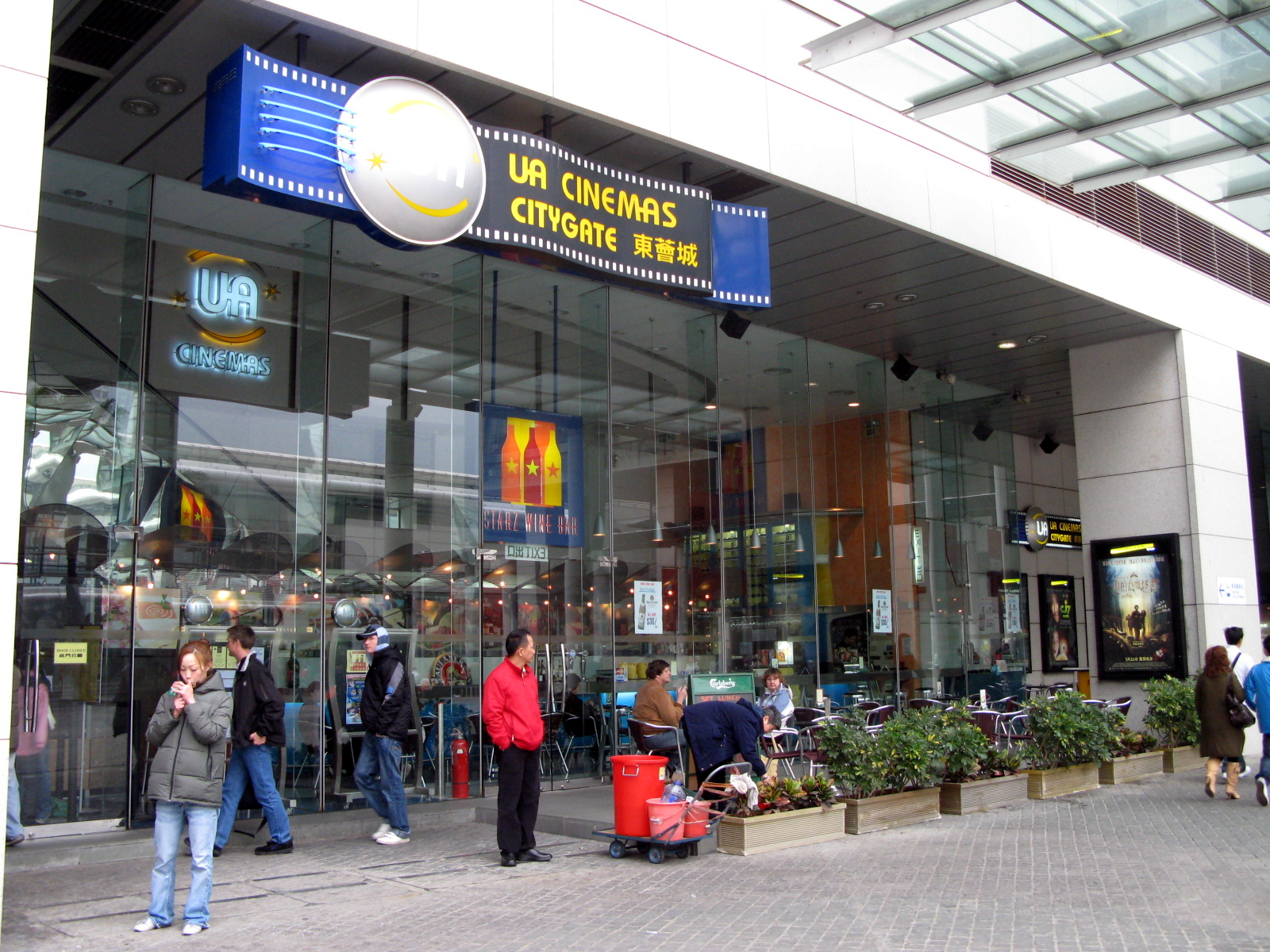
Former UA Citygate

The UA Cinemas brand in Hong Kong is not related to the United Artists Theaters chain in the United States, which is owned by Regal Cinemas.

On 8 March 2021, UA Cinemas announced that the business will cease business with immediate effect due to unavoidable and devastating pressure faced by the business since the outbreak of the coronavirus pandemic.

Former cinemas

- UA Langham Place, succeeded by Cinema City
- UA Pacific Place, at Pacific Place; closed on 27 January 2006, succeeded by AMC Pacific Place
- UA Telford, succeeded by MCL Telford
- UA Times Square, at Times Square; opened in December 1993, closed in February 2012; the site was replaced by a Louis Vuitton store, and the UA theater was relocated to the 12th to 14th floor of the mall, renamed as CINE TIMES, opened in November 2013. Closed in March 2021, it was succeeded by Emperor Cinemas.
- UA Whampoa, opened in May 1985, closed in October 2009; succeeded by GH Whampoa
- Windsor Cinema, at Windsor House, Causeway Bay; closed in September 2015, succeeded by MCL Grand Windsor Cinema
- UA Cityplaza, at Cityplaza; closed on 23 February 2017, succeeded by MOViE MOViE by Broadway Circuit.
- UA TMT Plaza, at Tuen Mun Town Plaza; closed on 10 March 2018, succeeded by StagE by Golden Harvest.
- UA Shatin, at New Town Plaza; opened in 1985 as the first UA cinema in Hong Kong; closed in June 2018, succeeded by MCL Movie Town
- UA Cinema @ Airport, at Terminal 2, Hong Kong International Airport; houses the third (chronologically) IMAX theater in Hong Kong; closed in 2019 due closure of Hong Kong International Airport Terminal 2
- UA Maritime, at Maritime Square; closed March 2021, succeeded by CineArt House
- UA K11 Art House, at K11 MUSEA; closed February 2021; revived by MCL
- UA Cine Moko, at MOKO-Grand Century Place, Mong Kok; closed March 2021, succeeded by B+ by Broadway Circuit.
- UA iSQUARE, at iSQUARE; houses the second (chronologically) IMAX theater in Hong Kong; closed March 2021, succeeded by Emperor Cinemas
- UA MegaBox, at MegaBox; houses the first (chronologically) IMAX theater in Hong Kong; closed March 2021, succeeded by GH Megabox
- UA Citygate, at Citygate Outlets; closed temporarily on 18 September 2016 for renovations; closed March 2021, succeeded By MCL Citygate
- UA Amoy, at Amoy Plaza; closed March 2021, succeeded By MCL Amoy

== Orange Sky Golden Harvest ==
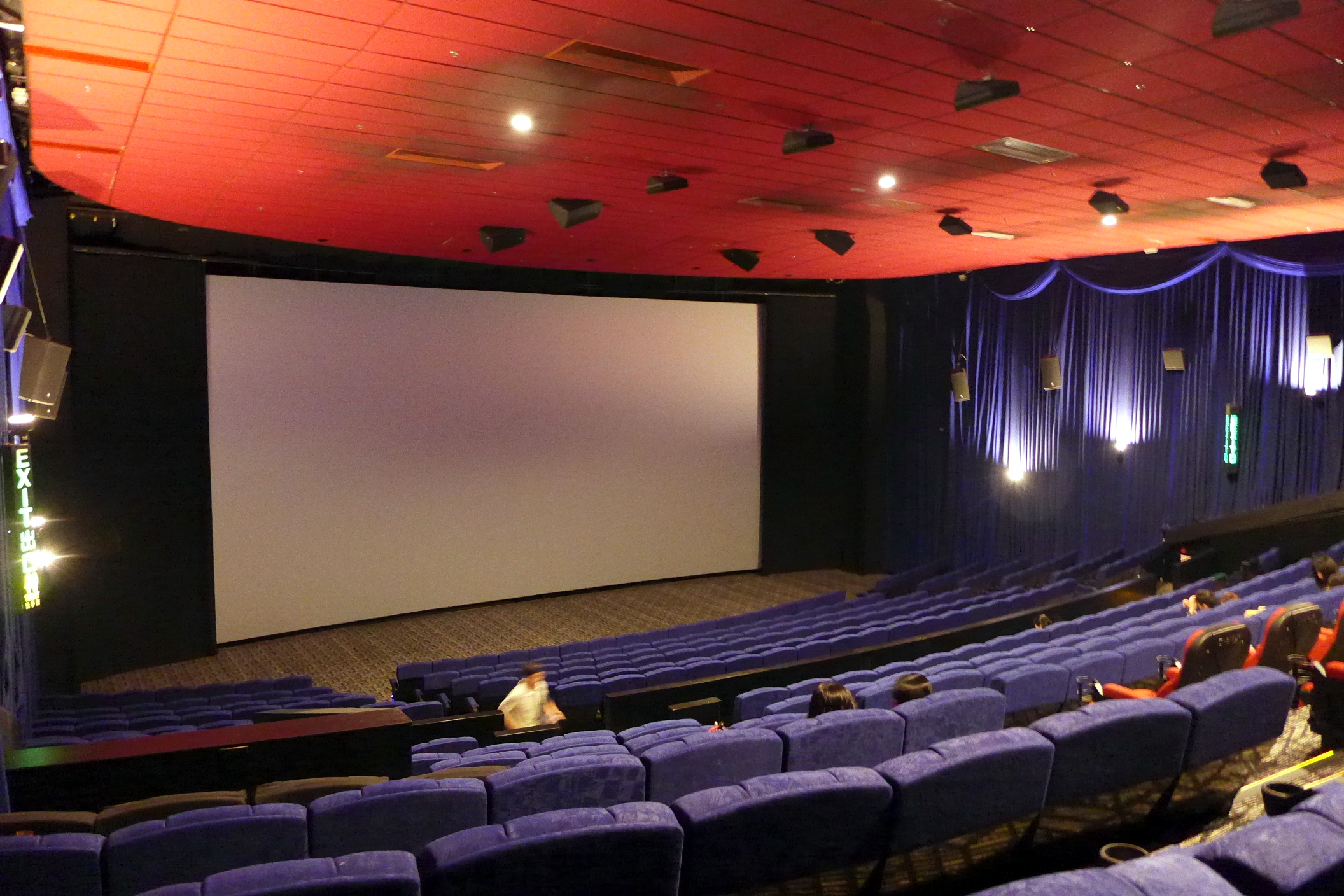
Interior of Grand Ocean theatre, where it closed on 2 June 2025.

On 27 June 2025, Orange Sky Golden Harvest announced the discontinuing of all cinema operations in Hong Kong.

Former cinemas

- the sky, at Olympian City 2
- StagE, at Tuen Mun Town Plaza
- GH Tai Po, at Tai Po Mega Mall
- GH Galaxy Plaza, at Galaxy Plaza Shau Kei Wan
- GH Hollywood, at Plaza Hollywood; closed on 31 March 2011; became Broadway Hollywood
- GH Mongkok, at Grand Century Place, 193 Prince Edward Road West - now B+ MOKO.
- Golden Gateway, at The Gateway, Harbour City.; Originally named Harbour City Cinema, opened in 1994, closed on 14 February 2016 (Operation focused on Grand Ocean, also located in the same Harbour City precinct, which closed in June 2025)
- GH Tsing Yi, at Maritime Square; closed on 3 January 2018; succeeded by UA Maritime
- GH Citywalk, at Citywalk 2, Tsuen Wan; succeeded by Emperor Cinemas
- Grand Ocean, at Ocean Centre Harbour City, Tsim Sha Tsui; originally named Ocean Theatre, opened in 1957, closed on 2 June 2025, the longest operated cinema in the chain to date.
- GH Fanling, at Fanling Town Centre
- GH Whampoa, at Whampoa Plaza, Whampoa Garden; closed on 10 April 2025, succeeded by Sun Kwong Chinese Opera Theatre
- GH Megabox, at MegaBox;closed on 8 June 2025, succeeded by CineArt MegaBox

== Other cinemas ==
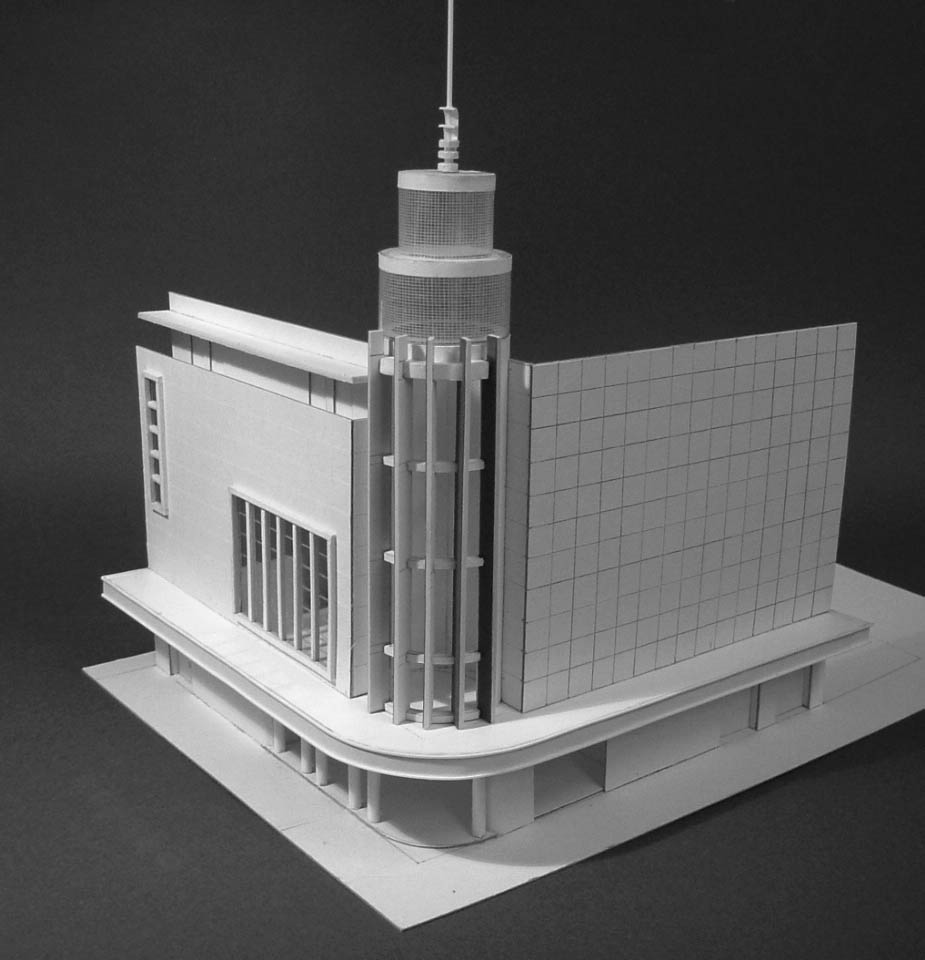
1/150 scale model of the former Capitol Theatre

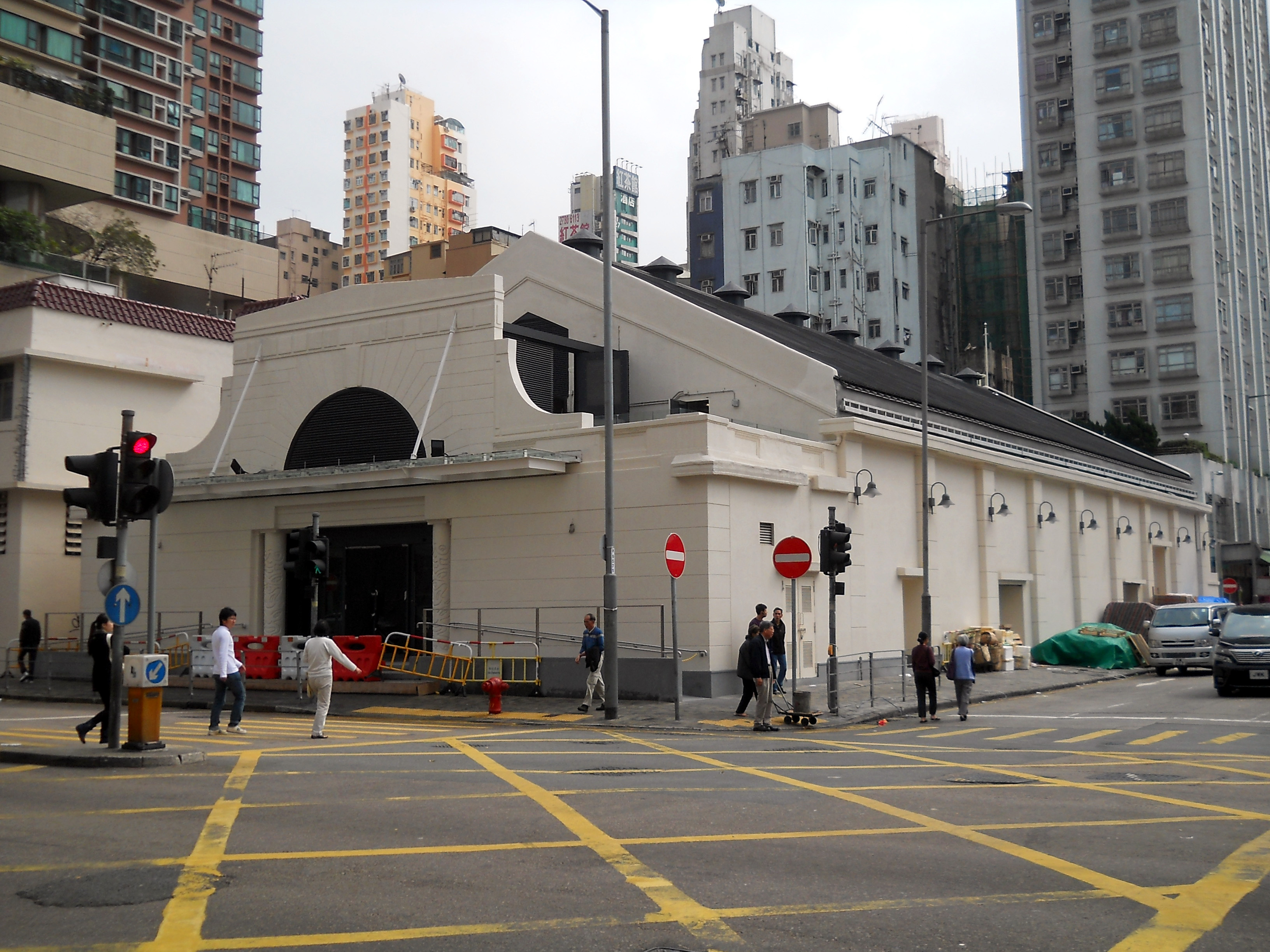
Yau Ma Tei Theatre in 2012

- Hong Kong Film Archive
- Louis Koo Cinema, Hong Kong Arts Centre, renamed in 2018, a cosy cinema with 119 seats
- Lux Theatre, on Bulkeley Street, Hung Hom; opened in 1971, now owned by CJ CGV
- Golden Scene Cinema, at North Street, Kennedy Town
- Stanley Ho Space Theatre, within the Hong Kong Space Museum
- CGV Cinemas D2 Place, at Lai Chi Kok

== Former cinemas ==
- Astor Theatre / Po Hing Theatre (普慶戲院). Kowloon's first cinema. Now the location of the Eaton Hotel.
- Brightly Star, 1992 - 2008
- Capitol Theatre (京華戲院), Jardine's Bazaar, Causeway Bay; opened in 1952, closed in 1977
- Cheung Chau Theatre, on Cheung Chau; opened in 1931, closed in the 1990s. Grade III historic building
- East Town Theatre (東城戲院), Wanchai
- Fanling Town Centre Cinema, in Fanling; opened in 1993, closed in 2006
- First Theatre (第一戲院), Public Square Street, 1925–1960s.
- Golden Valley Theatre (金茂坪戲院), Hiu Kwong Street, Sau Mau Ping; opened in 1978, closed in 1992
- Hong Kong Opera House (香江大舞台) [2005-2008], No.4 Wah Lok Path. Formerly Fortuna Theatre (華富閣戲院) [1979-2000]
- Hoover Theatre (豪華戲院) on Yee Wo Street, Hong Kong 1954 - 1981
- Isis Theatre (新都戲院), Moreton Terrace, Causeway Bay; opened in 1966, closed in 1999.
- King's Theatre (娛樂戲院) at 34 Queen's Road Central, Central. 31 March 1931 - 1 January 1990
- Ko Shing Theatre (高陞戲園/戲院), Sheung Wan (1870‐1970s). Hong Kong's second indoor opera‐cum‐movie theatre
- Kwong Chee Theatre (廣智戲院), Temple Street / Kansu Street, 1919–1968. First cinema in Yau Ma Tei.
- Kwong Ming Theatre (光明戲院), Public Square Street, 1930-1960s.
- Kwun Chung Theatre, at 30 Kwun Chung Street, Kwun Chung; was Hong Kong's last adult cinema until it closed on 15 March 2011
- Lee Theatre; opened in 1927, closed in 1991.
- Liberty Theatre [1949-1997] Corner Temple Street & Jordan Road
- London Theatre at Corner Austin Road and Nathan Road, Jordan /倫敦大戲院 [1962-1988]
- Lung Wah Theatre, at 117 Chung On Street, Tsuen Wan; opened in 1962; closed in 1996
- Majestic Cinema (大華戲院) Nathan Road / Saigon Street, 1928 ‐1940s/1940s– 1988/1992– 20004.
- Nanyang Theatre (南洋戲院), Morrison Hill Road, Wan Chai; opened in 1966, closed in 1989
- Odeon Cinema (國賓戲院), North Point
- Olympia Theatre (國都戲院), Power Street, North Point; opened in 1965, closed in 1995
- Oriental Theatre (東方戲院), Wanchai
- Park Theatre (百樂戲院), Tung Lo Wan Road, Causeway Bay; opened in 1970, closed in 1997.
- Palace Theatre at 280 Gloucester Road, Causeway Bay, Hong Kong 14 November 1979 - 25 April 1994 Record 18-month run of "Somewhere In Time"
- Peng Chau Theatre (坪洲戲院), Peng Chau; opened in 1978, closed in the late 1980s
- Queen's Theatre (皇后戲院), at the corner of Queen's Road Central and Theatre Lane, opened in 1924, closed for reconstruction in 1958, reopened in 1961, closed in 2007; the site is now occupied by LHT Tower
- Rialto Theatre (麗都戲院), Wanchai
- Royal Cinema, closed in 2007
- Silver Star Cinema, closed in 1999
- Silver Theatre (銀都戲院), in Kwun Tong; opened in 1963, closed in 2009; the building was demolished in 2013
- State Theatre (皇都戲院), in North Point; operated from 1959 to 1997; formerly the Empire Theatre, which operated from 1952 to 1957
- Sunbeam Cinema, closed on 3 March 2025.
- Tai Ping Theatre (太平戲院)
- Tuen Mun Cinema, closed in 2008 due to renovation in Tuen Mun Town Plaza
- Tung Hing Theatre (同慶戲園/戲院) (1867‐1910s). Hong Kong's first indoor opera‐cum‐movie theatre
- Universal Theatre / 民樂戲院 Located at Bowring Street, Jordan [1967-1995]
- Washington Theatre, later renamed Golden Harvest GH Washington Theatre 1971 - 1993 at 92-98 Parkes Street, Yaumatei
- Yau Ma Tei Theatre, opened in the late 1920s, closed in 1988
- Yuen Long Cinema, on Yuen Long Pau Cheung Square, closed in 2020
- L Cinema, on Mong Lung Street, Shau Kei Wan; opened on 8 February 2016 and closed on 8 August 2020. Succeeded by GH Galaxy.
