= Peng Chau Theatre =

Coordinates: 22°17′02.3″N 114°02′22.6″E

- 坪洲戲院
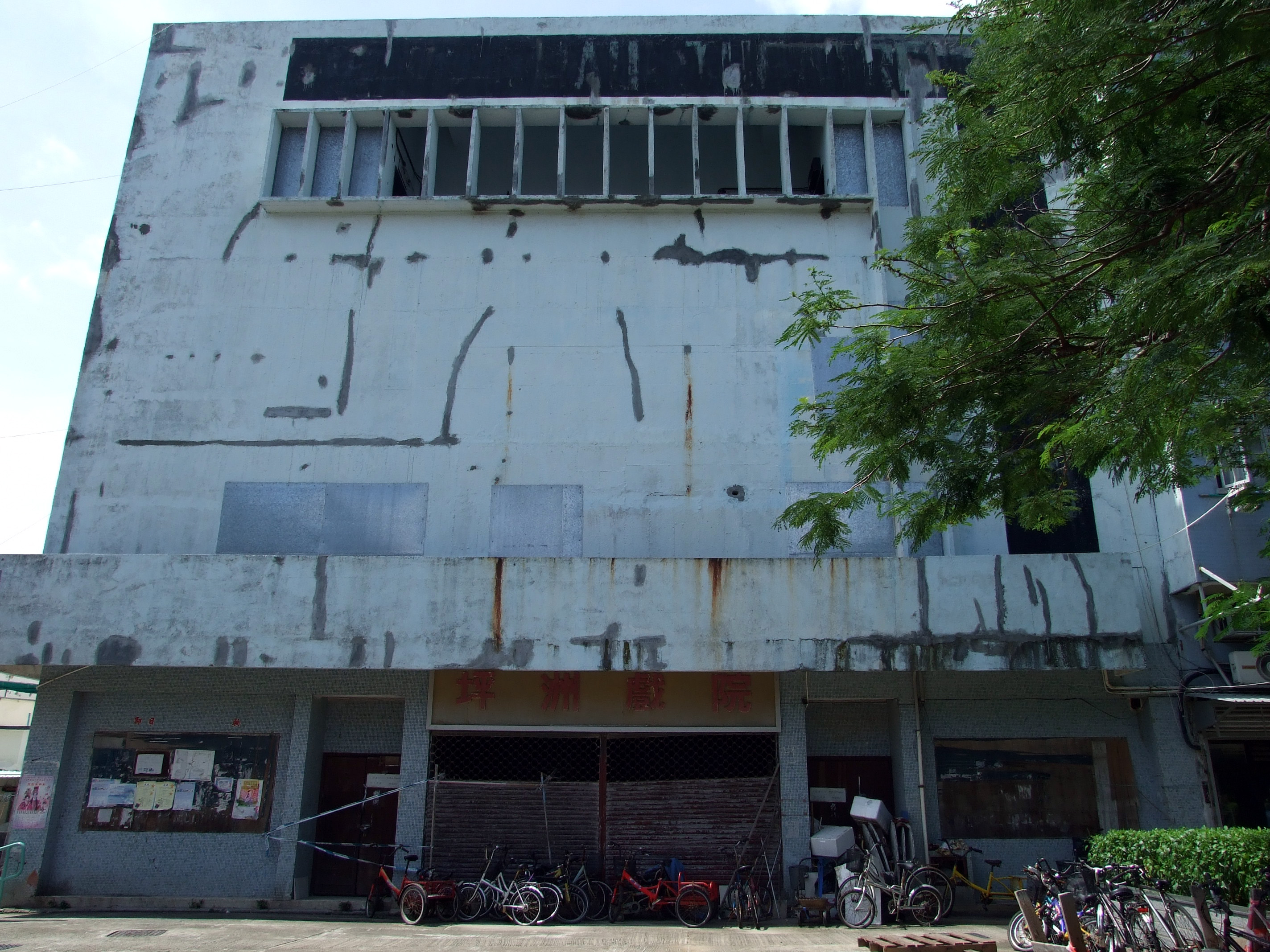
- Former Peng Chau Theatre, a neighbourhood cinema situated in Peng Chau.
- Interactive map of the Peng Chau Theatre area

General information
- Status: Closed
- Type: Cinema
- Location: 15 Wai Tsai Street, Peng Chau, Hong Kong
- Opened: 2 February 1978
- Closed: 1 January 1988 (Estimated)
- Owner: Far East Consortium International Limited

Peng Chau Theatre
- Traditional Chinese: 坪洲戲院
Transcriptions
Yue: Cantonese
- Yale Romanization: Pìhng jāu hei yuhn
- Jyutping: Ping4 zau1 hei3 jyun6

Peng Chau Theatre is a defunct cinema on the island of Peng Chau in Hong Kong.

== History ==
The cinema was inaugurated on the eve of the Lunar New Year (6 February), 1978 by Deacon Chiu Te Ken (邱德根) of the Far East Consortium International Limited. The opening ceremony was officiated by John Rawling Todd (杜迪) who was Acting Secretary for the New Territories at the time. The first film to show in the theatre was Gang of Four (四二八).

== Operation ==
The cinema had a seating capacity of 499.

== Decline ==
Due to the decline of industry on Peng Chau and the subsequent decline in population, coupled with the increased popularity of at-home entertainment during the 1970s and 80s, the cinema fell into disuse and was shuttered in the late 1980s. On 8 September 2016 the Antiquities Advisory Board reviewed the heritage grading of the building and declined to give the building a heritage grade.

== See also ==
- List of cinemas in Hong Kong
