= Cheung Chau Theatre =

Former cinema in Cheung Chau, Hong Kong

Coordinates: 22.209331°N 114.029392°E

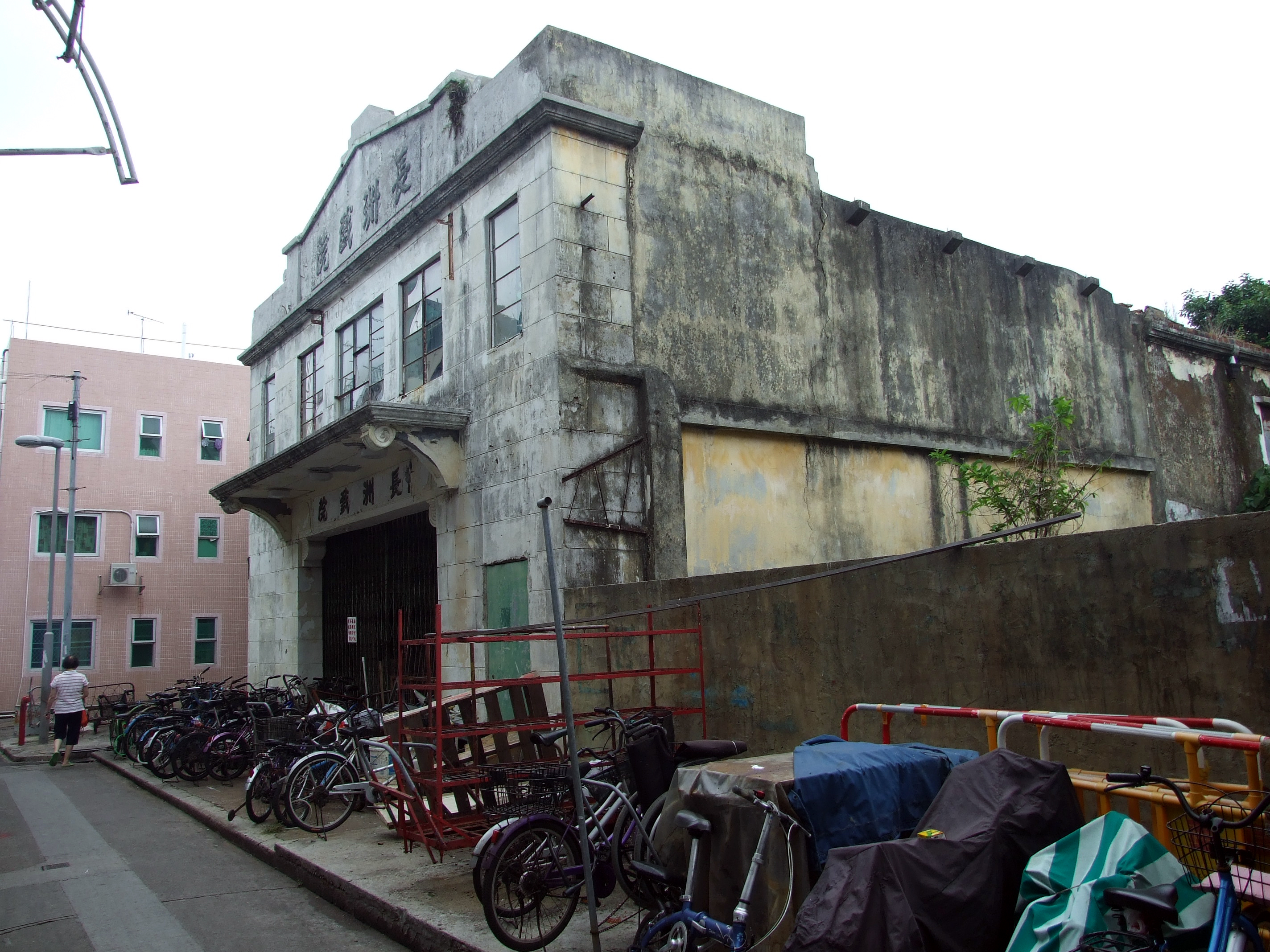
Cheung Chau Theatre in 2010

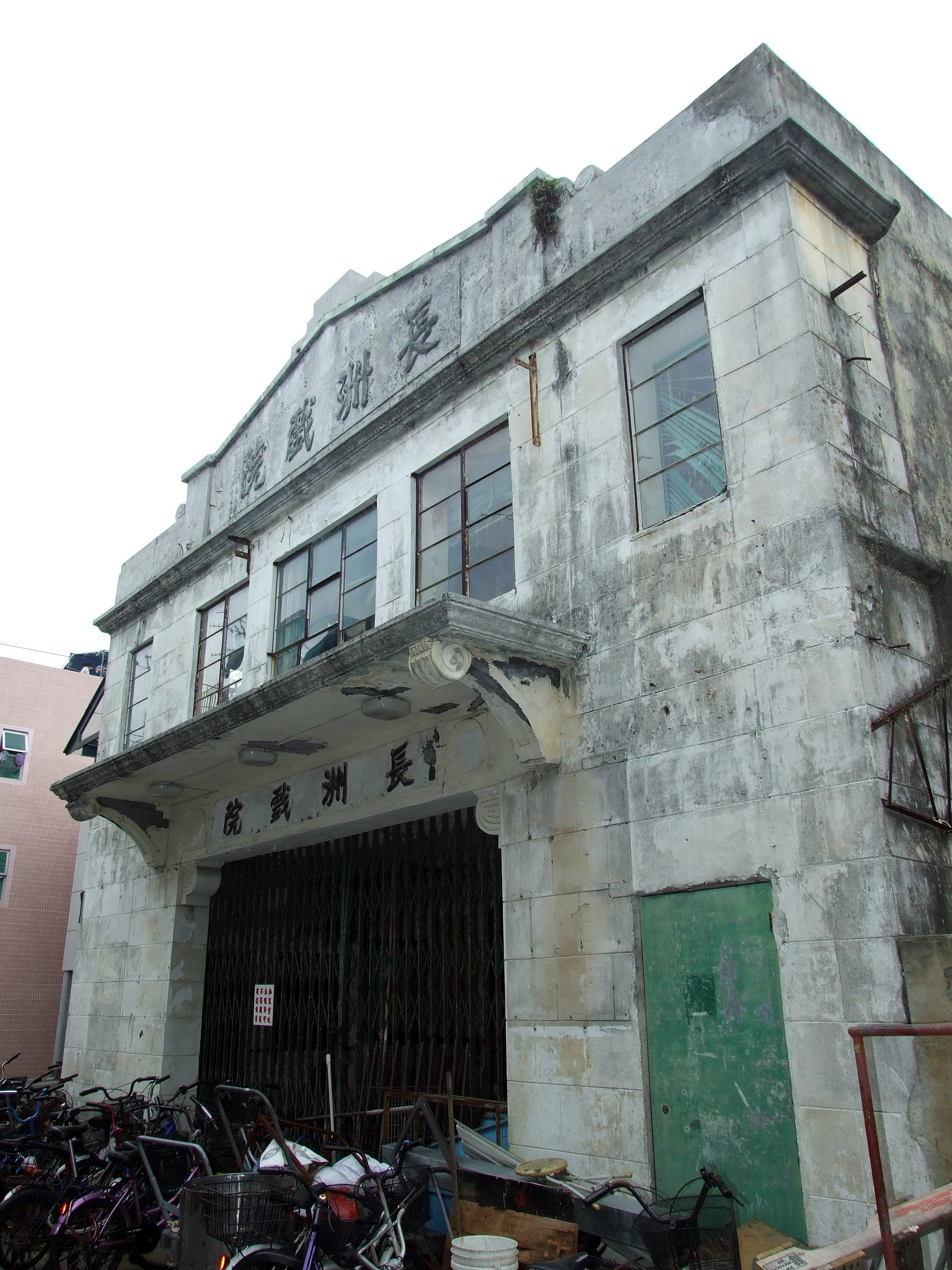
Cheung Chau Theatre in 2010

Cheung Chau Theatre (Chinese: 長洲戲院) is a former cinema in Cheung Chau, Hong Kong.

== History ==
Built and opened in 1931, the theater operated as a cinema until 1997.

In 2023, the property was reopened to the public as a multicultural space called Cheung Chau Cinema.

== Conservation ==
Cheung Chau Theatre is listed as a Grade III historic building.

== See also ==
- List of cinemas in Hong Kong
