= LHT Tower =

Building in Central, Hong Kong

Coordinates: 22.282073°N 114.15654°E

- 陸海通大廈
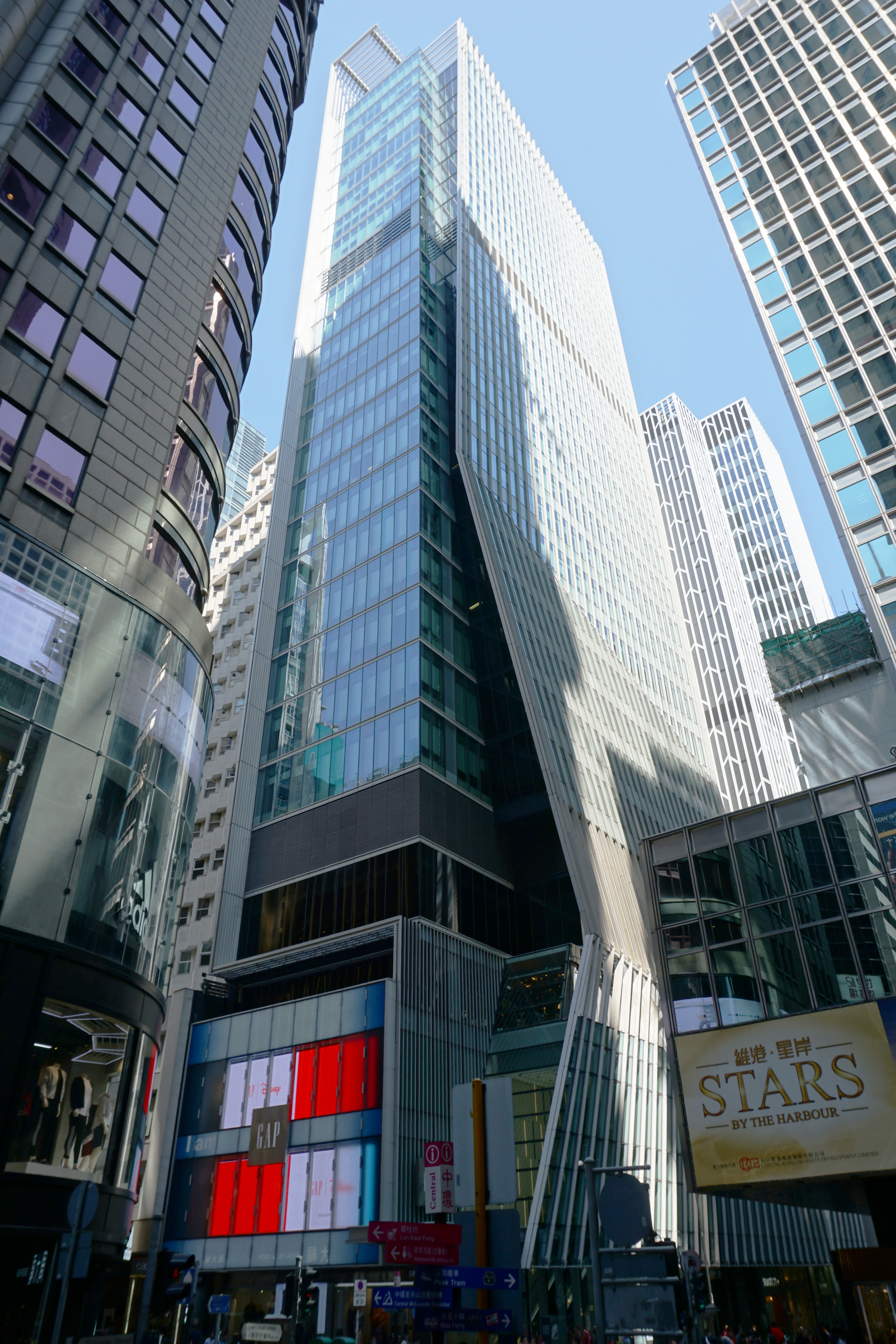
- Interactive map of the LHT Tower area

General information
- Status: Completed
- Type: Office
- Location: 31 Queen's Road Central, Central, Hong Kong
- Completed: November 2011; 14 years ago
- Owner: The Luk Hoi Tong Company

Height
- Height: 130.6 m (428 ft)

Technical details
- Floor count: 28
- Lifts/elevators: 6

Design and construction
- Architect: Rocco Design Architects

LHT Tower
- Traditional Chinese: 陸海通大廈
- Simplified Chinese: 陆海通大厦
Transcriptions
Standard Mandarin
- Hanyu Pinyin: Lù Hǎi Tōng Dàshà
Yue: Cantonese
- Jyutping: luk6 hoi2 tung1 daai6 haa6

LHT Tower or Luk Hoi Tong Building (Chinese: 陸海通大廈; Jyutping: luk6 hoi2 tung1 daai6 haa6) is an office building and shopping mall at 31 Queen's Road Central, Central, Hong Kong. It is directly adjacent to MTR Central station. It was opened in November 2011.

== History ==
LHT Tower was constructed at the former site of the Queen's Theatre. It is owned by The Luk Hoi Tong Company Limited. In 2008, the old building was demolished to be redeveloped.

== Architect and construction ==
It is designed by Rocco Design Architects Limited, Gammon Construction Limited was awarded the contract for the redevelopment. The property is managed by Jones Lang LaSalle.

== Building ==
Luk Hoi Tong Building comprises a 28-storey mixed office and retail tower with a gross floor area of 21,000 square metres, spreading over 21 floors of office, two levels of mechanical floor, a three-level podium retails, a basement floor and two dining floors. The site was originally occupied by the old Queen's Theatre in 1925 and was later developed into an office cum cinema building in 1961.

== Tenants ==
Gap occupies 15,000 square feet of office space in the redeveloped LHT Tower on Queen's Road Central in November, with Swatch taking a smaller store in the same building.
