= Yu Kee Food =

Hong Kong supermarket chain

Yu Kee Food Company Limited 裕記食品批發有限公司
- Company type: Privately owned company
- Industry: Supermarket
- Founded: 1990
- Defunct: 2011
- Headquarters: Hong Kong
- Area served: Hong Kong
- Website: Yu Kee Food Company Limited

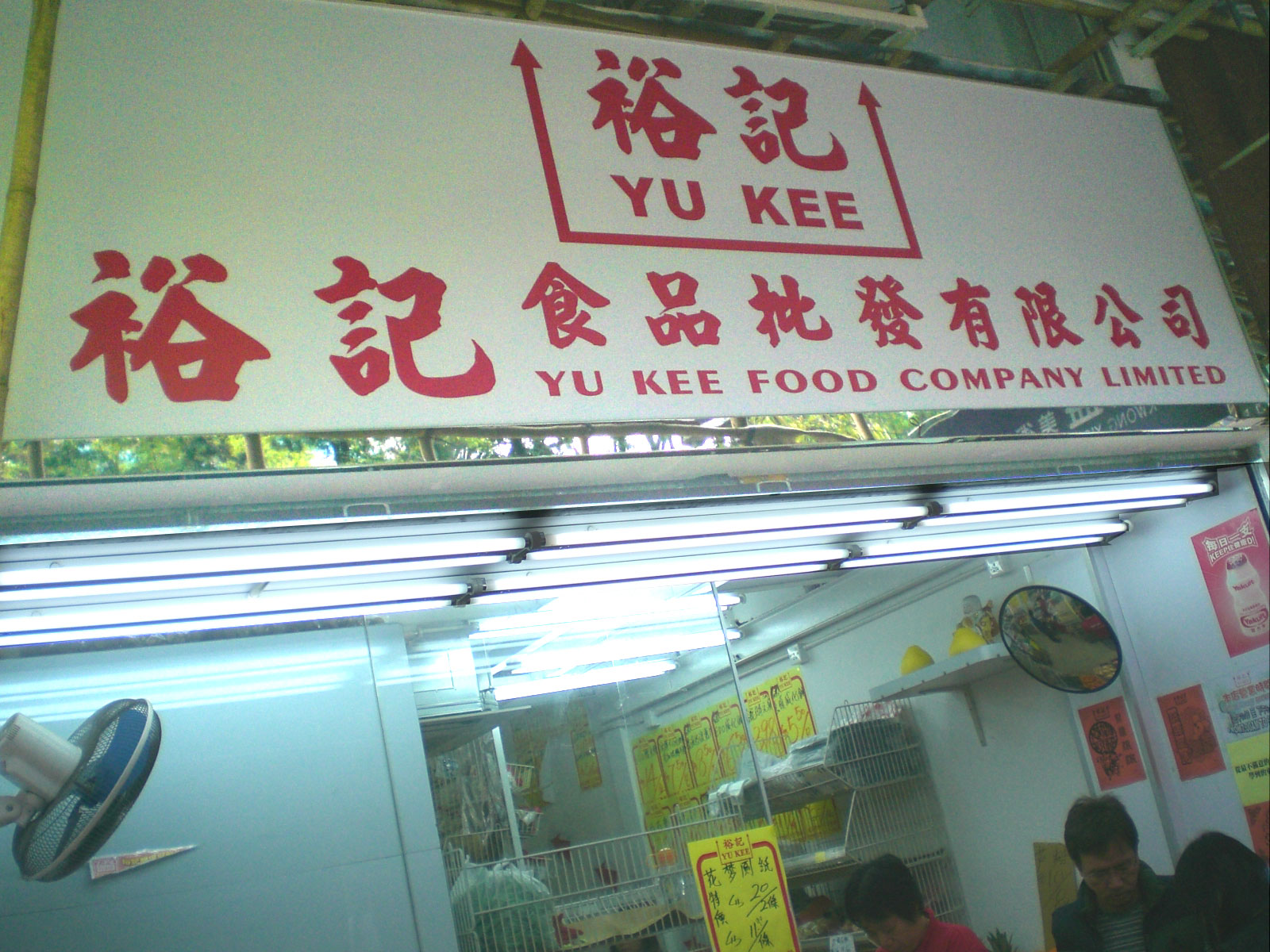
Yue Kee Store in Sai Yee Street, Mong Kok, Kowloon

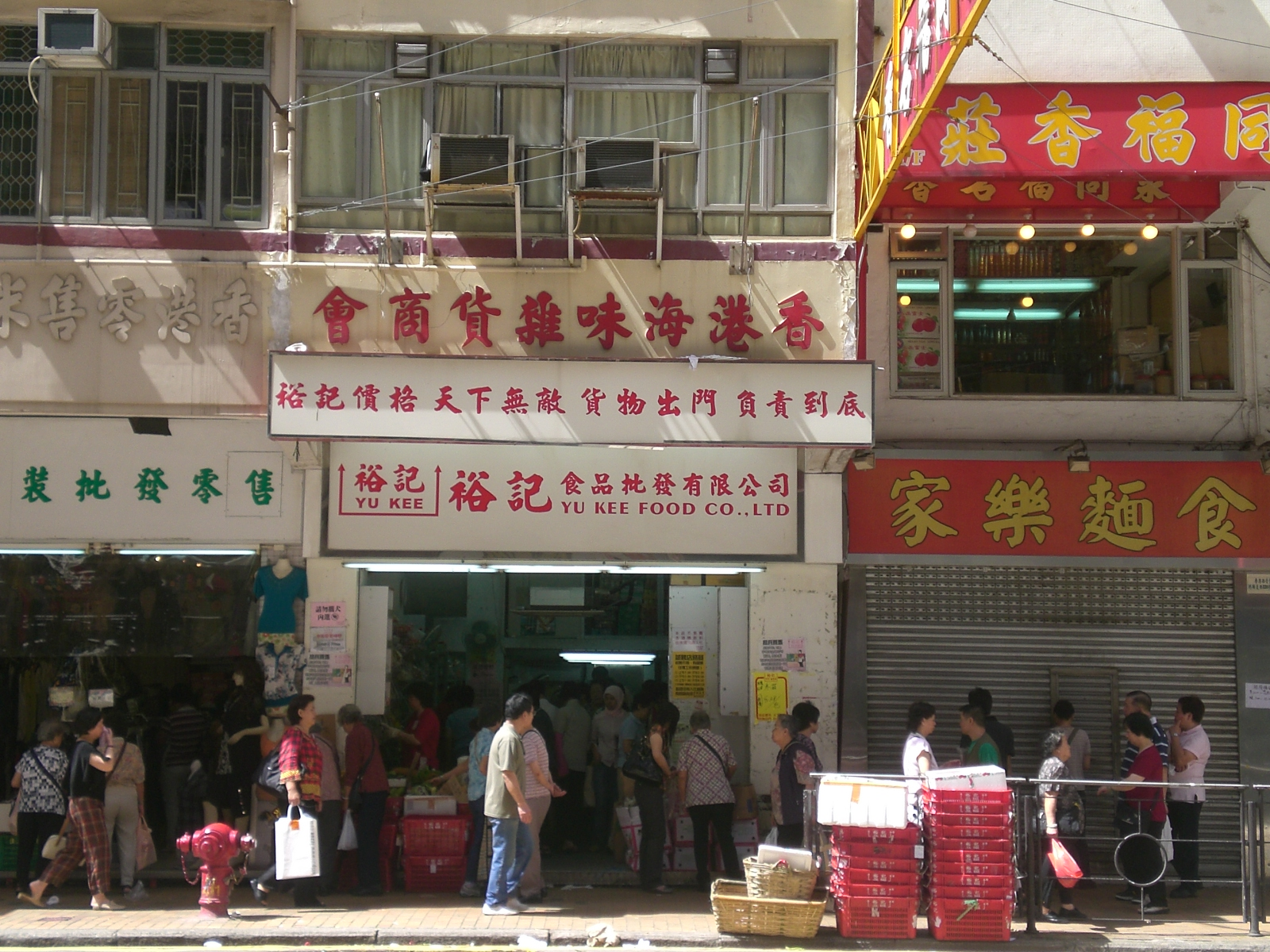
Yue Kee Store in Des Voeux Road West, Sai Wan, Hong Kong

Yu Kee Food Company Limited (Chinese: 裕記食品批發有限公司), or Yu Kee (Chinese: 裕記), was one of the food chain supermarkets in Hong Kong. It was established in 1990, initially as small family store. It had, at its peak time, around 70 stores all over Hong Kong. Its sold products include frozen food, fruits, dried food, canned food, vegetables and herbs, and they are sold at relatively lower prices than other supermarkets. However, because of financial difficulties, its business shrank. On 29 August 2011, it went into liquidation because of inability to settle its trade debt.
