= Cheap Lab =

Hong Kong retail chain

- Native name: 執笠倉
- Company type: Private
- Industry: Retail
- Founded: 2014
- Founder: So Hiu-fan
- Number of locations: 10 (2018)
- Area served: Hong Kong
- Website: www.cheaplab.hk

Cheap Lab (Chinese: 執笠倉) is a retail chain of stationery and household goods in Hong Kong, founded in 2014. The company operates ten stores in Hong Kong as of 2018.

== History ==
The company was founded in 2014 by So Hiu-fan. So opened the company's first location in a 40-square-foot space in the Apple Mall section of the Dragon Centre shopping mall in Sham Shui Po, which she leased for HK$3,000 per month, soon after she separated from her ex-husband. The store initially sold low-cost jewellery and a small amount of stationery purchased online from mainland China, with teenage schoolgirls being its main target audience. Later that year, So expanded the store by leasing ten shop spaces in the Apple Mall, giving a total area between 300 and 400 square feet, and rebranded the store "Cheap Lab" along with introducing its logo.

Cheap Lab opened its second location at Cheung Sha Wan Road in Sham Shui Po. As the company was able to attract a wider range of customers owing to the shop's location on a busy street, the company expanded the types of products it sold to include more types of stationery, household items and smartphone accessories. So met Law Ka-cheung, her current husband, in 2016; Law's parents founded stationery wholesaler Tung Fong Stationery Co. and operated the company for 30 years. Law joined Cheap Lab as a shareholder, injecting capital and introducing new sources for procuring products, such as by bypassing wholesalers and directly importing products from a Korean manufacturer. The company opened six new locations in 2016. As of 2018, the company operates ten locations in Hong Kong.

== Operations ==
Sit Wai-kit of Ming Pao attributed the rapid expansion of Cheap Lab to various strategies, including its Chinese name 執笠倉 which gives the impression of a constant clearance sale, and its strategy of importing products and leasing shops. Sit also noted that the company allowed retail staff to manage and interact with customers on the company's Facebook fan page based on their own creativity, including by taking videos of themselves promoting new products, with few restrictions. This stands in contrast with similar stationery retailers in Hong Kong which rarely use social media and instead focus on low pricing and quick inventory turnover. Sit pointed to several examples, including a Cheap Lab employee showcasing a low-cost fidget spinner by demonstrating in a video several ways with which it can be played; and another employee using a pair of 3M titanium scissors, instead of a knife, to cut a roast suckling pig.

As of 2019, customers spend an average of HK$20 per purchase at Cheap Lab. The company trialed the sale of higher-priced products in 2019, though So noted that customers were generally unwilling to purchase products priced above HK$50. Rent constitutes 20-30% of the company's costs, higher than most retailers. To reduce costs, the company usually selects shops with both a ground floor and an upper or basement floor, with a combined area larger than 1500 square feet to accommodate multiple types of products. The company said it had difficulty expanding into shopping malls despite its size because most mall operators were unwilling to accept branding the store "執笠", which literally means "going out of business".

In addition to founding Cheap Lab, So also founded online baby products retailer Little Monster in 2019, with an initial investment of HK$100,000. In explaining why she decided to start a new brand instead of selling baby products in Cheap Lab locations, she explained that as a mother herself, she felt that the environment inside Cheap Lab stores was not suitable for the sales of baby products. However, she "did not rule out" potential cooperation between the two brands, such as by setting up a corner in Cheap Lab stores selling baby products.
