= Tai Po Mega Mall =

Shopping centre in Tai Po, Hong Kong

Coordinates: 22°27′05″N 114°10′10″E

大埔超級城 Tai Po Mega Mall

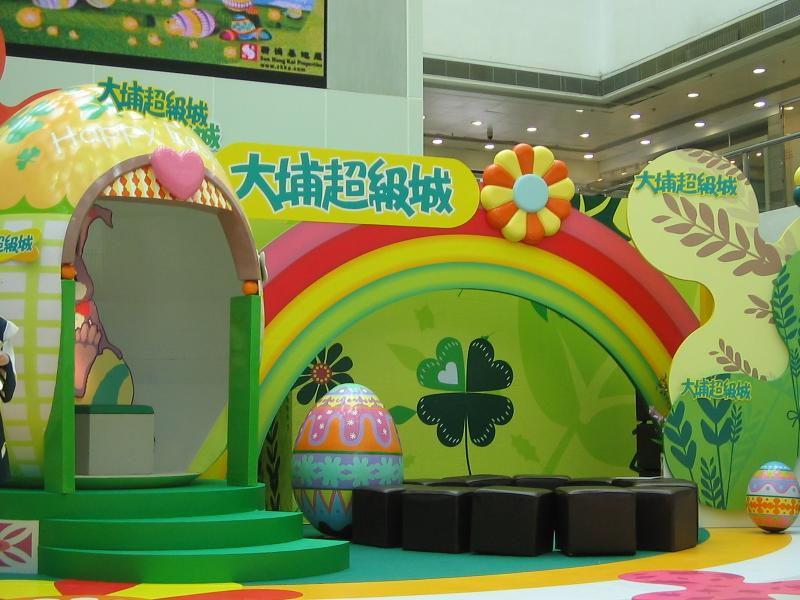
Zone C of Tai Po Mega Mall

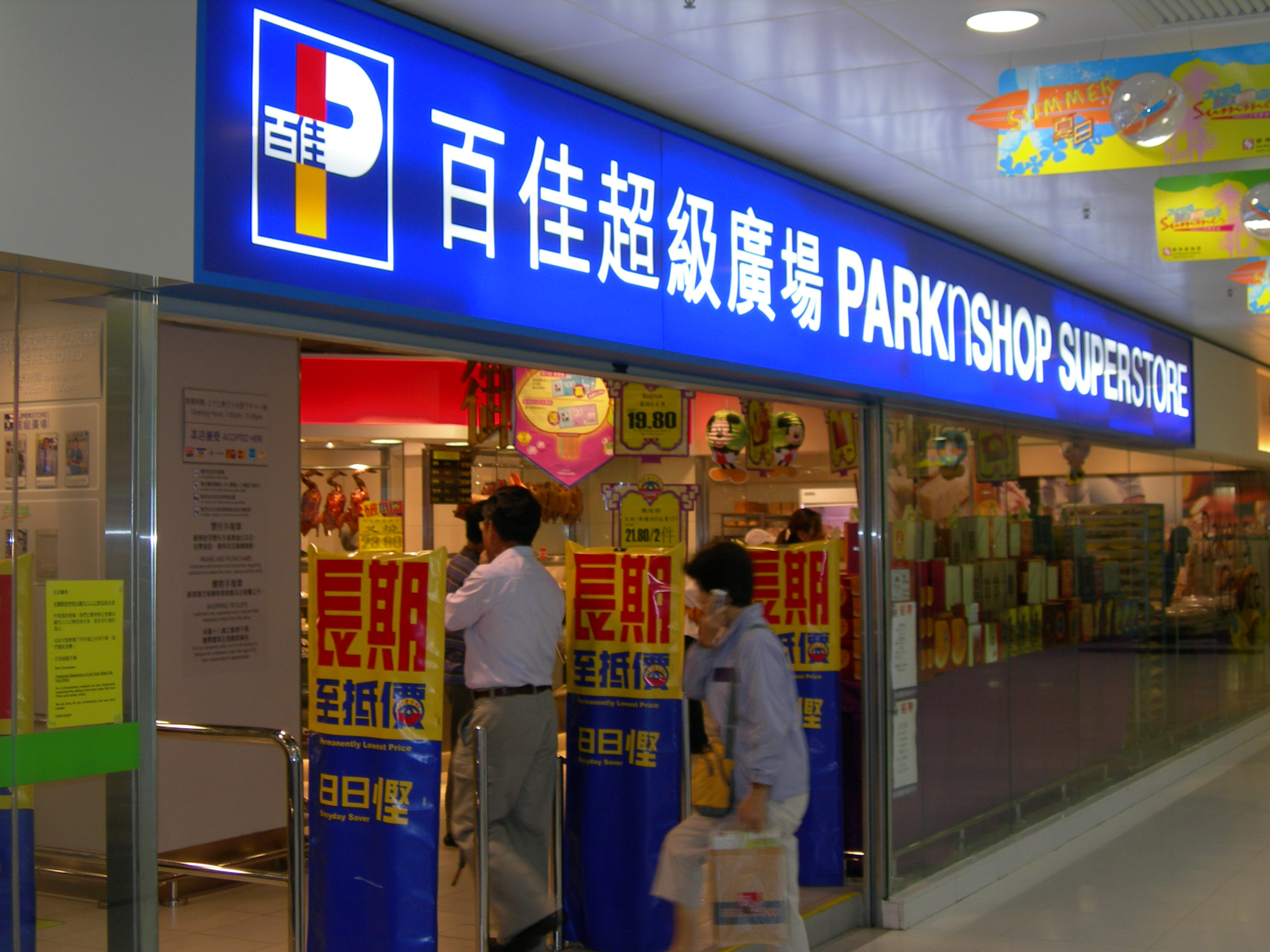
ParknShop Superstore in Tai Po Mega Mall

Tai Po Mega Mall (Chinese: 大埔超級城) is the largest shopping mall in Tai Po, New Territories, Hong Kong. It is owned by Sun Hung Kai Properties and located at On Pong Road, the centre of Tai Po New Town. Opened in 1985, it is made up of five different zones, with a total of 600,000 square feet (56,000 m^{2}) of retail space. The largest tenants in the Mall are YATA and ParknShop.
