= Tuen Mun Town Plaza =

Coordinates: 22°23′34″N 113°58′36″E

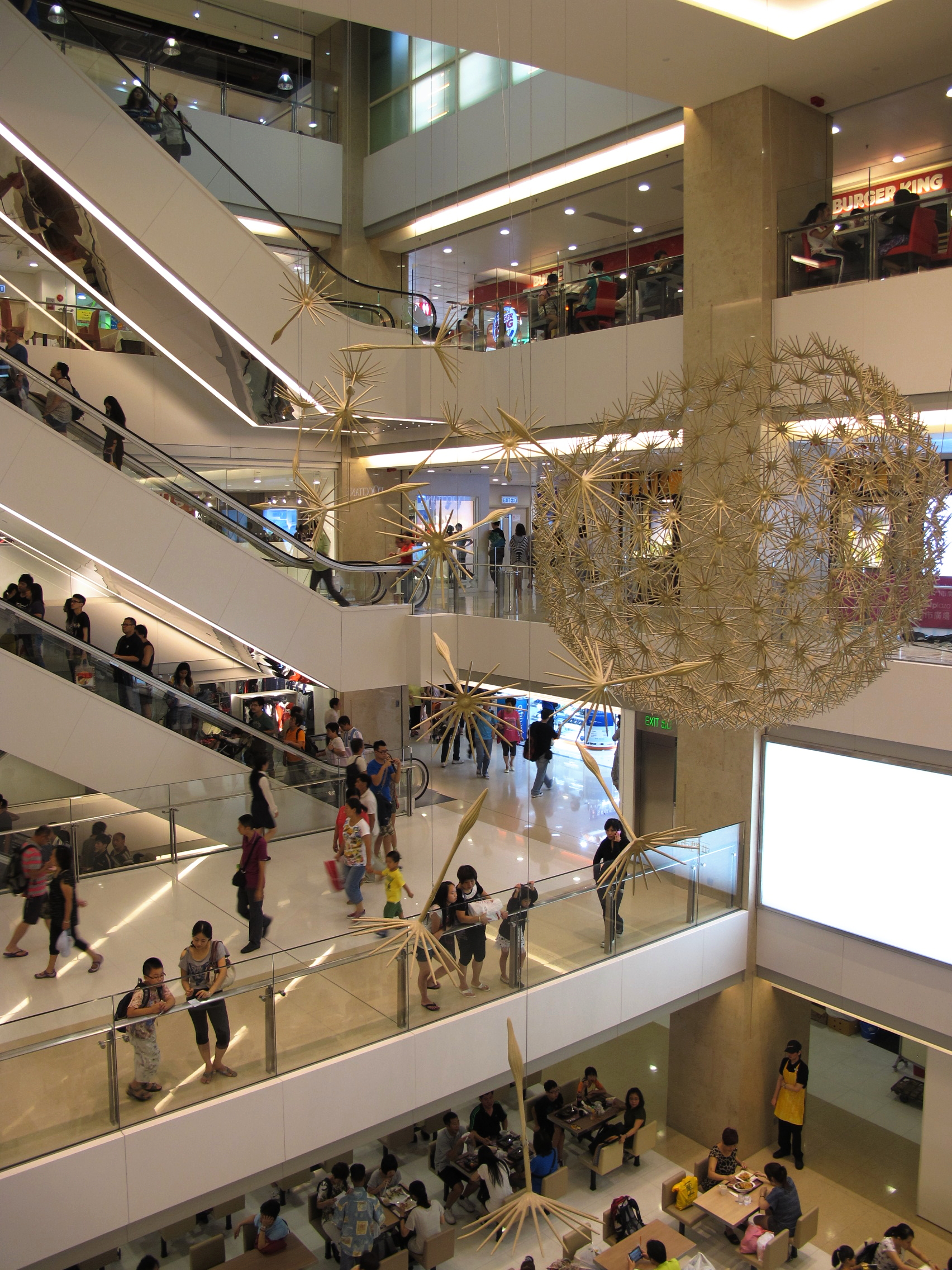
- Location: Tuen Mun, Hong Kong
- Opened: 1988; 38 years ago
- Website: www.tmtp.com.hk

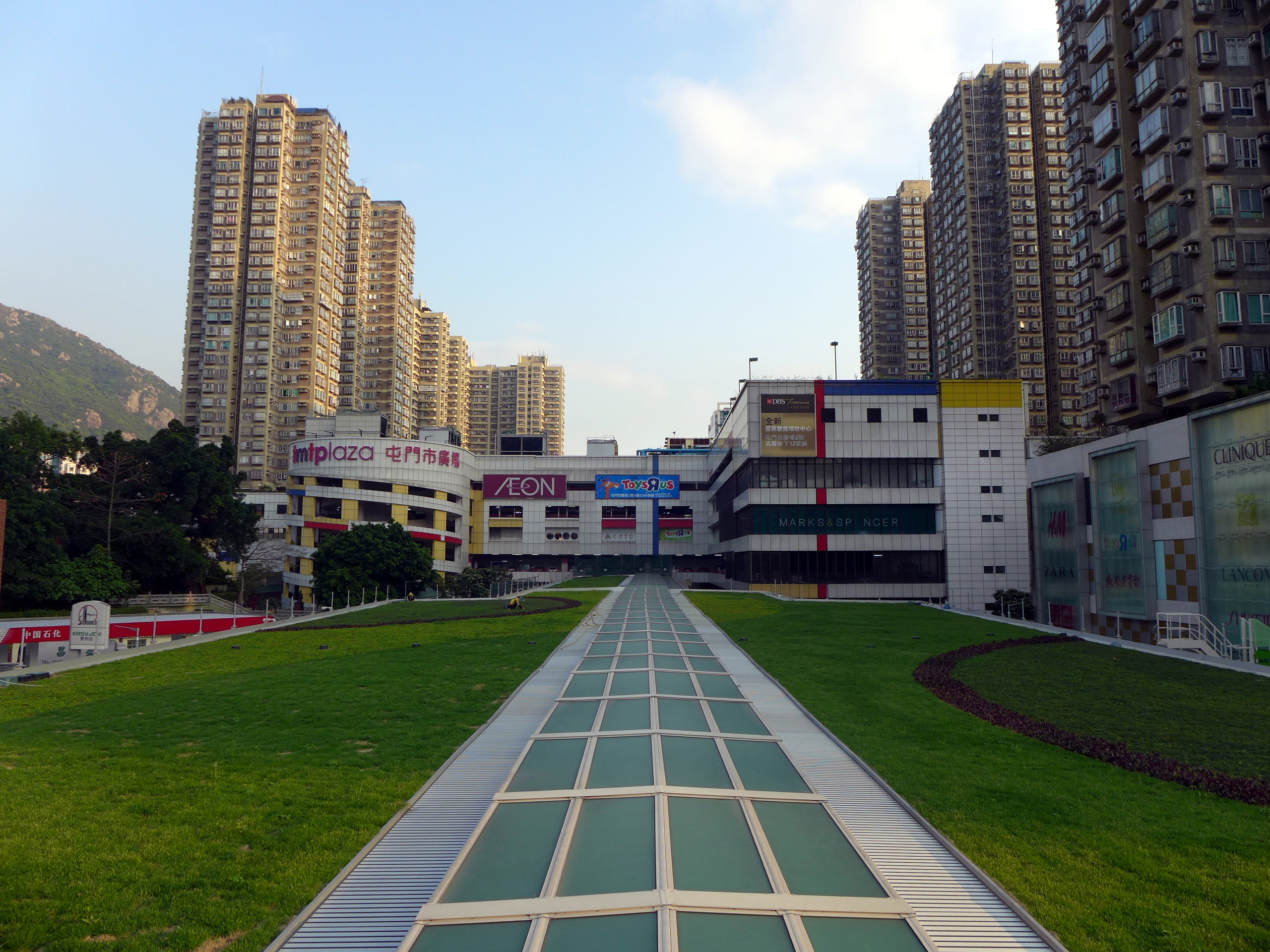
Tuen Mun Town Plaza Phase 1

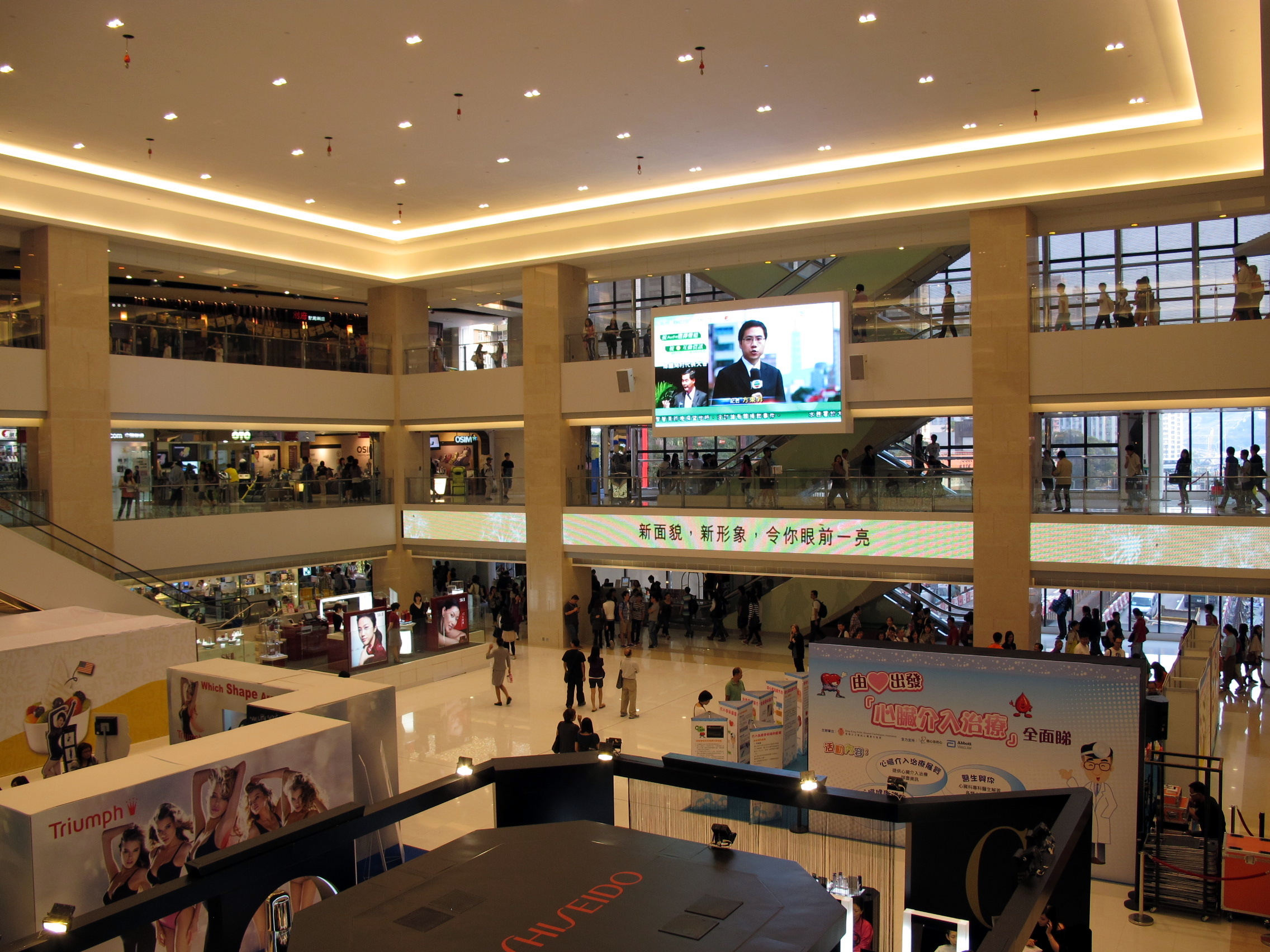
Tuen Mun Town Plaza in 2011

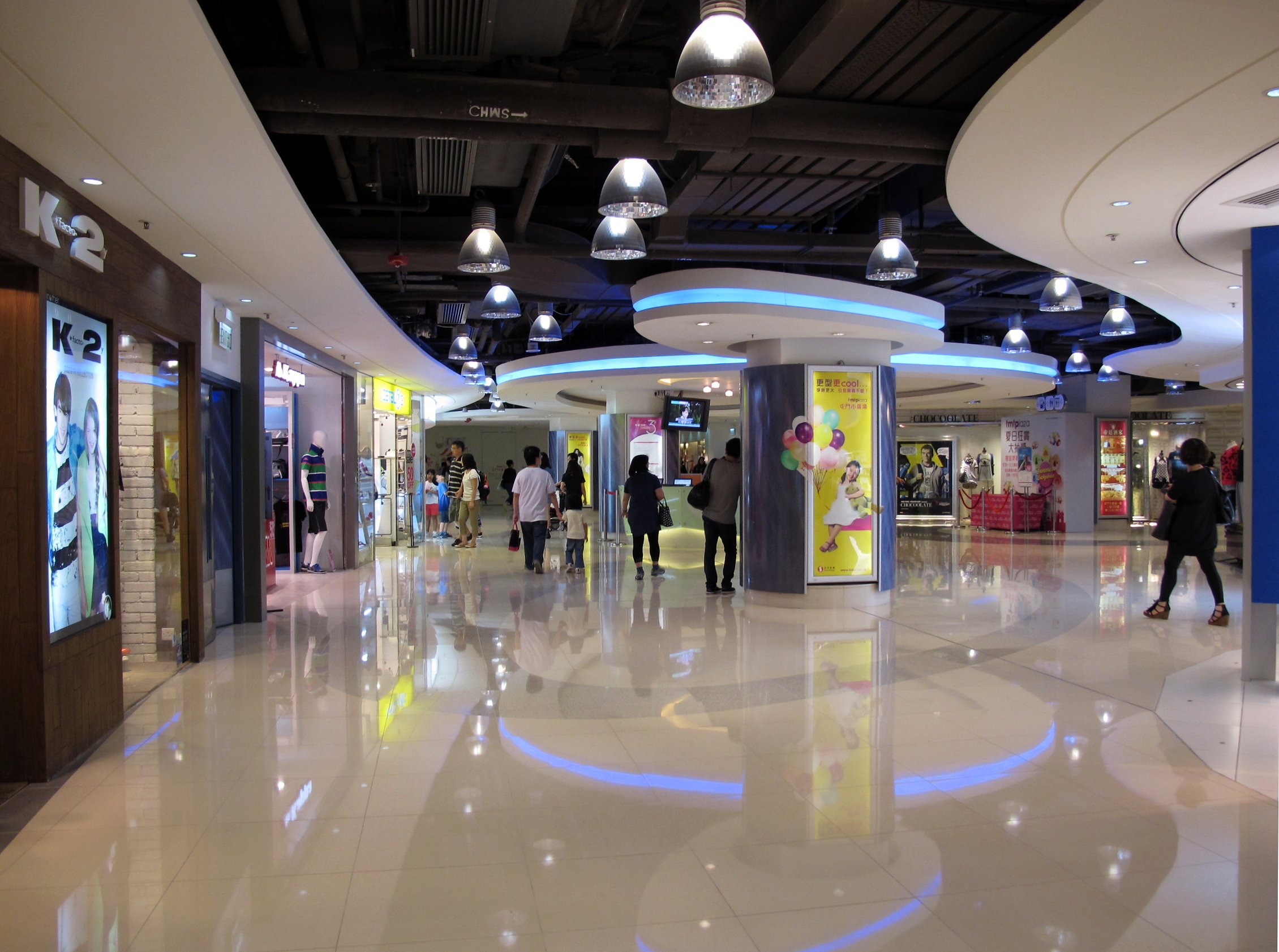
Level 3 shops

Tuen Mun Town Plaza (branded as tmtplaza; Chinese: 屯門市廣場) is the largest shopping mall in the NW New Territories of Hong Kong. Established in 1988 and located in the town of Tuen Mun, it was developed by the Sino Group. It provides a large range of merchandise, offering residents a myriad of shopping, dining and entertainment facilities.

Creative promotional programmes are often held to attract customers. A complete renovation and refurbishment has finished to provide more than 1,000,000 sq. ft. and over five storeys. It is at the hub of transport links and networks which include bus services to various parts of Hong Kong, including express services to Hong Kong Island and Kowloon, Tuen Ma line to Kowloon and the Light Rail serving the western New Territories. More than 300,000 customers come to the mall each day.

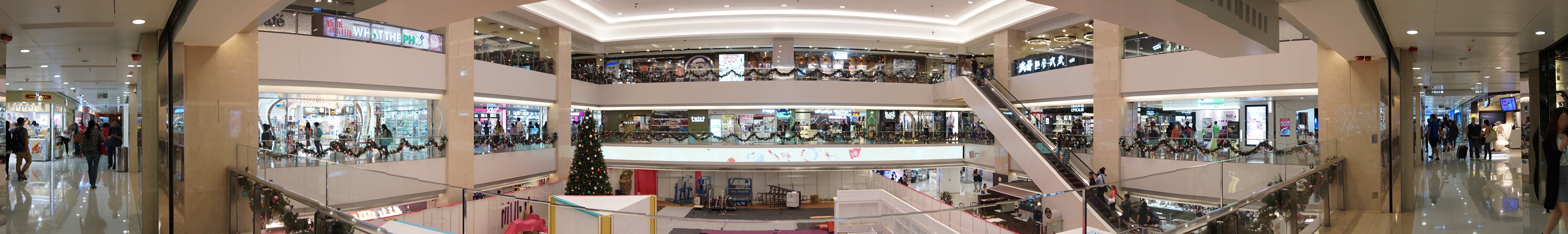
Main atrium

== Education ==
Tuen Mun Town Plaza is in Primary One Admission (POA) School Net 71. Within the school net are multiple aided schools (operated independently but funded with government money); no government schools are in the school net.

== Incidents ==
On January 15th, 2026, a 34-year-old man with a history of mental illnesses and associations stole a meat cleaver from the shopping center's Donki and roamed around the shopping mall before taking a woman hostage. The perpetrator was shot by the police and was pronounced dead at Tuen Mun Hospital shortly after. It is suspected that he was under the influence of drugs at the time of the crime.
