= Knutsford Terrace =

Street in Tsim Sha Tsui, Kowloon, Hong Kong

Coordinates: 22.30135°N 114.17475°E

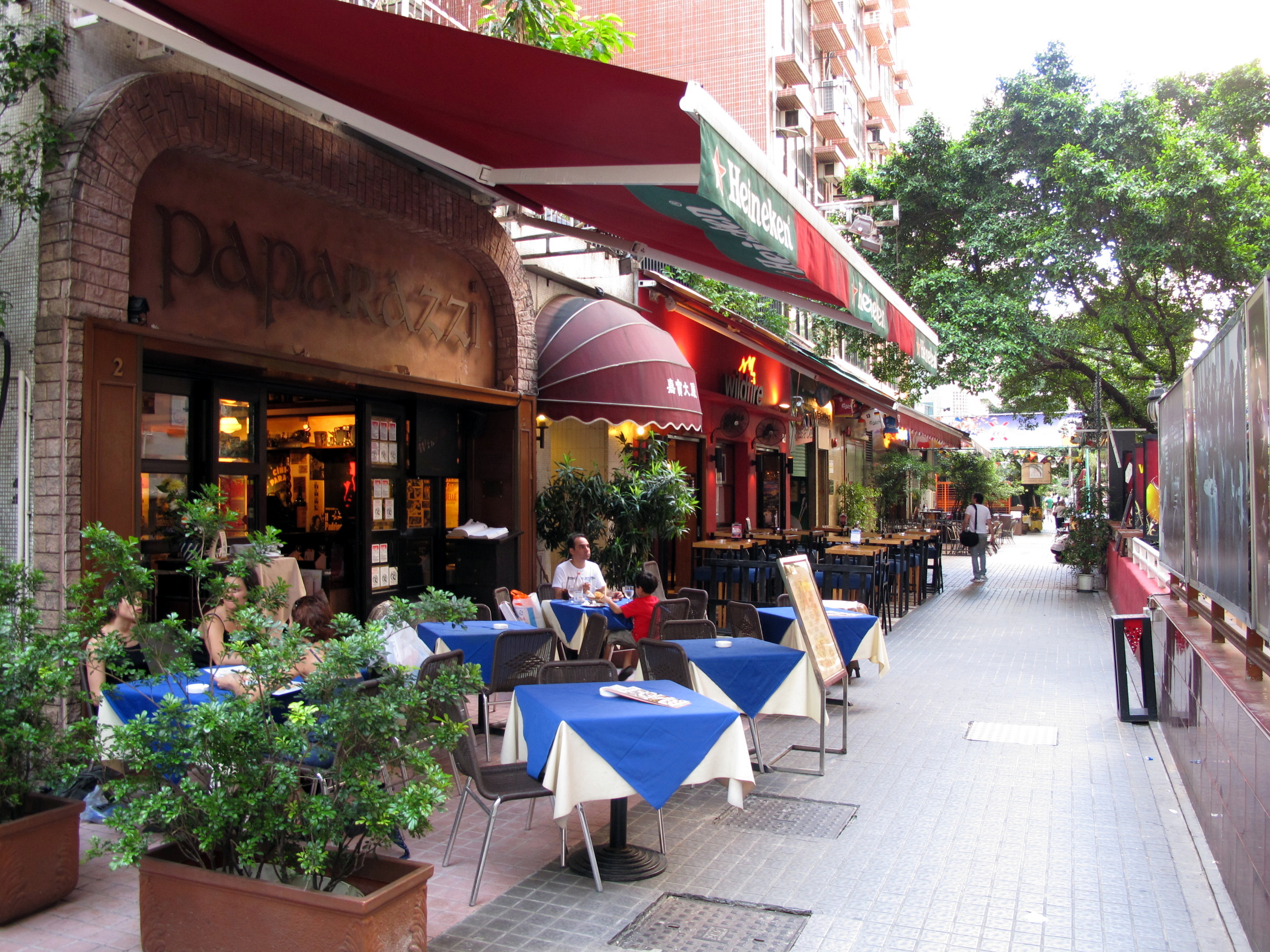
Daytime view of Knutsford Terrace in July 2010.

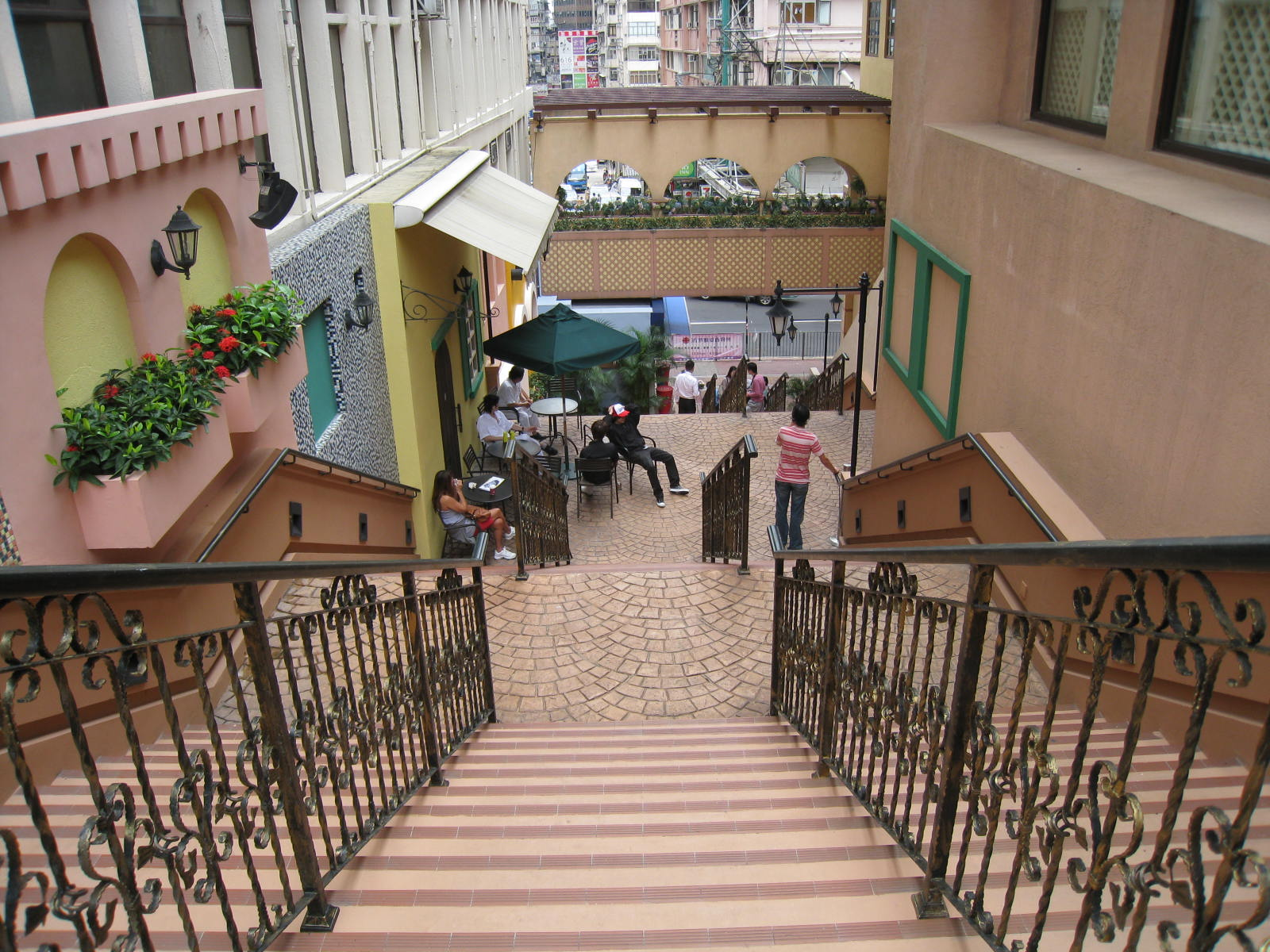
Steps leading from Knutsford Terrace down to Kimberley Road in November 2008.

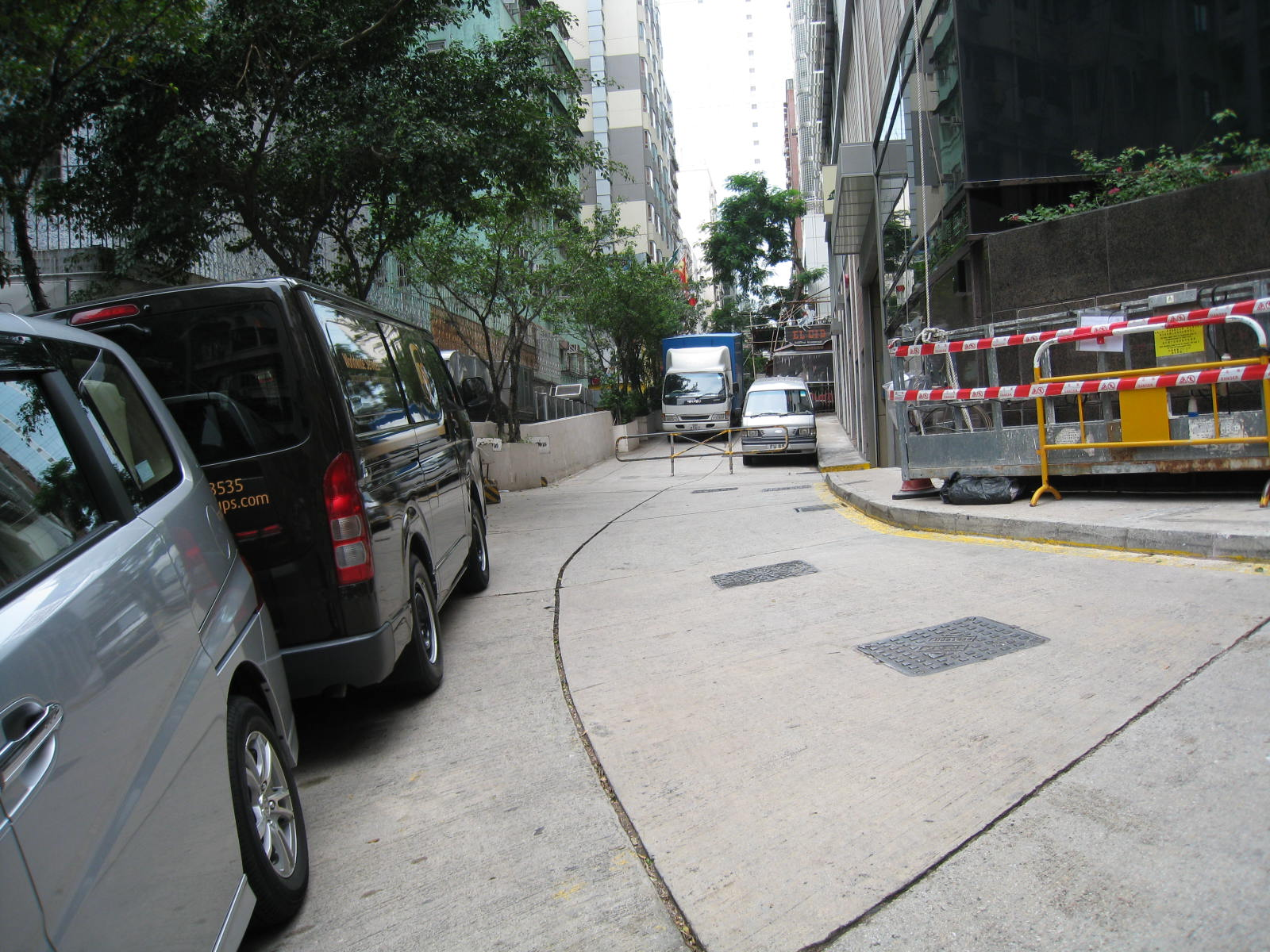
Observatory Road access to Knutsford Terrace in November 2008

Knutsford Terrace (Chinese: 諾士佛臺) is a terrace street in Tsim Sha Tsui, Kowloon in Hong Kong. It is famous for its bars, pubs and restaurants.

On the south slope of Observatory Hill, Knutsford Terrace is hidden behind the buildings of Kimberley Road. There is road access to the terrace near Mira Place and further road access from Observatory Road. The street is strictly for pedestrians. Instead of vehicles, it is full of tables and chairs for the restaurants.

== History ==
Before the construction of Knutsford Terrace, the slope consisted of gardens north of Kimberley Road. Starting from 1875, Kowloon Land and Building Company bought the land lots piece by piece and completed its purchases in 1888. The terrace was possibly built in 1895 with a row of sixteen small villas. It was then accessible from Observatory Road. Below the terrace were communal gardens with a tennis court on Kimberley Road. An access path was built to the terrace.

In 1923, the premises were sold and more houses were built on the garden along Kimberley Road. When the premises were sold house by house in the 1950s and 1960s, they were quickly replaced with multi-storey buildings.

In the mid to late 20th century, two middle schools chose to set up branches in Knutsford Terrace: Wellington College and Mansfield College. They no longer exist.

== Restaurants ==
Restaurants on the street offer a variety of national dishes, such as Italian, French, American, Spanish, Chinese, Japanese, Turkish, and Russian.

== See also ==
- List of streets and roads in Hong Kong
- Lan Kwai Fong
- SoHo, Hong Kong
