= Observatory Road =

Road in Hong Kong

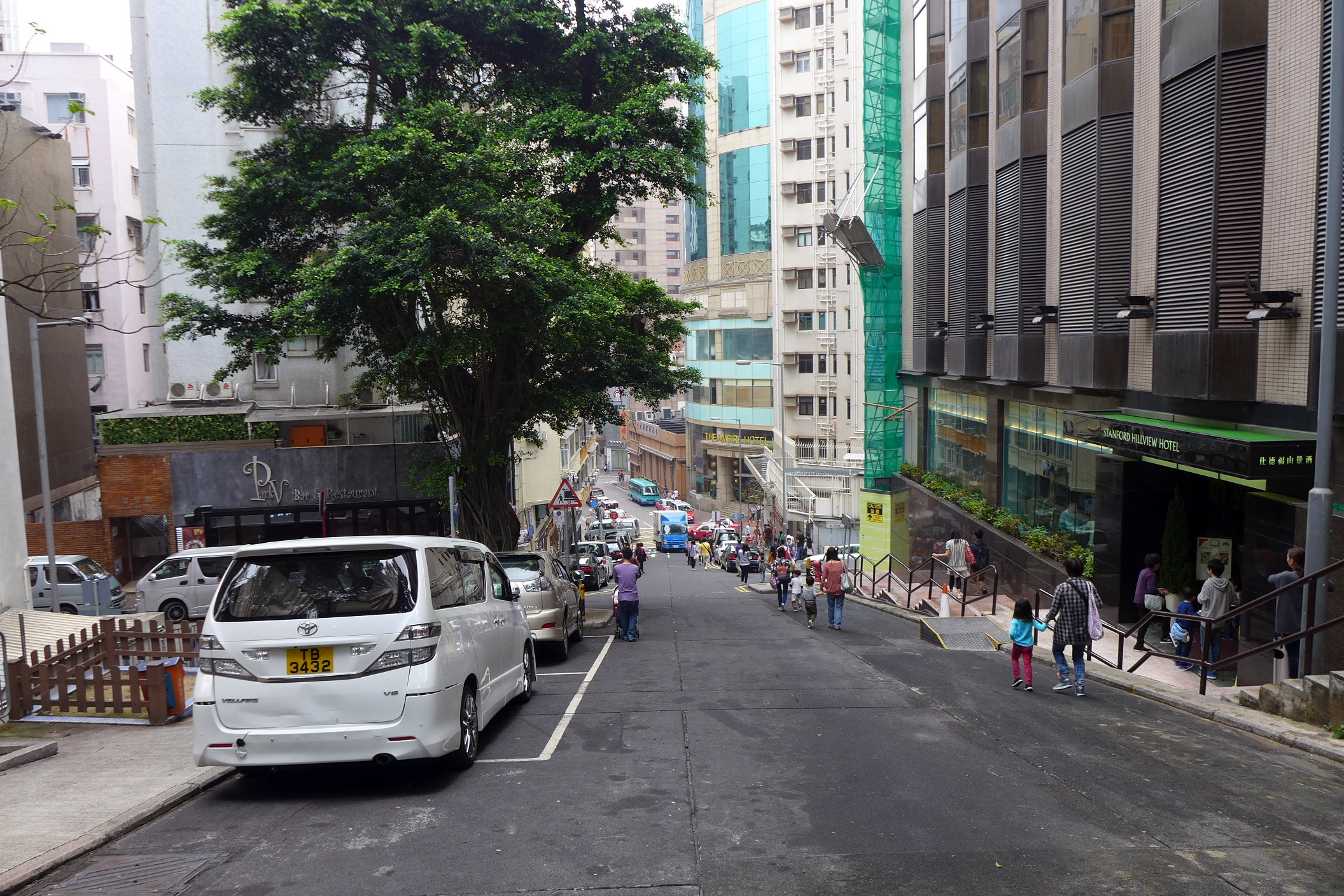
- Observatory Road
- Native name: 天文臺道 (Yue Chinese)
- Length: 480 m (1,570 ft); 220 m (720 ft) accessible to public
- Location: Observatory Hill, Hong Kong
- Coordinates: 22°18′05″N 114°10′29″E
- East end: Chatham Road
- West end: Nathan Road

Construction
- Completion: 1883; 142 years ago

Observatory Road
- Chinese: 天文臺道
Transcriptions
Yue: Cantonese
- Yale Romanization: tīn màhn tòih dou
- Jyutping: tin1 man4 toi4 dou3
- IPA: [tʰíːn mɐ̏n tʰɔ̏ːi tōu]

Observatory Road (Chinese: 天文臺道) is one of the oldest roads in Hong Kong, and has existed since 1883. It is called so because this is where the Hong Kong Observatory was constructed. The Observatory is still in operation and provides updated typhoon information and other services for the Northwest Pacific area.

== Description ==
Observatory Road is located in the Tsim Sha Tsui area of the Kowloon Peninsula and is about 200 metres in length. Despite its relatively short length, however, it is a significant historical area especially since some buildings from the old era still stand alongside the newer imposing structures of modern Kowloon. The road runs uphills and downhills on the Observatory Hill.

Observatory Road connects to Chatham Road South at one end and Nathan Road at the other. The part of the Road crossing the Hong Kong Observatory compound is not open to the public. Among the other familiar places around this area are the Hong Kong Museum of History, the Science Museum, Energy Plaza with its Clock Fountain, Mira Place, Ramada Hotel, and of course, the Hong Kong Observatory itself.

== Intersections ==
The entire route is in Observatory Hill, Yau Tsim Mong District.

km	mi	Destinations	Notes
0.00	0.00	Chatham Road South	
0.08	0.050	Kimberley Street	
0.12	0.075	Kimberley Road	
0.17	0.11	Knutsford Terrace	
0.19	0.12	Observatory Court	
0.20	0.12	Gate	Private access
0.48	0.30	Nathan Road	Private access
1.000 mi = 1.609 km; 1.000 km = 0.621 mi: Closed/former

== See also ==
- List of streets and roads in Hong Kong
