= Tsim Sha Tsui =

Urban area in Kowloon, Hong Kong

Tsim Sha Tsui 尖沙咀 (Note: On all government documents and road signs, it is referred to as "尖沙咀". However, the last character (咀, mouth) is sometimes written alternatively as "嘴", since "嘴" is more commonly used than "咀" in other contexts.)
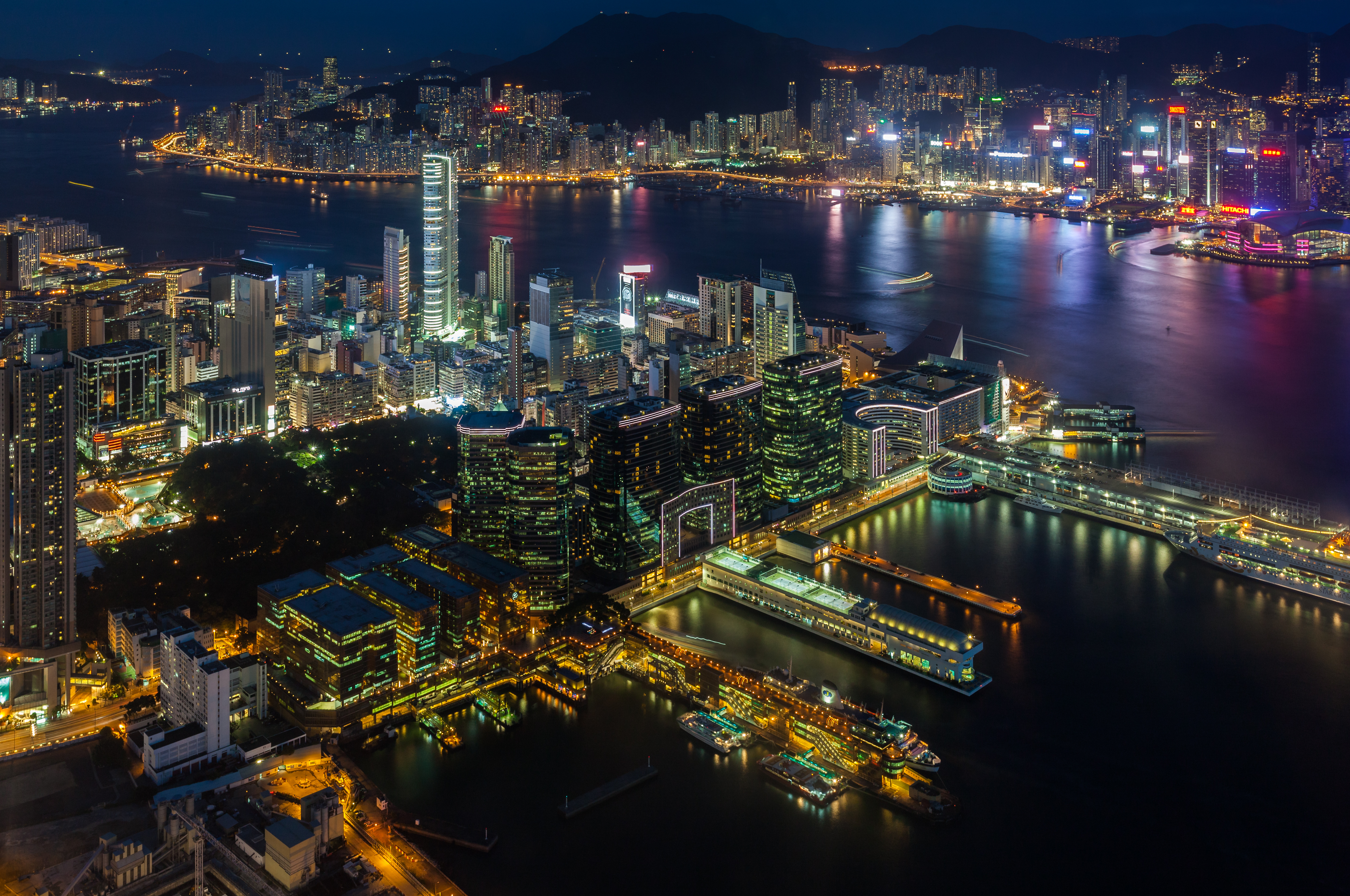
- Tsim Sha Tsui waterfront, Victoria Harbour from Sky100, 2013
- Interactive map of Tsim Sha Tsui
- Coordinates: 22°17′38″N 114°10′16″E
- Country: Hong Kong
- Area: Kowloon
- District: Yau Tsim Mong

Tsim Sha Tsui
- Traditional Chinese: 尖沙咀
- Simplified Chinese: 尖沙咀
- Cantonese Yale: Jīmsājéui
Transcriptions
Standard Mandarin
- Hanyu Pinyin: Jiānshāzuǐ
- Bopomofo: ㄐㄧㄢ ㄕㄚ ㄗㄨㄟˇ
Yue: Cantonese
- Yale Romanization: Jīmsājéui
- Jyutping: Zim1saa1zeoi2
- IPA: Cantonese pronunciation: [tsíːm.sáː.tsɵ̌y]

Heung Po Tau
- Traditional Chinese: 香埗頭
- Simplified Chinese: 香埗头
- Cantonese Yale: Hēungbouhtàuh
- Literal meaning: Port for exporting incense tree
Transcriptions
Standard Mandarin
- Hanyu Pinyin: Xiāngbùtóu
- Bopomofo: ㄒㄧㄤ ㄅㄨˋ ㄊㄡˊ
Yue: Cantonese
- Yale Romanization: Hēungbouhtàuh
- Jyutping: Hoeng1bou6tau4
- IPA: Cantonese pronunciation: [hœ́ːŋ.pòu.tʰɐ̭u]

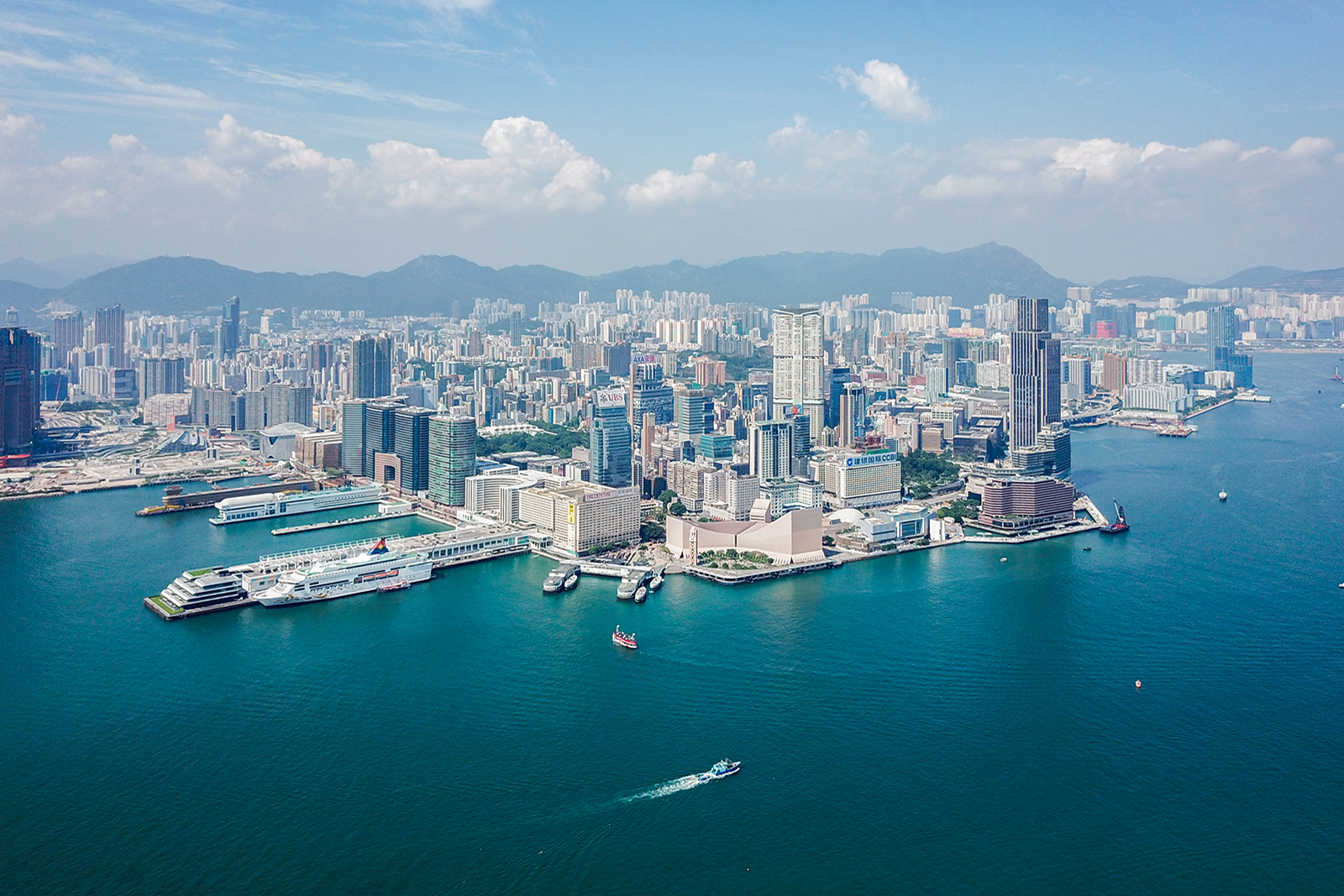
Tsim Sha Tsui, as seen from Hong Kong Island, 2018

Tsim Sha Tsui (Chinese: 尖沙咀), often abbreviated as TST, is an area in southern Kowloon, Hong Kong. The area is administratively part of the Yau Tsim Mong District. Tsim Sha Tsui East is a piece of land reclaimed from the Hung Hom Bay now east of Tsim Sha Tsui. The area is bounded north by Austin Road and in the east by Hong Chong Road and Cheong Wan Road.

Geographically, Tsim Sha Tsui is a cape on the tip of the Kowloon Peninsula pointing towards Victoria Harbour, opposite Central. Several villages had been established in this location before Kowloon was ceded to the British Empire in 1860. The name Tsim Sha Tsui in Cantonese means sharp sandspit. It was also known as Heung Po Tau (香埗頭), i.e. a port for exporting incense tree.

Tsim Sha Tsui is a major tourist hub in Hong Kong, with many high-end shops, bars, pubs and restaurants that cater to tourists. Many of Hong Kong's museums are located in the area.

== Geography ==
Before any land reclamation, Tsim Sha Tsui consisted of two parallel capes with a bay in between in the south. The west cape, Kowloon Point, the proper Tsim Sha Tsui, coincided with the small hill where the Former Marine Police Headquarters is sited, while the east cape was the hill that is today known as Blackhead Point. The bay between the capes extended as far north as the present-day Mody Road. Today, Canton Road marks the western edge of Tsim Sha Tsui, and Chatham Road the eastern edge. The area is hilly, although many hills were levelled for reclamation.

== History ==
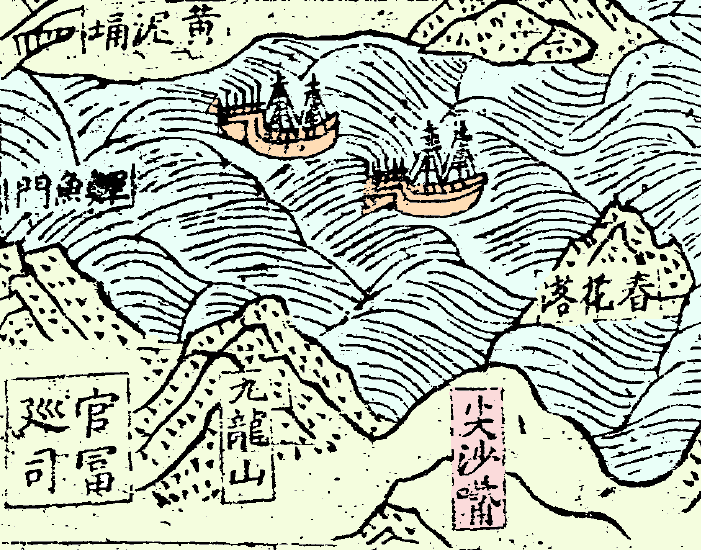
The position of Tsim Sha Tsui (pink) during Ming dynasty

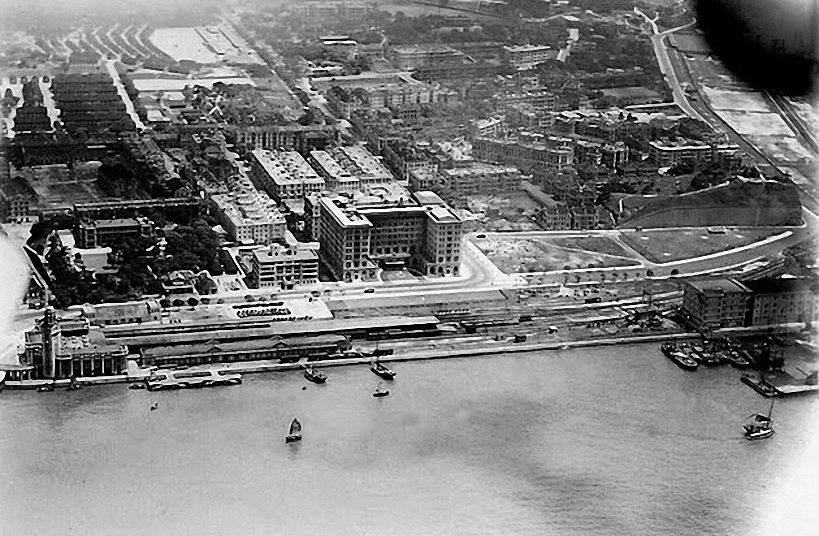
Aerial view of Tsim Sha Tsui in early 20th century, showing Kowloon station (low left corner), the former Marine Police Headquarters (on the hill inland behind the station), and the Peninsula Hotel (centre)

Historical maps in Ming or Qing dynasty named the channel between Tsim Sha Tsui and Central as Chung Mun (Chinese: 中門; Jyutping: zung1mun4; lit. 'the middle gate') as it is located in the middle of the two other channels, Kap Shui Mun in the west and Lei Yue Mun in the east, in the harbour.

Before Kowloon was ceded to Britain in 1860, many villages were present in the area. Incense trees (Aquilaria sinensis) from the New Territories were gathered at some quays in Tsim Sha Tsui and transferred to Shek Pai Wan in southern Hong Kong Island to be exported to the rest of the world. It was thus known as Heung Po Tau, the fragrant quay. Shortly after the land was ceded to Britain, construction began on the first section of Tsim Sha Tsui's major thoroughfare, Nathan Road.

In 1888, the Star Ferry started offering regular transport between Central and Tsim Sha Tsui, and the area has flourished ever since. Until the 20th century, Tsim Sha Tsui was a leafy suburb that contained numerous facilities of the British garrison in Hong Kong. Whitfield Barracks, converted into Kowloon Park in 1970, ran to the west of Nathan Road, and Kowloon Naval Yard occupied the waterfront to the west of the army encampment. In the early 20th century, Chinese people were allowed to live in the area to attract more people to trade in the colony. Garden houses were replaced with crowded residential blocks. Wharves and godowns were built along the west shore. Major developers like Hormusjee Naorojee Mody and Catchick Paul Chater actively participated in the development of Tsim Sha Tsui.

The Kowloon–Canton Railway (British Section) commenced service on 1 October 1910. Kowloon station in Tsim Sha Tsui was approved to be constructed on reclaimed land in 1912. It was built on the new southern reclamation from 1913 to 1915. The rails extended along the western reclamation parallel to Chatham Road, with old Hung Hom station near the Gun Club Hill Barracks at the junction of Chatham Road and Austin Road. Another major road, Salisbury Road, was completed in approximately the same period. The landmark Peninsula Hotel was built on the reclamation in 1928, opposite to the station.

The Kowloon station was relocated to a new Hung Hom station in 1978. The station was demolished except for its landmark Clock Tower. The Hong Kong Space Museum and, later, the Hong Kong Cultural Centre, were erected on the site. The rail tracks were replaced by the New World Centre and other gardens in Tsim Sha Tsui East.

In 1999, a nightclub hostess was tortured in an apartment by three men and a 14-year-old girl. The victim was decapitated and other body parts were cut from her torso with a hacksaw. Her skull was later put into a Hello Kitty mermaid plush toy. It is known as the Hello Kitty murder case.

In 2016, a Tsim Sha Tsui Waterfront Revitalisation Plan was shelved due to public controversy.

== Industry ==
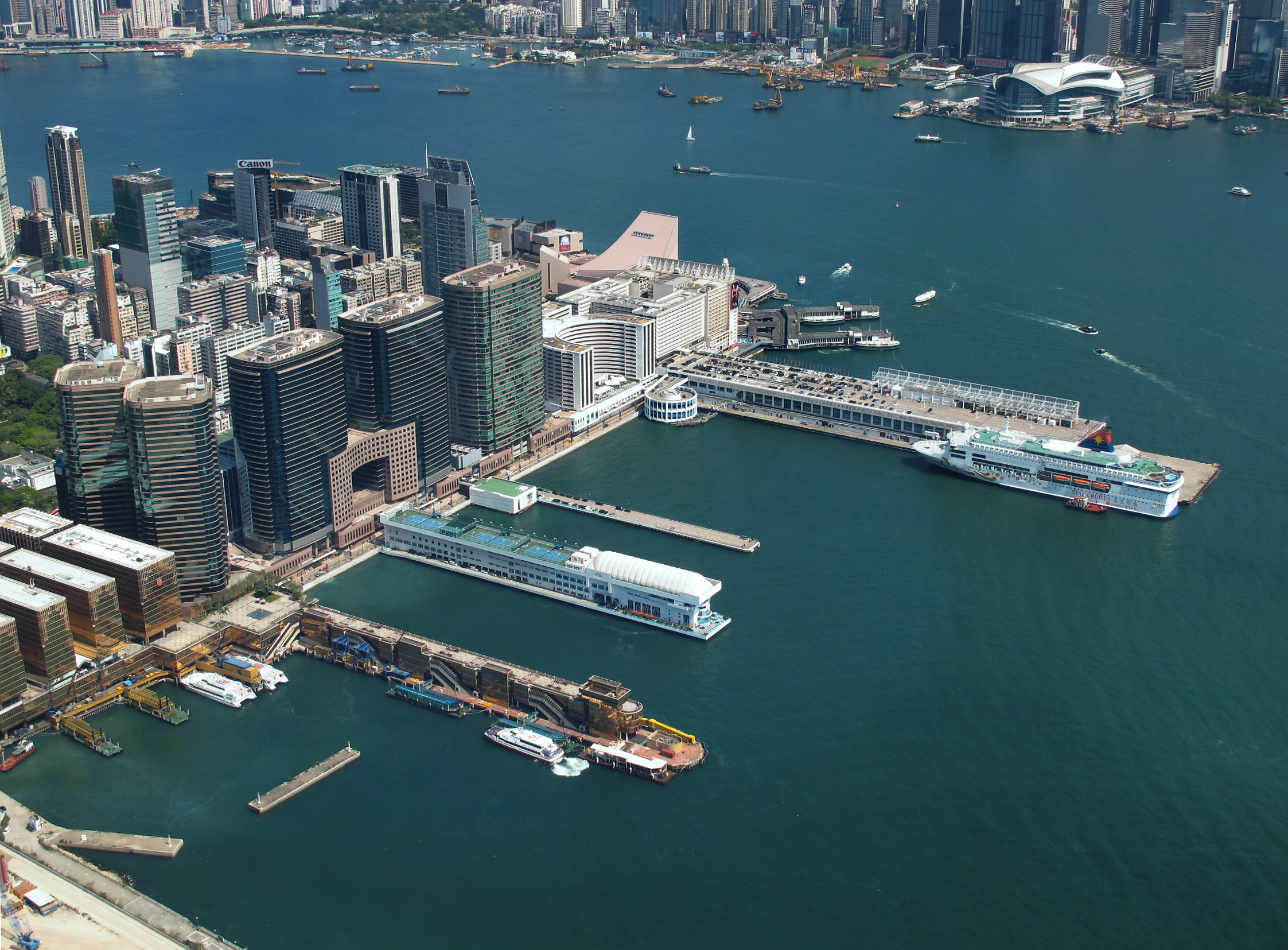
The southern tip of Tsim Sha Tsui, with the Hong Kong China Ferry Terminal and Harbour City, 2011.

Tsim Sha Tsui has been a hub of the tertiary sector from colonial days to the present. In the early colonial days, transport, tourism and trading were main business in the area. As port and rail facilities moved out of the area, the major industry falls on the later two. Tsim Sha Tsui, like Central, contains several centres of finance. After Kai Tak Airport closed, the height restriction on buildings was removed and taller skyscrapers, parallel to those of Central, have been constructed.

== Recreation and tourist attractions ==
=== Hotels ===
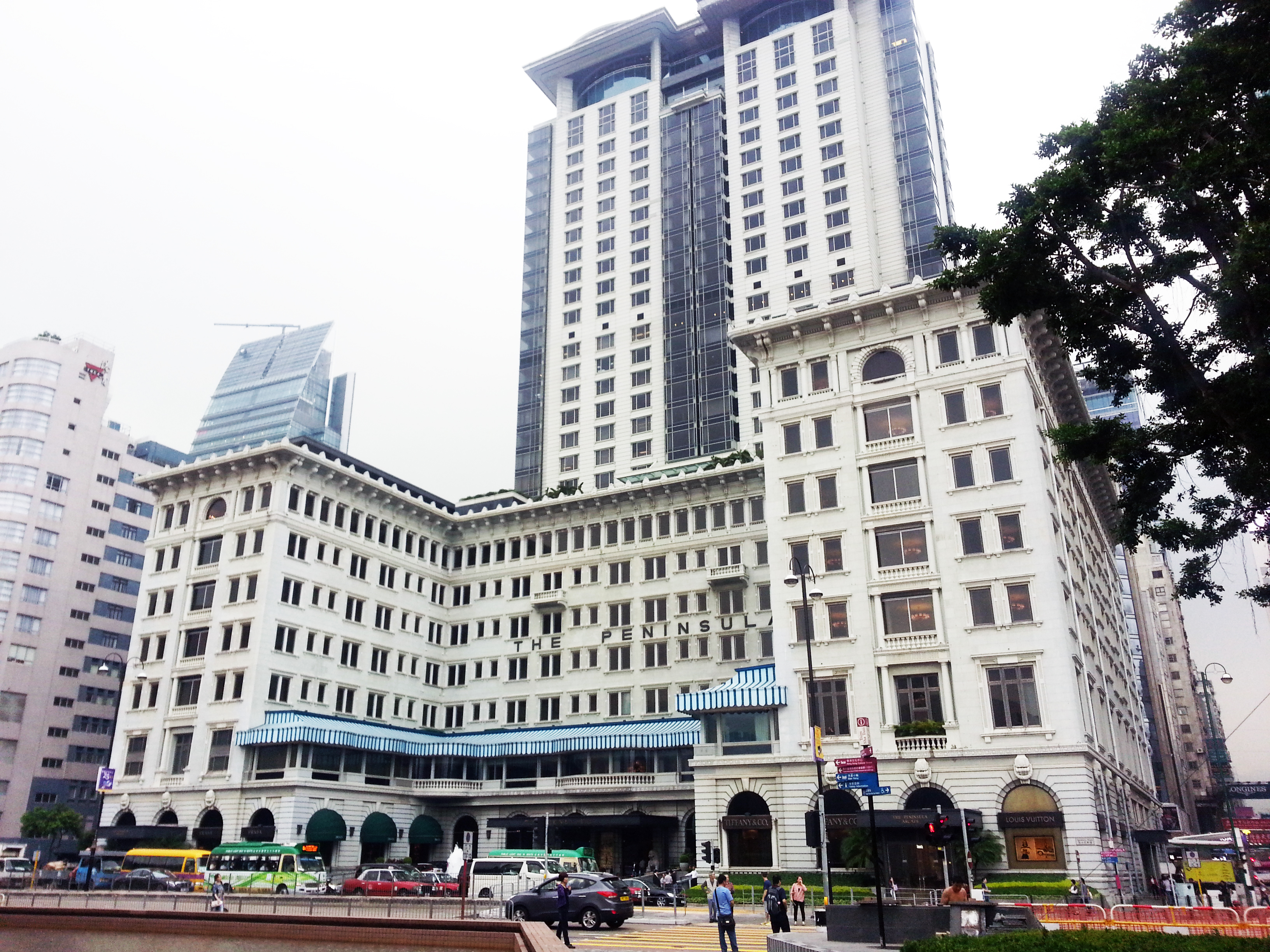
The Peninsula Hong Kong and its office towers, 2014

Tourism and hospitality are major industries in Tsim Sha Tsui. The area has the highest concentration of hotels in Hong Kong. The hotels include The Peninsula, Rosewood Hong Kong, Kowloon Shangri-La, The Regent Hong Kong, The Mira Hong Kong, Baden-Powell International House, Hotel Icon, and the Hotel Panorama. The Hyatt Regency Hong Kong was closed on 1 January 2006 and the iSQUARE shopping mall was built at its former location; it re-opened in October 2009 on Hanoi Road of Tsim Sha Tsui within the new The Masterpiece skyscraper. Other hotels in virtually every price range and level of luxury can be found throughout the area; Chungking Mansions is known for providing cheap lodging for backpackers.

=== Restaurants ===
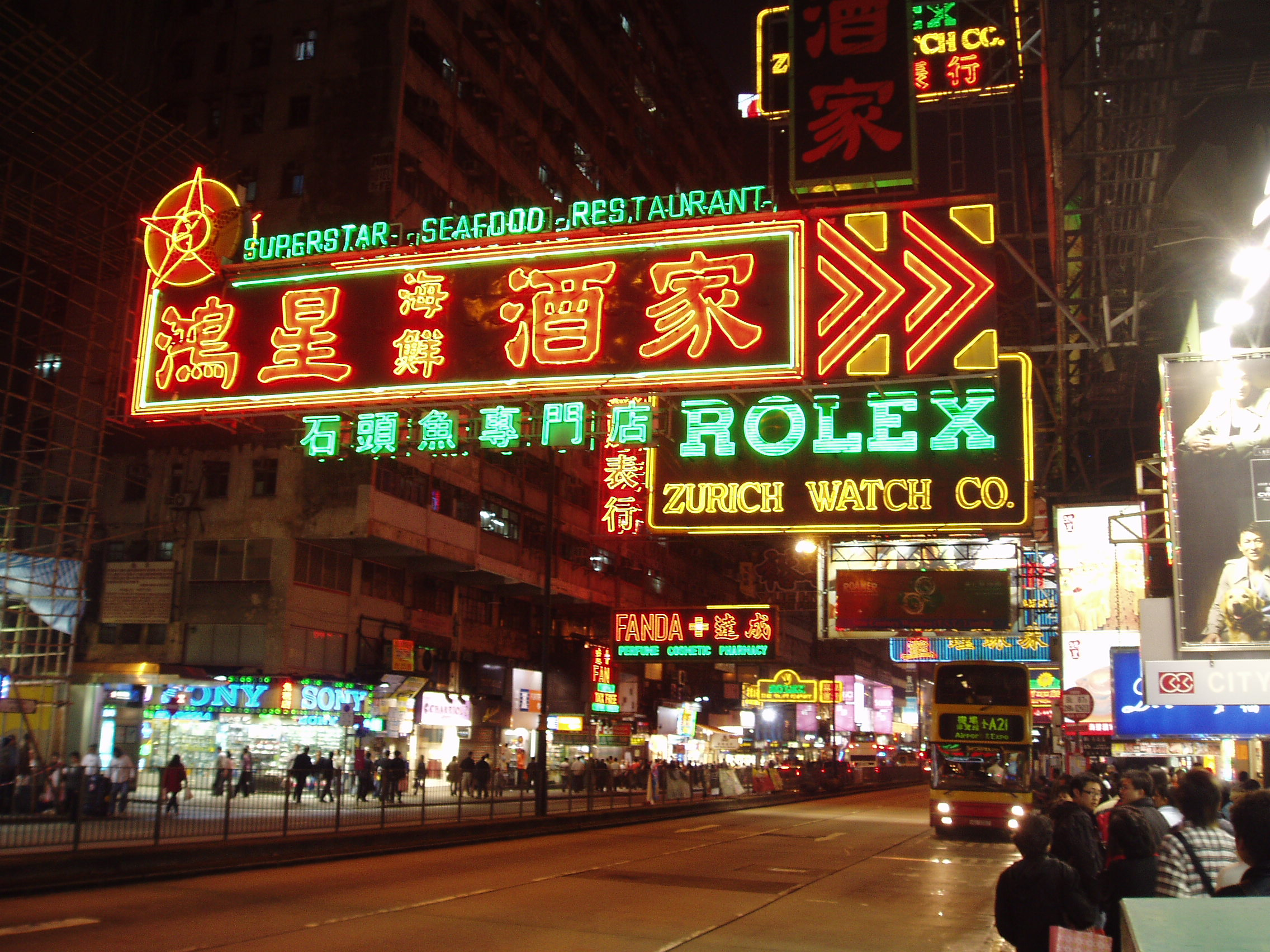
Neon signs in Nathan Road, Tsim Sha Tsui, 2006

Tsim Sha Tsui is one of many places to find exotic restaurants in Hong Kong. Hillwood Road at the north of Observatory Hill concentrates on restaurants of different national dishes. Knutsford Terrace on the other side of the hill is a terrace of pubs. Kimberley Street is famous for the Korean cuisine restaurants and grocery stores, especially after the advent of Korean Wave (韓流) in Hong Kong, giving the street the nickname of Koreatown (小韓國). From there, a string of Korean restaurants are located on Austin Avenue which circles Observatory Hill. Located on Nathan Road, the Chungking Mansions is a major tourist attraction in Tsim Sha Tsui. Georgetown Parade is well known for its dog nose biscuits. These recognisable buildings were featured in the film Chungking Express, and are full of inexpensive guest houses, Indian restaurants, and money changers.

=== Shopping ===
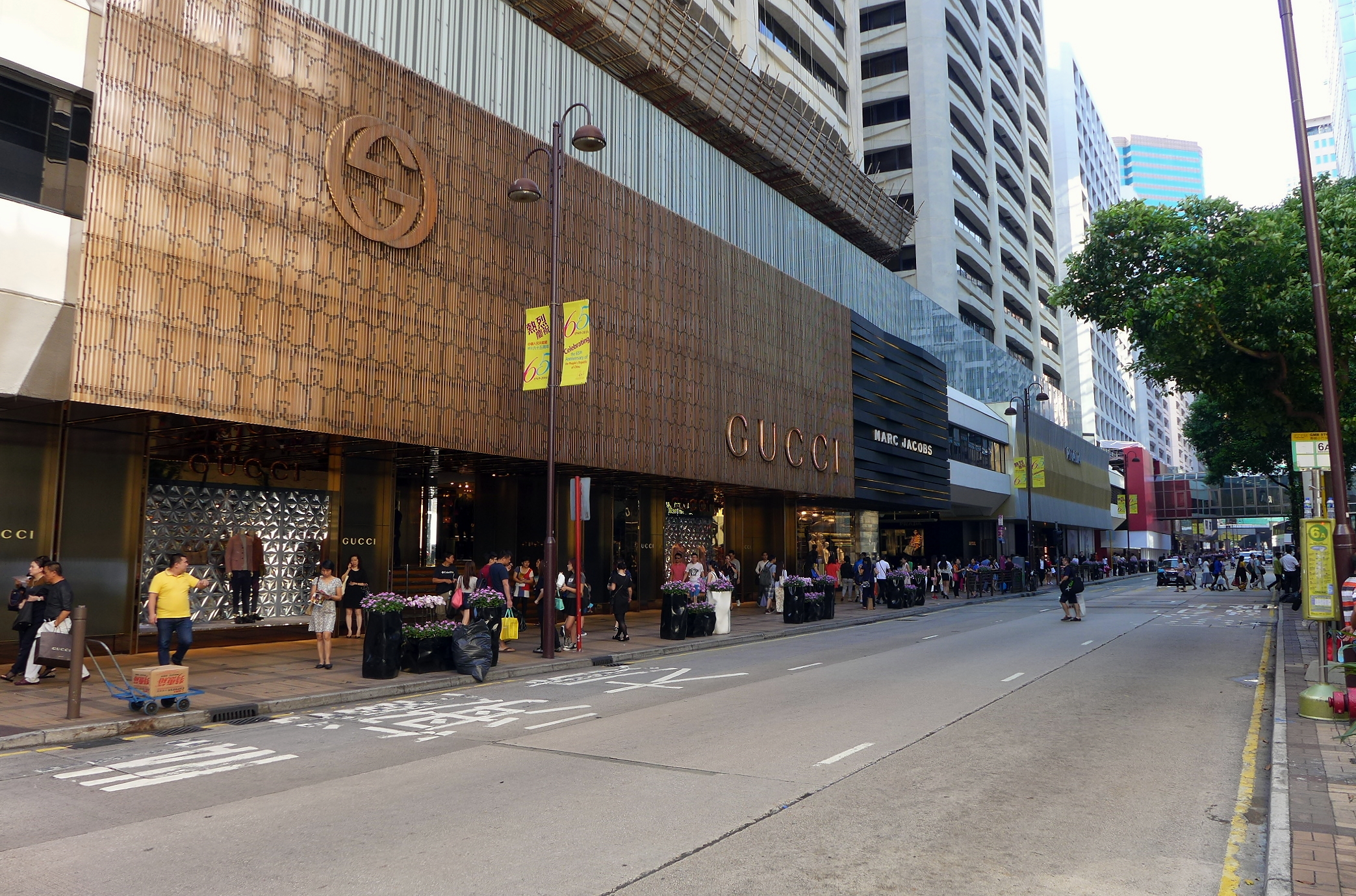
Gucci store in the Tsim Sha Tsui section of Canton Road, 2014

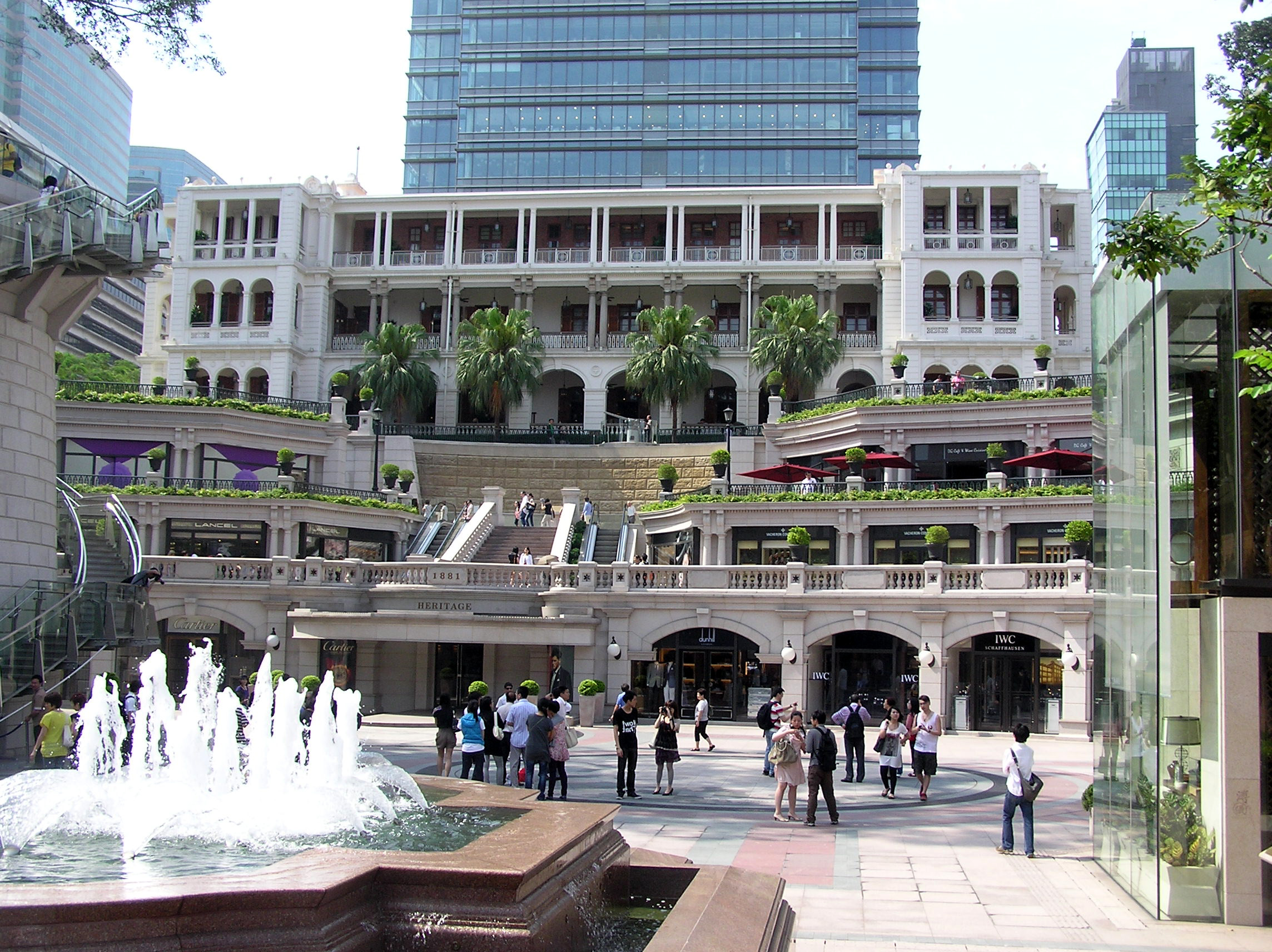
1881 Heritage building

Tsim Sha Tsui is one of the main shopping areas in Hong Kong. Shopping malls in the area include:

- 1881 Heritage, located within the renovated Former Marine Police Headquarters
- China Hong Kong City, which also houses office buildings, a hotel and a ferry terminal
- Cke, in the Chungking Mansions building
- Harbour City
- iSQUARE, opened in 2009
- K11 Art Mall, opened in 2009
- K11 MUSEA, opened in 2019
- Miramar Shopping Centre
- New World Centre
- Sogo, opened in 2005. It is now located below the Sheraton Hotel at No. 20 Nathan Road. It used to be located underground, below Salisbury Road. In March 2023, the Tsim Sha Tsui location of Sogo was closed to be relocated to Kai Tak.
- Silvercord, at the junction of Canton Road and Haiphong Road
- The ONE, built on the site of the former Tung Ying Building at No. 100 Nathan Road, at the corner with Granville Road

The Park Lane Shopper's Boulevard is located along a section of Nathan Road. The flagship stores of several luxury brands are located in the Tsim Sha Tsui section of Canton Road.

=== Parks ===
The largest park in Tsim Sha Tsui is Kowloon Park, a popular destination complete with swimming pools, aviary, children's playground, kung fu corner, sculpture garden and the Hong Kong Heritage Discovery Centre. Other parks and public open spaces include Signal Hill Garden at Blackhead Point, the Urban Council Centenary Garden in Tsim Sha Tsui East, Salisbury Garden, Middle Road Children's Playground and the Tsim Sha Tsui Promenade, which includes the Avenue of Stars, along the Victoria Harbour waterfront.

=== Museums and performance venues ===
Half of the major museums in Hong Kong are situated in Tsim Sha Tsui. The Hong Kong Space Museum, Hong Kong Museum of Art and the Hong Kong Cultural Centre are located at the southern waterfront. Hong Kong Museum of History and Hong Kong Science Museum are situated in Tsim Sha Tsui East. The Hong Kong Heritage Discovery Centre and the Health Education Exhibition and Resource Centre, located within Kowloon Park, are housed in preserved and restored blocks of the former Whitfield Camp.

=== Tourist attractions ===
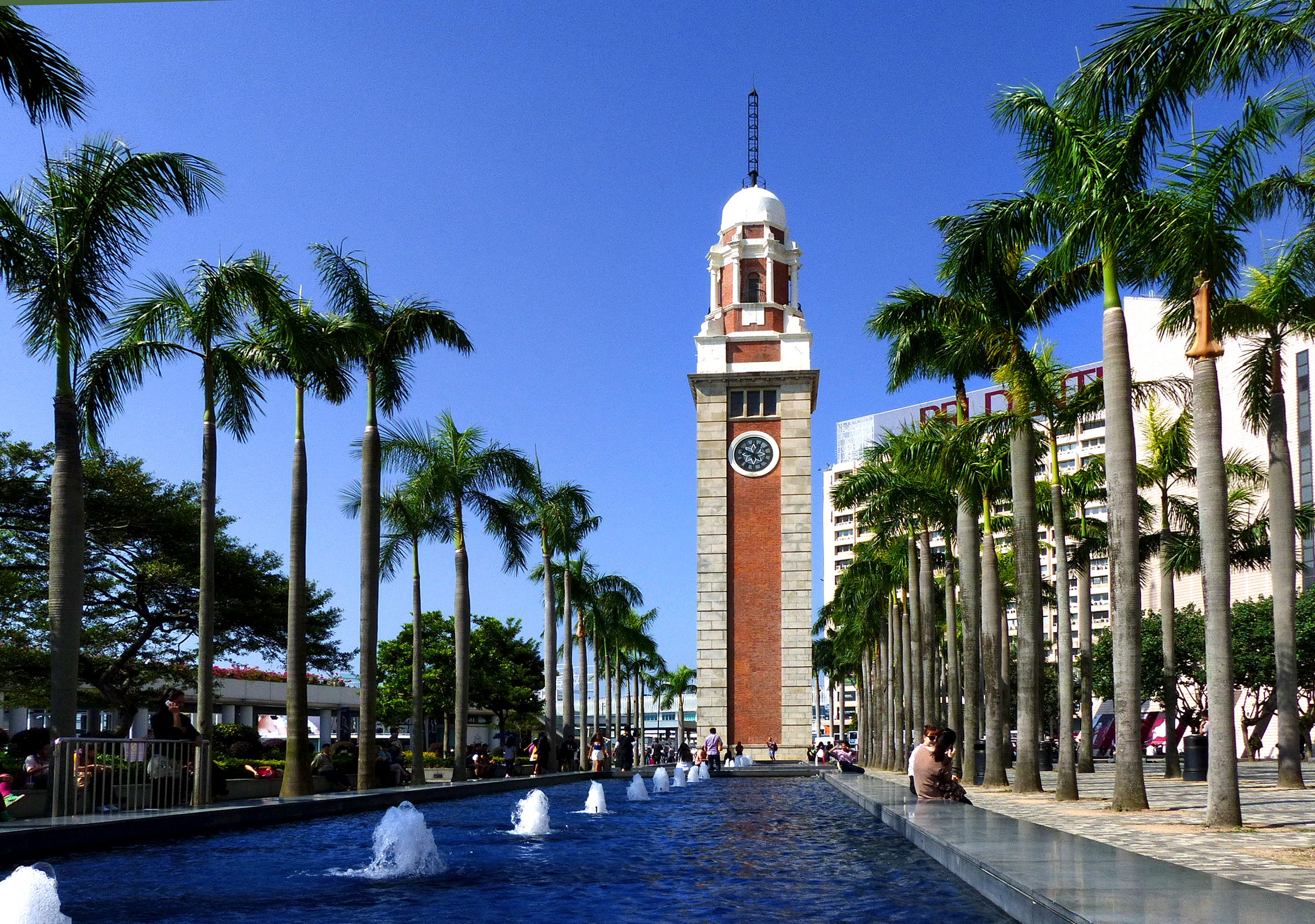
The former Kowloon-Canton Railway Clock Tower in Tsim Sha Tsui, a famous landmark of Hong Kong, in 2014

Tsim Sha Tsui was once the terminus of the Kowloon–Canton Railway (KCR). After the British Section of the railway was opened for traffic on 1 October 1910, the construction of the railway station in Tsim Sha Tsui started in 1913 and the station, with its clock tower, was completed in 1915. The station was relocated to Hung Hom to make way for the Hong Kong Space Museum and the Hong Kong Cultural Centre. The main building of the Tsim Sha Tsui station was demolished in 1978, but the Clock Tower was kept in place, and is all that remains of the station.

The clock tower is forty-four metres high, surmounted by a seven-metre-high (23-foot) lightning rod. It is now surrounded by the public piazza of the Cultural Centre and has become a landmark of Hong Kong. Six pillars of the railway were relocated to the Urban Council Centenary Garden in TST East. The Avenue of Stars starts at the "New World Centre" shopping centre near the Cultural Centre. There is also the attraction of shopping at a clothing store frequented by famous people from all over the world, at Sam's Tailor.

The Tsim Sha Tsui waterfront is another popular destination for locals and tourists alike. It is especially popular for photographers, as it offers an unobstructed view of the Central area of Hong Kong across Victoria Harbour. The Star Ferry terminal is another popular attraction for tourists, and the Avenue of Stars is also popular with photographers.

== East Tsim Sha Tsui ==
East Tsim Sha Tsui or Tsim Sha Tsui East (尖沙咀東 or simply 尖東) is an area east of Chatham Road South reclaimed from Hung Hom Bay in the 1970s. The Tsim Sha Tsui East Promenade links the area with the Hong Kong Cultural Centre near the Clock Tower. In 2004, the East Rail line returned to Tsim Sha Tsui with the extension of the line from Hung Hom to the new East Tsim Sha Tsui station, which serves as an interchange station with Tsim Sha Tsui station on the Tsuen Wan line. Unlike other East Rail line stations, it was built underground near Blackhead Point. An extensive tunnel system was constructed for pedestrians to access the most popular destinations in Tsim Sha Tsui, and to change trains between the two lines.

East Tsim Sha Tsui is the last district in Hong Kong to use a grid plan system before the Hong Kong government adopted its high land price policy, meaning that development in East Tsim Sha Tsui is less centralised than in newer districts. It is characterised by a large number of mid-rise buildings including hotels, offices and shopping centres. Pedestrian plazas are located in between the buildings.

In 2005, there were 15 office buildings and 5 hotels in Tsim Sha Tsui East:

- Office buildings: New Mandarin Plaza, Chinachem Golden Plaza, South Seas Center, Harbor Crystal Center, East Ocean Center, Energy Plaza, Hilton Towers, Inter-Continental Plaza, Auto Plaza, Mirror Tower, Houston Center, Wing On Plaza, Tsim Sha Tsui Centre and Empire Center.
- Hotels: The Royal Garden Hotel, Regal Kowloon Hotel, Kowloon Shangri-La, Grand Stanford Harbor View Hotel and Hotel Nikko Hong Kong.

== Education ==
Tsim Sha Tsui is in Primary One Admission (POA) School Net 31. Within the school net are multiple aided schools (operated independently but funded with government money) and Jordan Road Government Primary School.

Hong Kong Public Libraries operates Tsim Sha Tsui Public Library in Concordia Plaza, Tsim Sha Tsui East.

== Streets ==
Streets in Tsim Sha Tsui include:

- Ashley Road (亞士厘道)
- Blenheim Avenue (白蘭軒道)
- Bristol Avenue (碧仙桃路)
- Cameron Road
- Canton Road
- Carnarvon Road
- Granville Road
- Haiphong Road
- Hankow Road
- Hanoi Road
- Hart Avenue
- Hau Fook Street (厚福街)
- Humphrey's Avenue (堪富利士道)
- Ichang Street (宜昌街)
- Kimberley Road
- Kimberley Street
- Knutsford Terrace
- Middle Road. Located in the southern part of Tsim Sha Tsui, across Nathan Road and parallel to Salisbury Road. When people leave East Tsim Sha Tsui station, they can do so through Middle Road. The road has a playground named Middle Road Children's Playground that is located on top of the MTR station.
- Minden Row
- Mody Road
- Nathan Road
- Observatory Road
- Peking Road
- Salisbury Road

== Culture ==
Some depictions of the cartoon cat Din Dong appear throughout the city. A statue in the Avenue of Comic Stars was built in Kowloon Park.

== Public transport ==
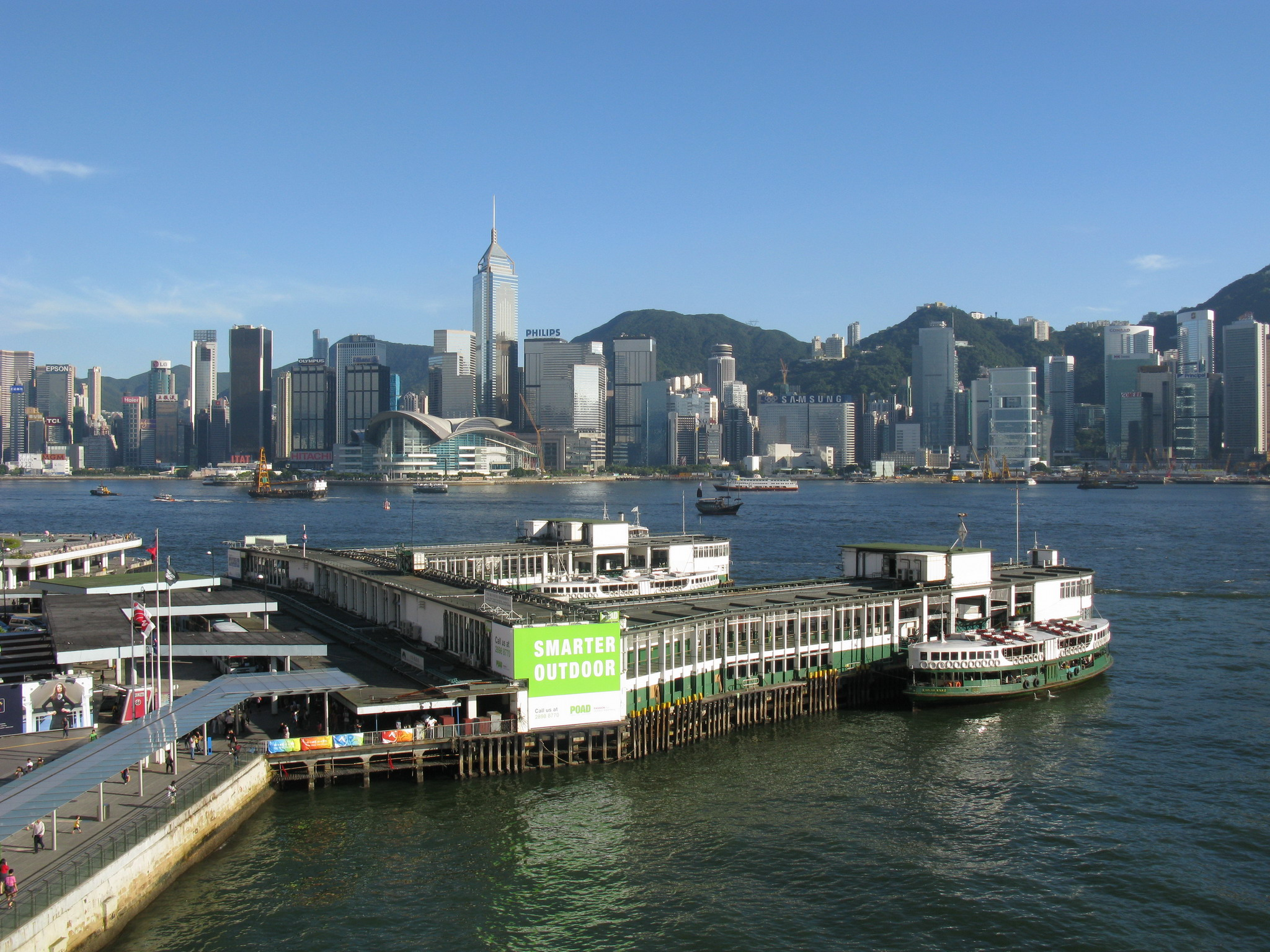
The Tsim Sha Tsui Pier of the Star Ferry, with Hong Kong Island in the background.

=== Trains ===
Tsim Sha Tsui is served by the MTR Tsim Sha Tsui station, on the Tsuen Wan line. Another station, East Tsim Sha Tsui station, opened in late 2004 as a southern extension of the East Rail line from Hung Hom station. On 16 August 2009, the Kowloon Southern Link of the West Rail line, from Nam Cheong station to East Tsim Sha Tsui station was opened. Simultaneously, the segment between East Tsim Sha Tsui station and Hung Hom station was transferred from the East Rail line to the West Rail line, so Hung Hom station is now the interchange station between the East Rail line and the West Rail line. East Tsim Sha Tsui station is connected to Tsim Sha Tsui Station and a number of locations in the area though an extensive pedestrian subway network. On 27 June 2021, the Tuen Ma line replaced the West Rail line.

=== Ferries ===
The Star Ferry connects Tsim Sha Tsui to Central and Wan Chai. Various hydrofoil services out of the Hong Kong China Ferry Terminal on Canton Road link Tsim Sha Tsui to Macau, Guangzhou, and several other places in the Pearl River Delta. They depart from China Hong Kong City, located near Harbour City.

=== Buses ===
Since Tsim Sha Tsui is in the heart of Kowloon Peninsula, the area is served by an extensive network of bus routes to many parts of Hong Kong. There are major bus terminals beside the Star Ferry terminal and atop East Tsim Sha Tsui underground station on Chatham Road.

== Other places in the area ==
- Fok Tak Temple (dated back to 1900)
- Former Kowloon British School
- Former Marine Police Headquarters (now incorporated into a shopping centre)
- Hong Kong Observatory
- Ocean Terminal
- Tsim Sha Tsui Ferry Pier (Star Ferry)

== Gallery ==
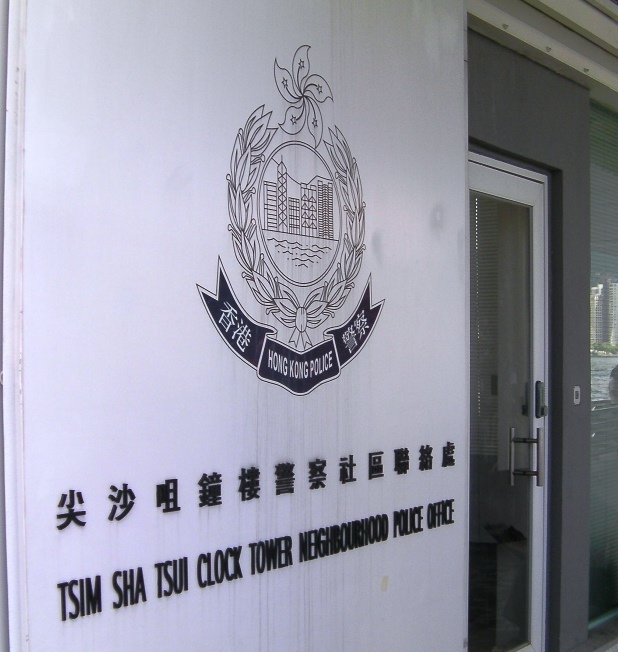
Tsim Sha Tsui Clocktower Neighbourhood Police Service

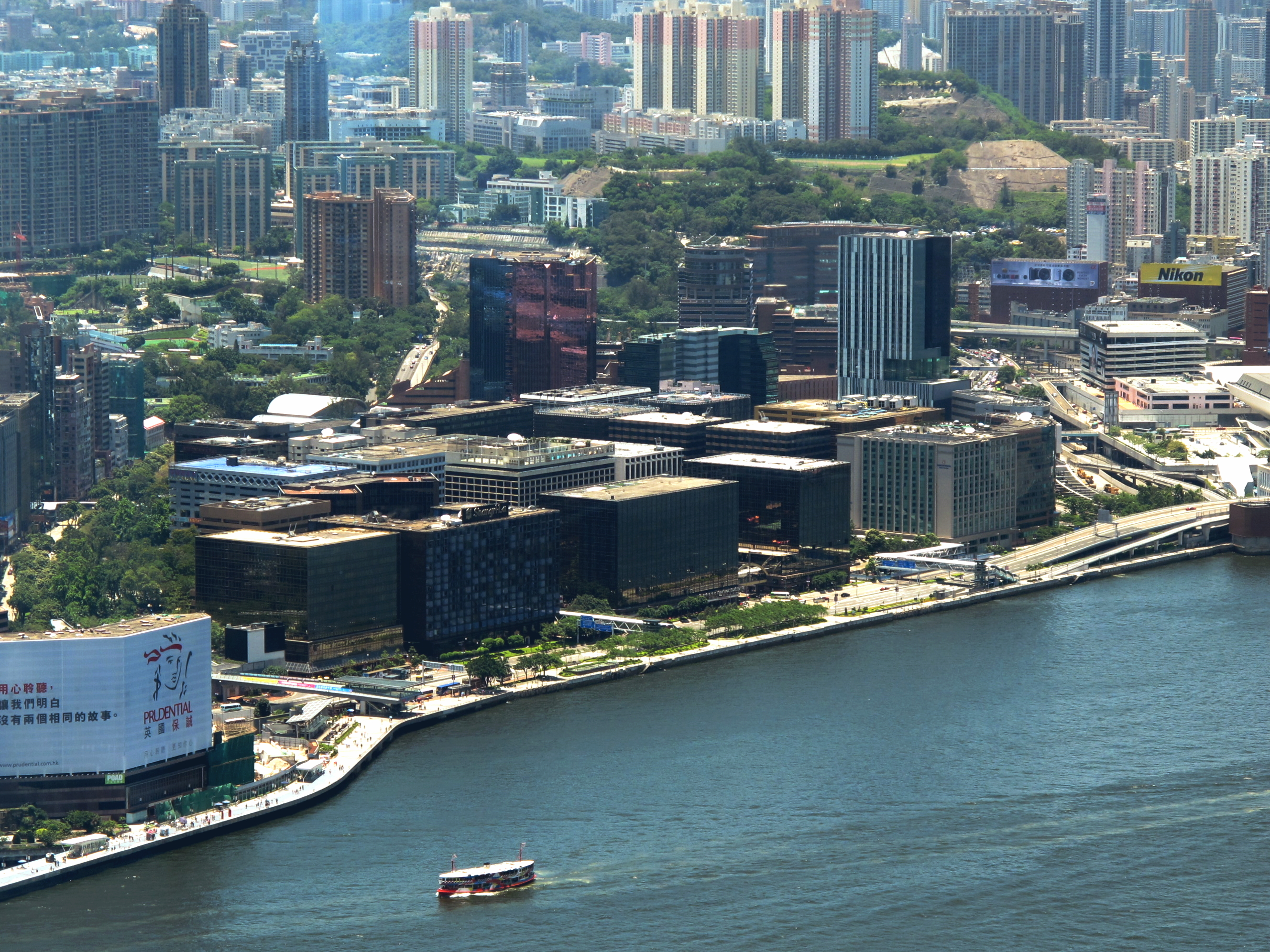
Tsim Sha Tsui East.

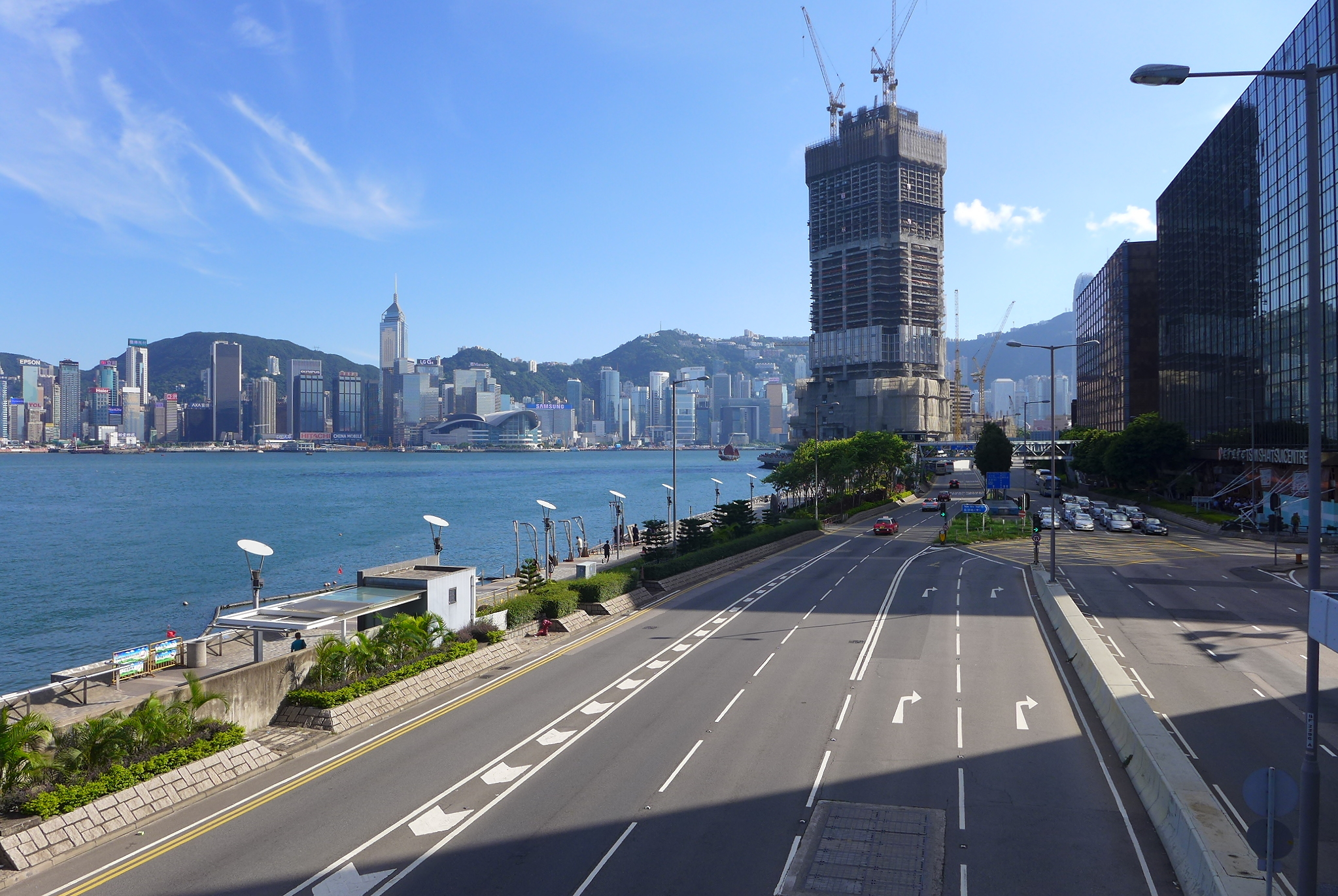
Salisbury Road in East Tsim Sha Tsui.

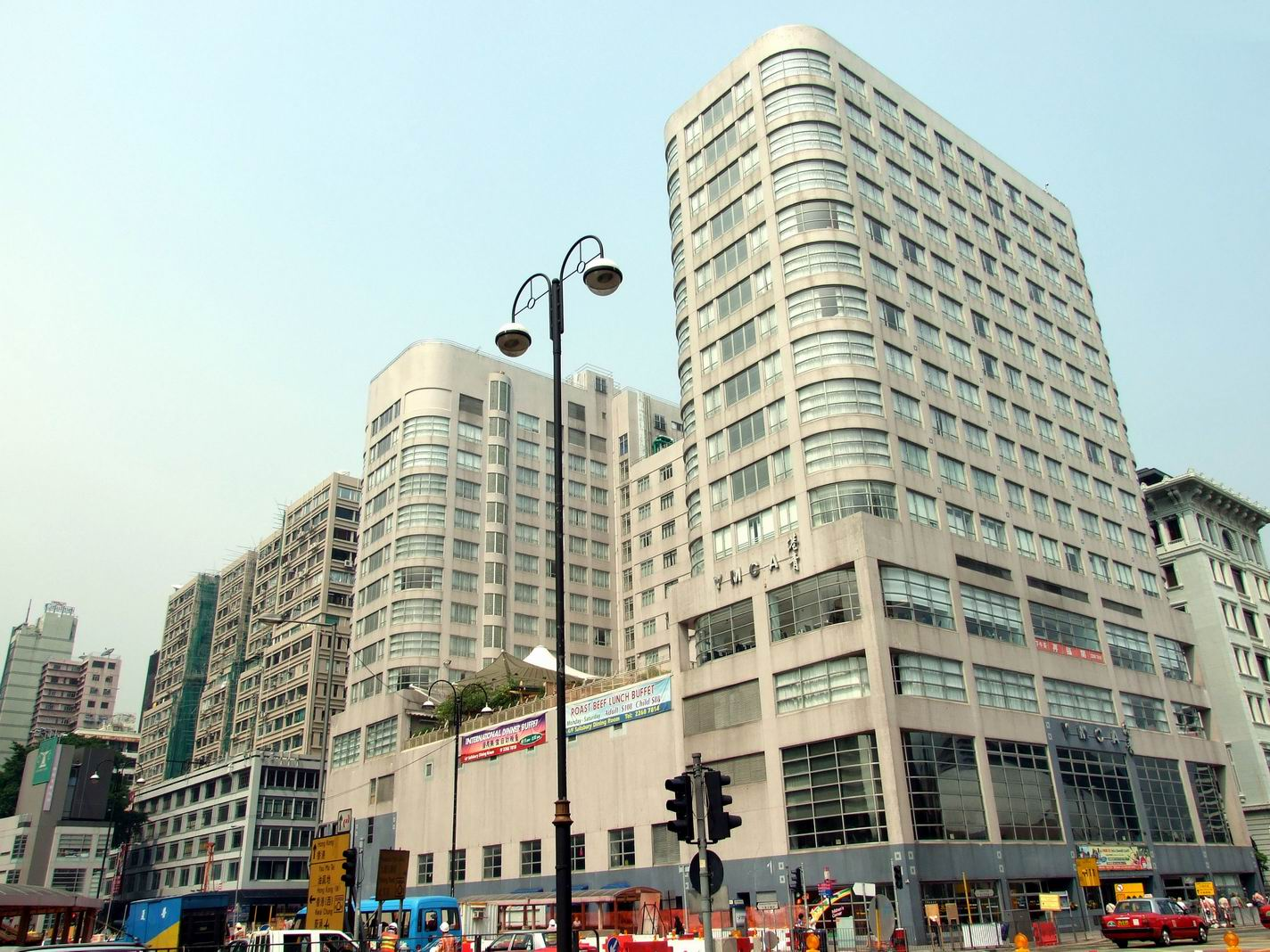
The Salisbury, YMCA of Hong Kong

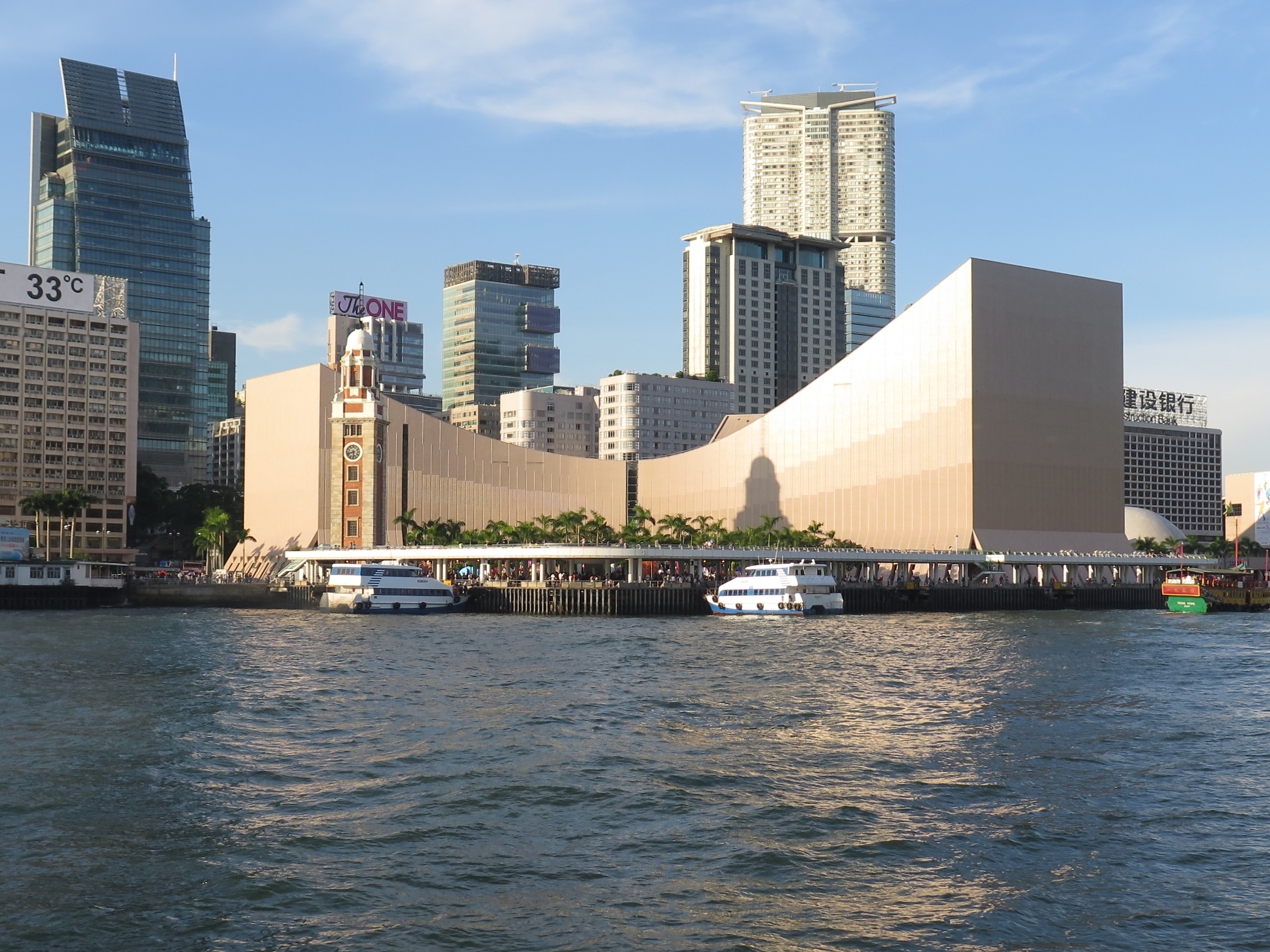
Hong Kong Cultural Centre

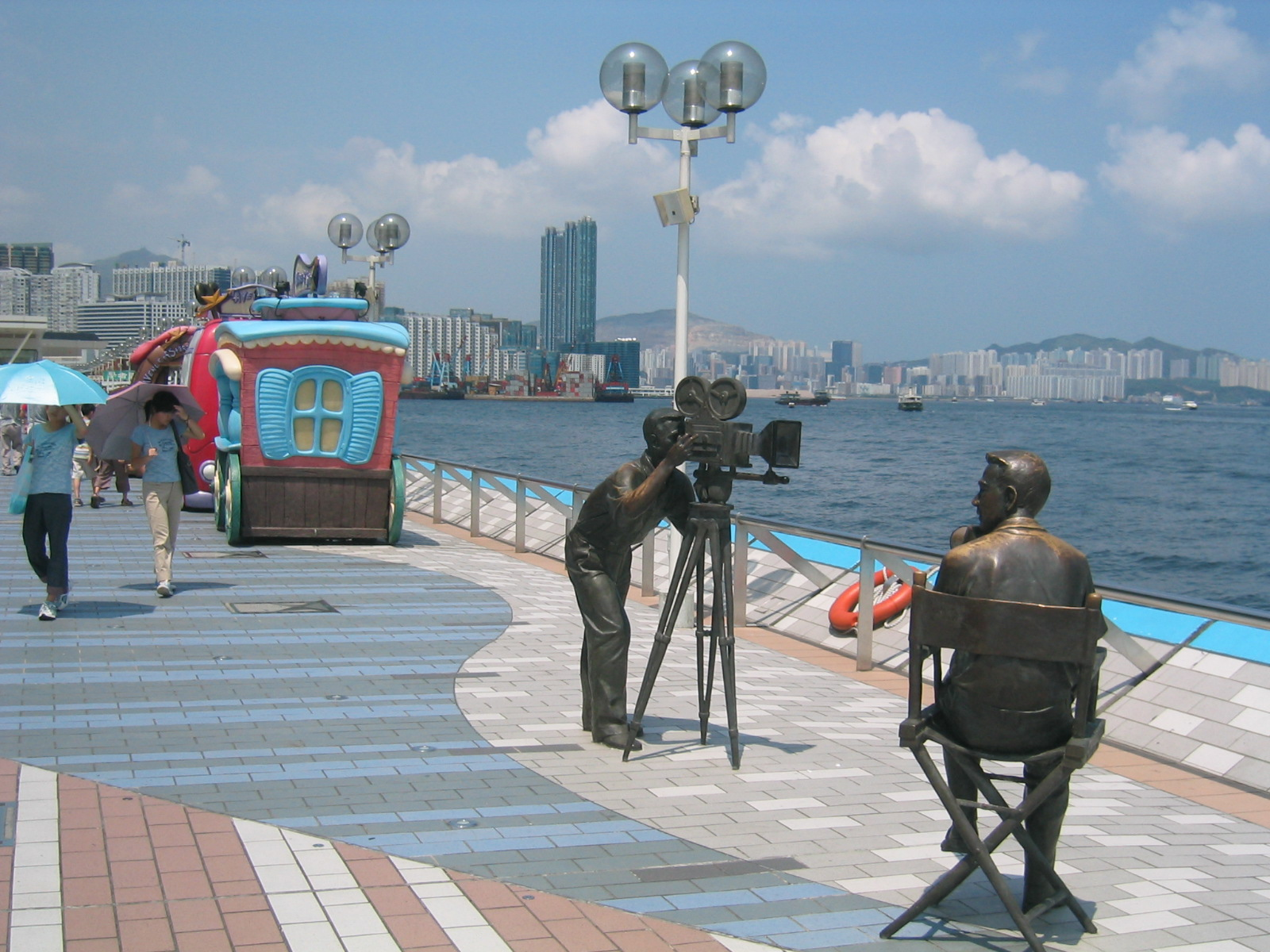
The Avenue of Stars

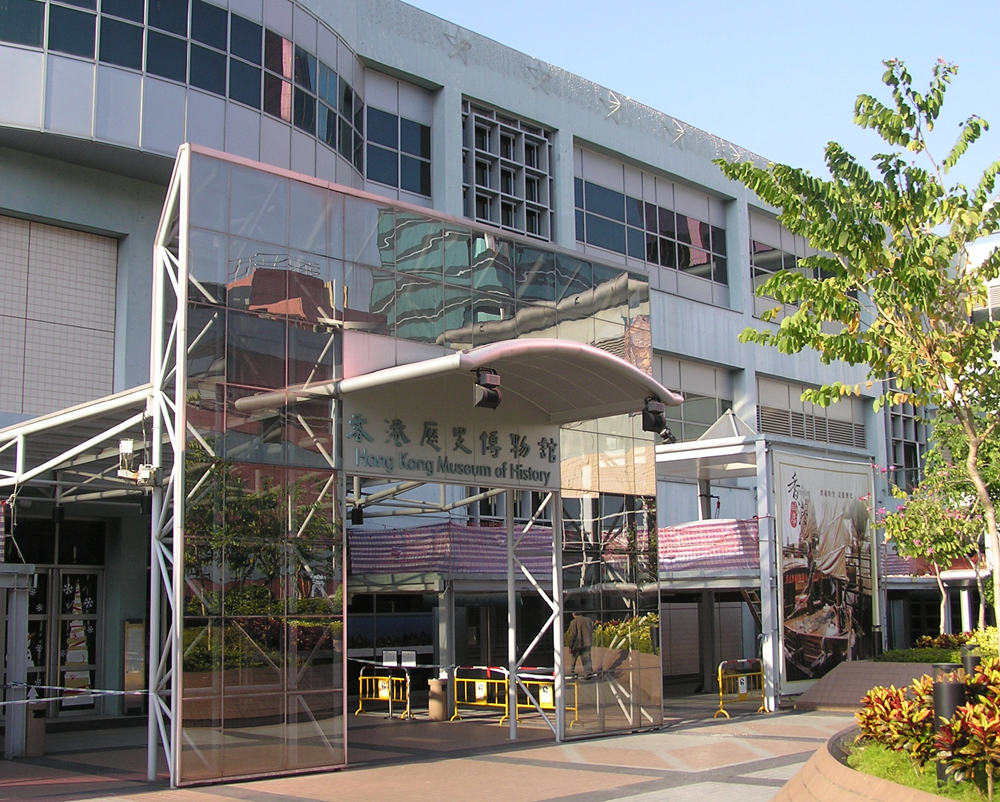
Hong Kong Museum of History

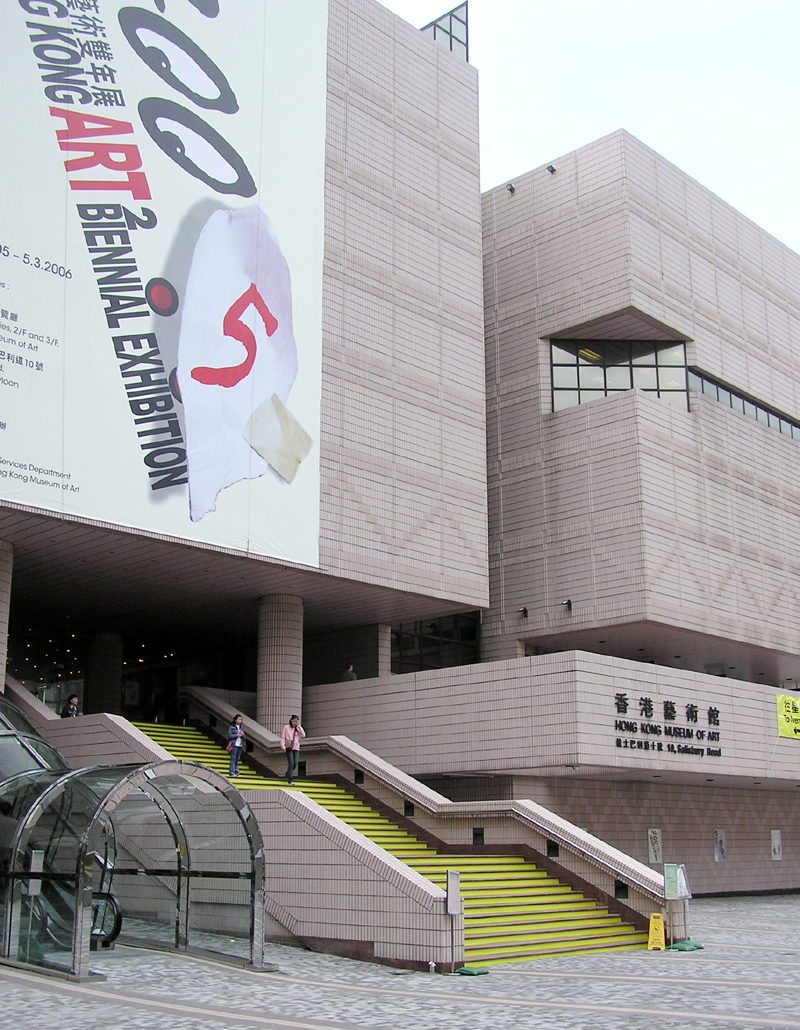
The Hong Kong Museum of Art

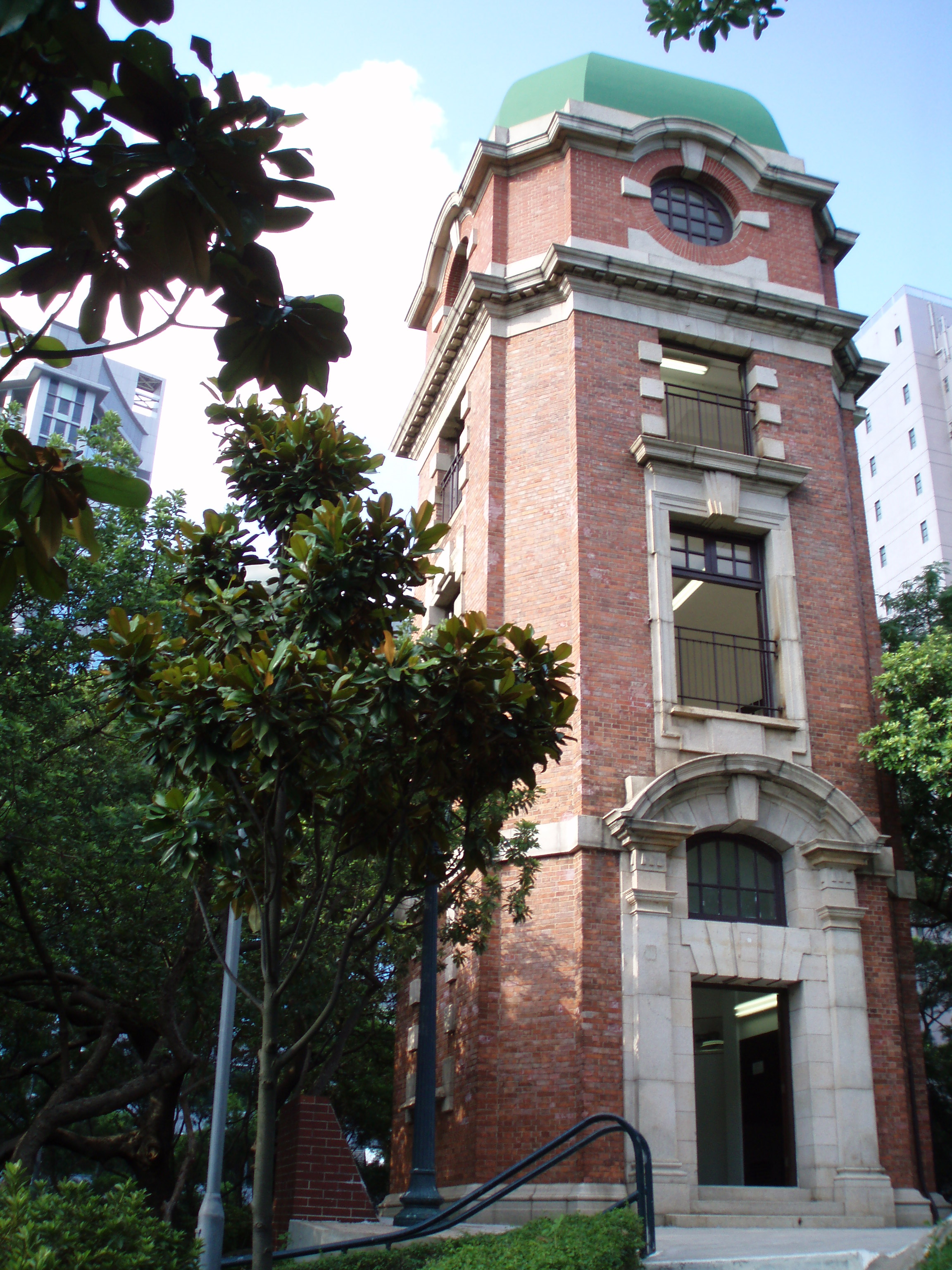
Signal Hill Tower

== See also ==
- List of areas of Hong Kong
- Mong Kok
- Causeway Bay
