= Observatory Hill (Hong Kong) =

Hill in Tsim Sha Tsui, Hong Kong

Coordinates: 22.3021°N 114.1736°E

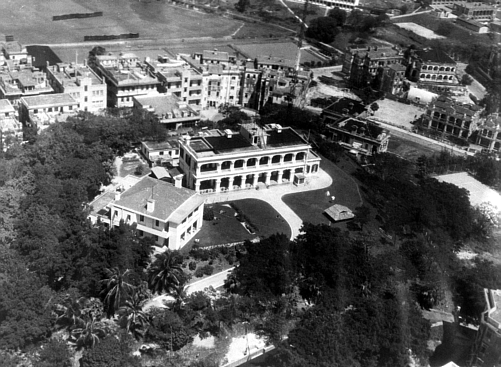
Hong Kong Observatory at Observatory Hill in the 1950s.

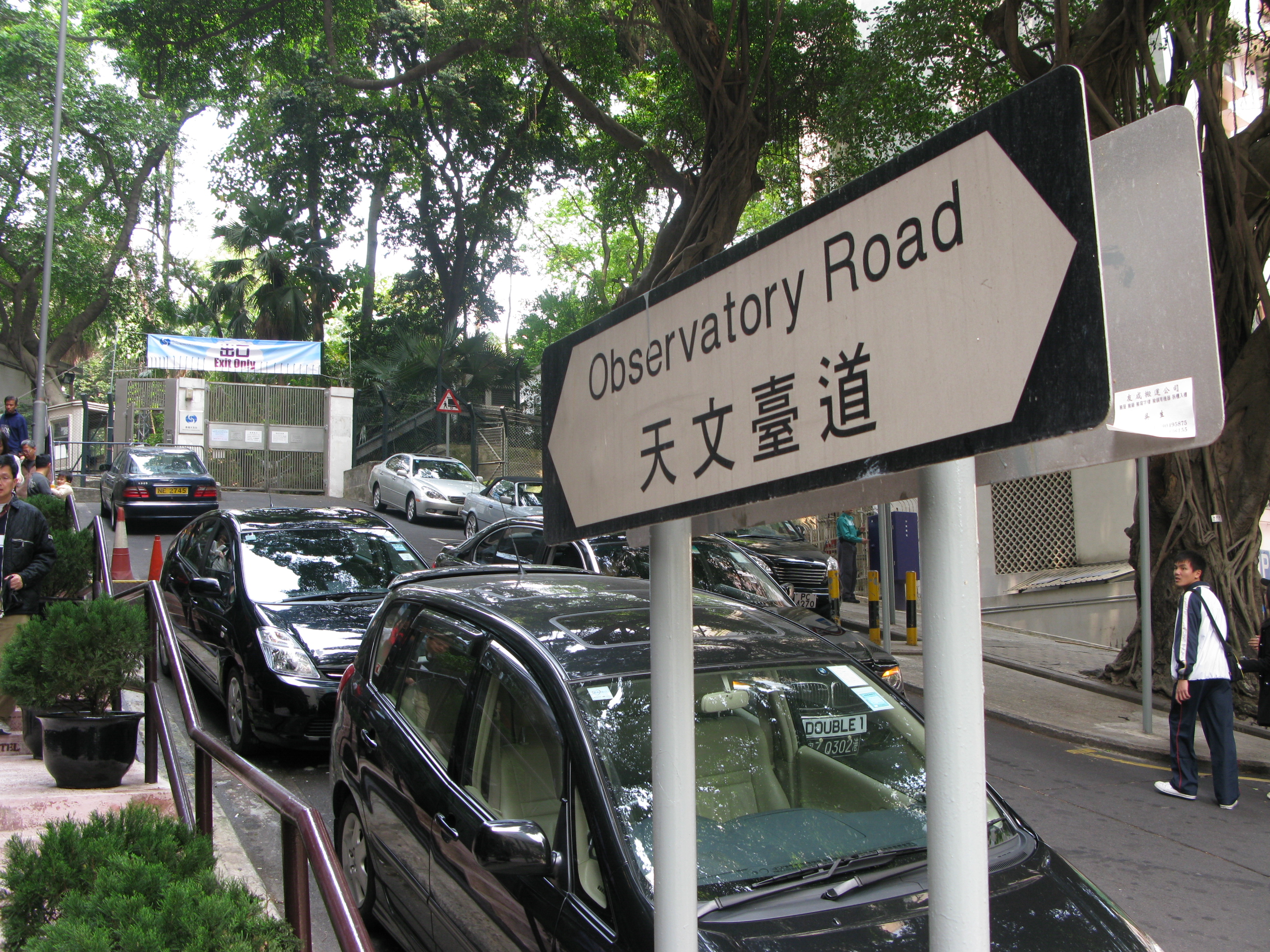
Observatory Road on Observatory Hill.

Observatory Hill (Chinese: 天文臺山), formerly known as Elgin Hill (伊利近山), is a hill where the Hong Kong Observatory is sited. Observatory Road is a road passing through Royal Observatory Hong Kong from east to west. Both its south slope Knutsford Terrace and north slope Hillwood Road are full of restaurants, pubs and bars.
