= Kimberley Road =

Street in Tsim Sha Tsui, Hong Kong

Coordinates: 22.30075°N 114.17375°E

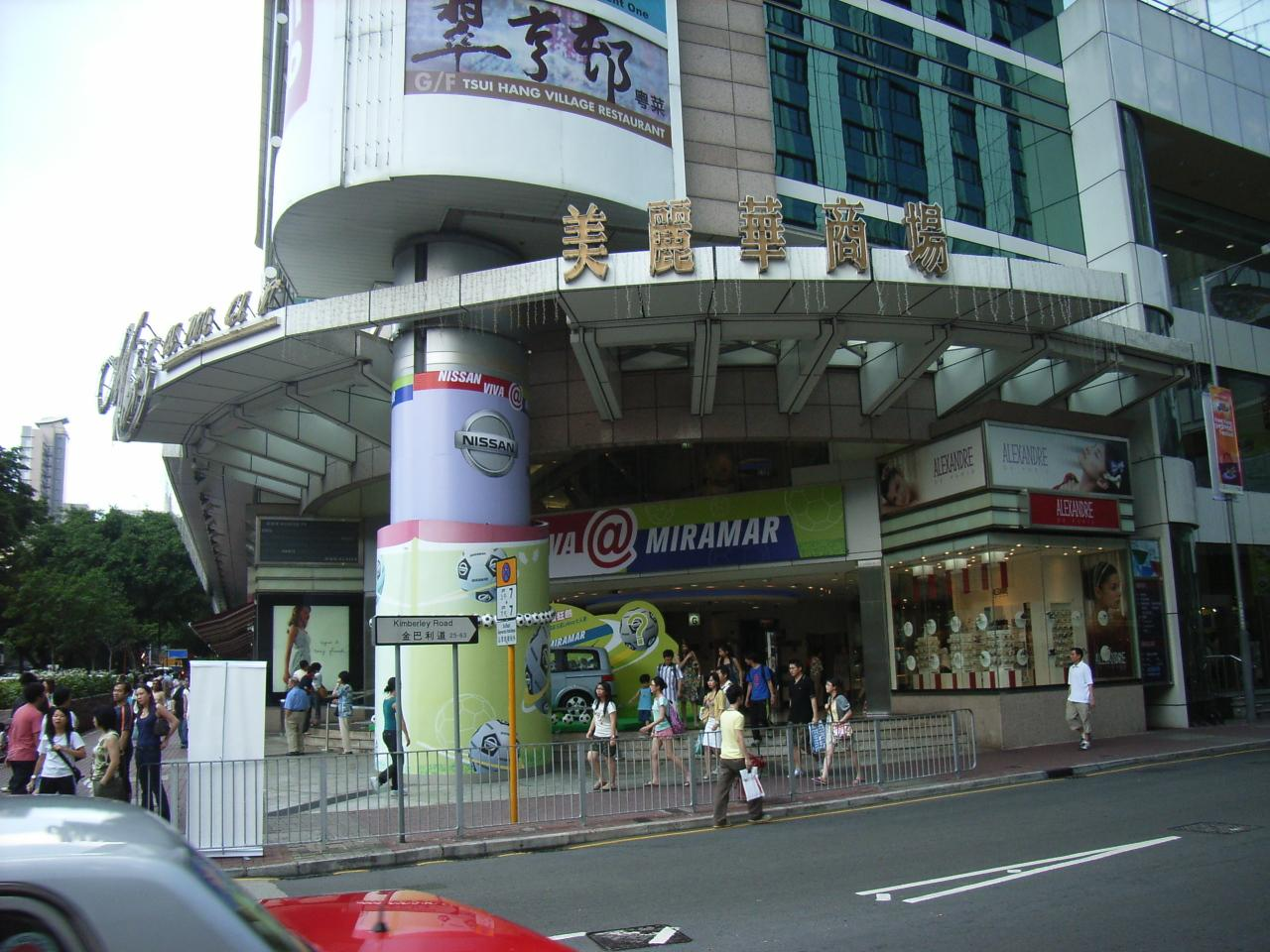
The Miramar Shopping Centre at the western end of Kimberley Road, at the intersection with Nathan Road in November 2006.

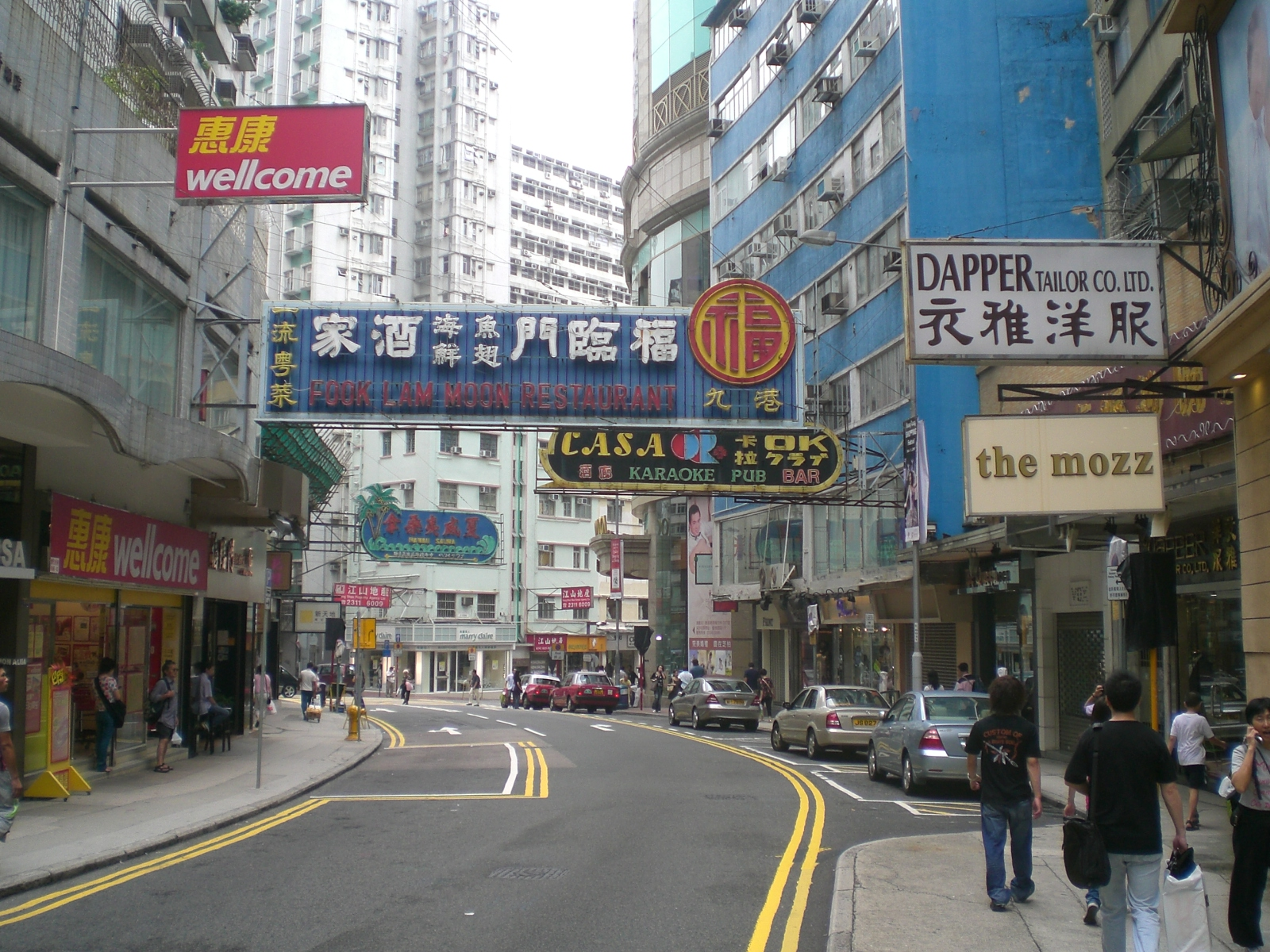
Kimberley Road, looking east, near the intersection with Observatory Road in August 2007.

Kimberley Road (Chinese: 金巴利道) is a road in Tsim Sha Tsui, Kowloon, Hong Kong.

== Location ==
Starting at Nathan Road in the west, it runs eastwards until Observatory Road and continues northeastwards. The Road runs parallel to and north of Kimberley Street, Cameron Road and Granville Road.

== Name ==
The road first appeared on the Rates List for 1897/8. John Wodehouse, 1st Earl of Kimberley gave his name to this road. He was a Secretary of State for the Colonies from July 1870 to February 1874 and served under the Prime Minister William Ewart Gladstone. In 1905, the road was extended from Observatory Road to Austin Road.

== Features ==
- Mira Place, located at No. 32 Nathan Road, at the corner of Kimberley Road
- The Mira Hong Kong, located at No. 118 Nathan Road, at the corner of Kimberley Road
- Kimberley Hotel, at No. 28 Kimberley Road
- Empire Hotel Kowloon, at No. 62 Kimberley Road, at the corner with Observatory Road

== Kimberley Street ==
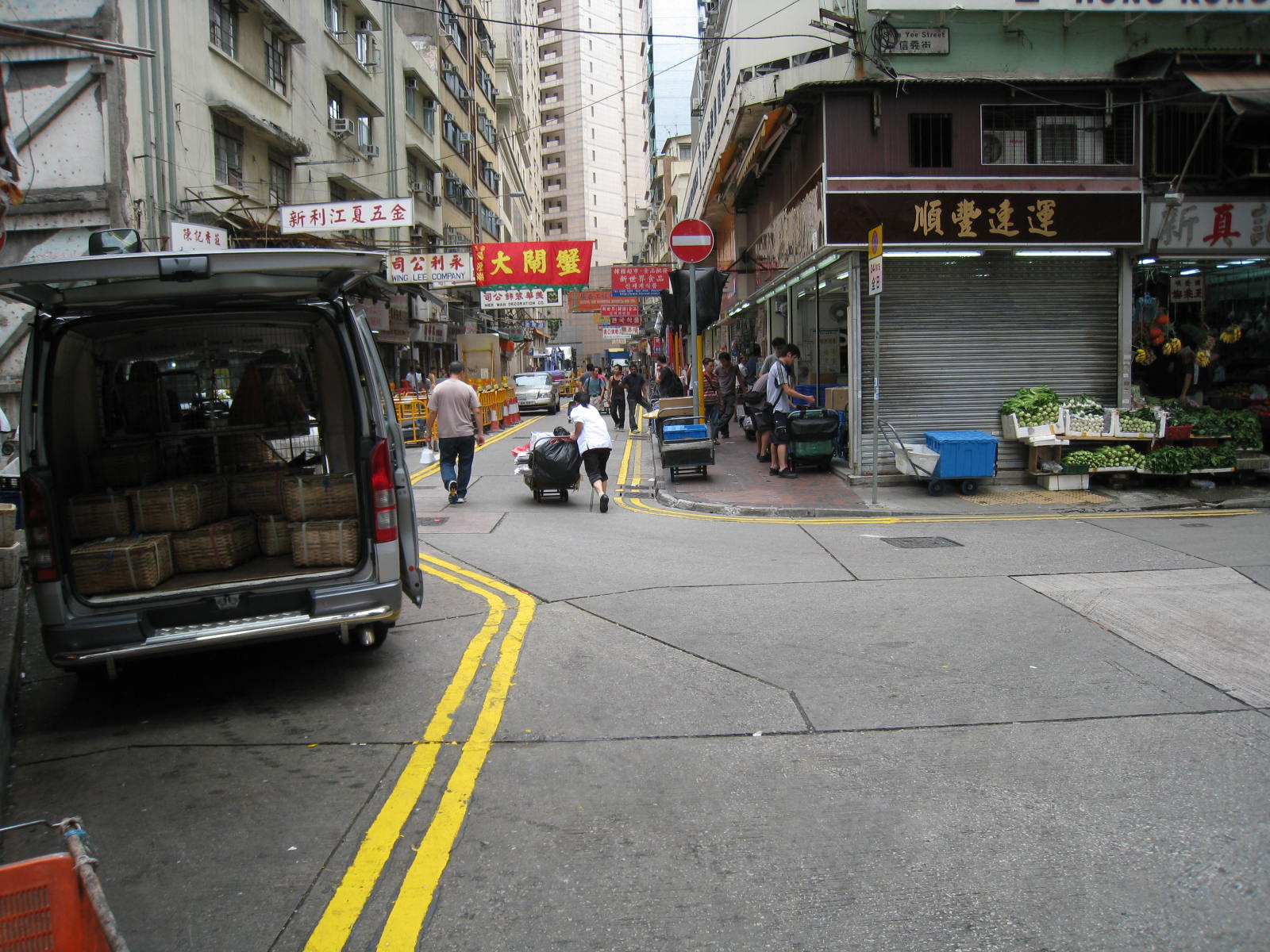
Kimberley Street, looking east in November 2008.

Kimberley Street (金巴利街) is a shorter street that runs parallel to Kimberley Road and Granville Road, between Observatory Road and Carnarvon Road. It is famous for its Korean restaurants and grocery stores, especially after the advent of the Korean Wave in Hong Kong. A Koreatown, the street is known locally by the nicknames "Korean Street" and "Little Korea" (小韓國).

== See also ==
- List of streets and roads in Hong Kong
