= Hong Kong Observatory =

Hong Kong meteorological agency

Coordinates: 22°18′09″N 114°10′27″E

- 香港天文台

Agency overview
- Formed: 2 March 1883; 143 years ago
- Headquarters: 134A Nathan Road, Tsim Sha Tsui, Kowloon, Hong Kong
- Employees: 315 (March 2018)
- Annual budget: 381.4m HKD (2019–20)
- Agency executive: Dr. Chan Pak-wai, Director of the Hong Kong Observatory
- Parent agency: Environment and Ecology Bureau
- Website: www.hko.gov.hk www.weather.gov.hk

Hong Kong Observatory
- Chinese: 香港天文台
Transcriptions
Standard Mandarin
- Hanyu Pinyin: Xiānggǎng Tiānwéntái
Yue: Cantonese
- Yale Romanization: Hēung góng tīn màhn tòih
- Jyutping: Hoeng1 gong2 tin1 man4 toi4

The Hong Kong Observatory is a weather forecast agency of the government of Hong Kong. The observatory forecasts the weather and issues warnings on weather-related hazards. It also monitors and makes assessments on radiation levels in Hong Kong and provides other meteorological and geophysical services to meet the needs of the public and the shipping, aviation, industrial and engineering sectors.

== Overview ==
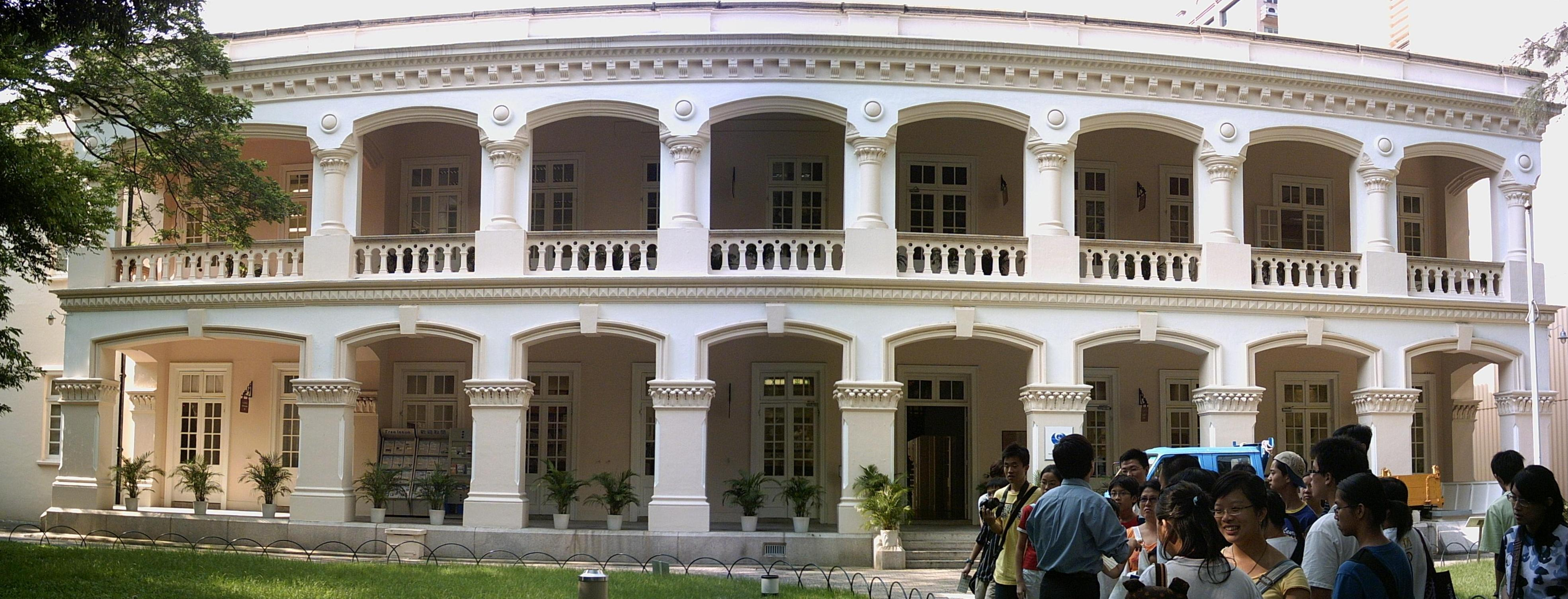
The 1883 building

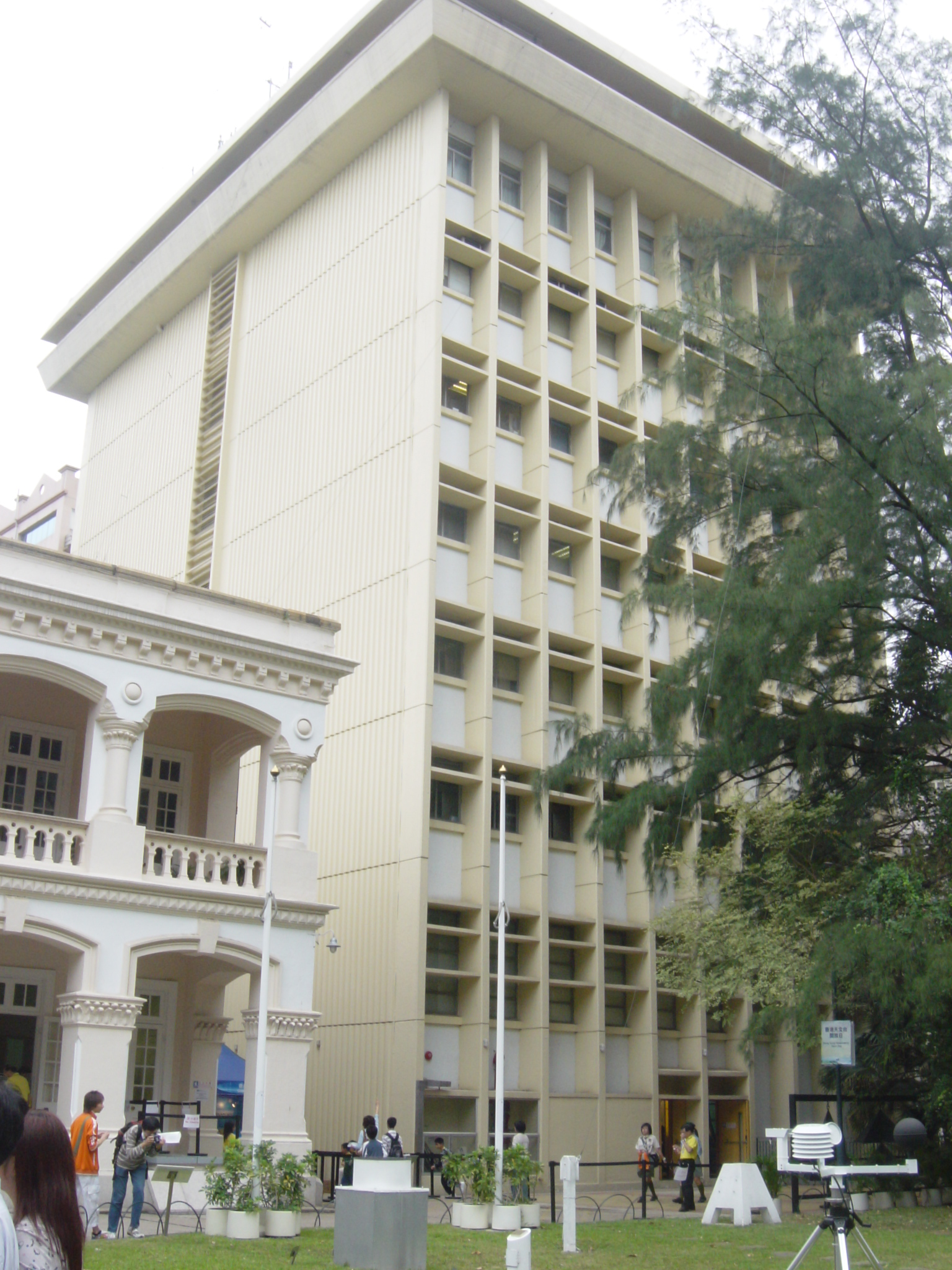
The Hong Kong Observatory Centenary Building

The Observatory was established on 2 March 1883 as the Hong Kong Observatory by Sir George Bowen, the 9th Governor of Hong Kong, with William Doberck (1852–1941) as its first director. Early operations included meteorological and magnetic observations, a time service based on astronomical observations and a tropical cyclone warning service. The Observatory was renamed the Royal Observatory Hong Kong (Chinese: 皇家香港天文台) after obtaining a Royal Charter in 1912. The Observatory adopted the current name and emblem in 1997 after the handover of Hong Kong from the United Kingdom to China.

The Hong Kong Observatory was built in Tsim Sha Tsui, Kowloon in 1883. Observatory Road in Tsim Sha Tsui is so named based on this landmark. However, due to rapid urbanisation, it is now surrounded by skyscrapers. As a result of high greenhouse gas emissions, the reflection of sunlight from buildings and the surfaces of roads, as well as the reduced vegetation, it suffers from a heat island effect. This was demonstrated by the considerable increase in average temperatures recorded by the Observatory between 1980 and 2005. In 2002, the Observatory opened a resource centre on the 23rd Floor of the nearby Miramar Tower, where the public can buy Hong Kong Observatory publications and access other meteorological information.

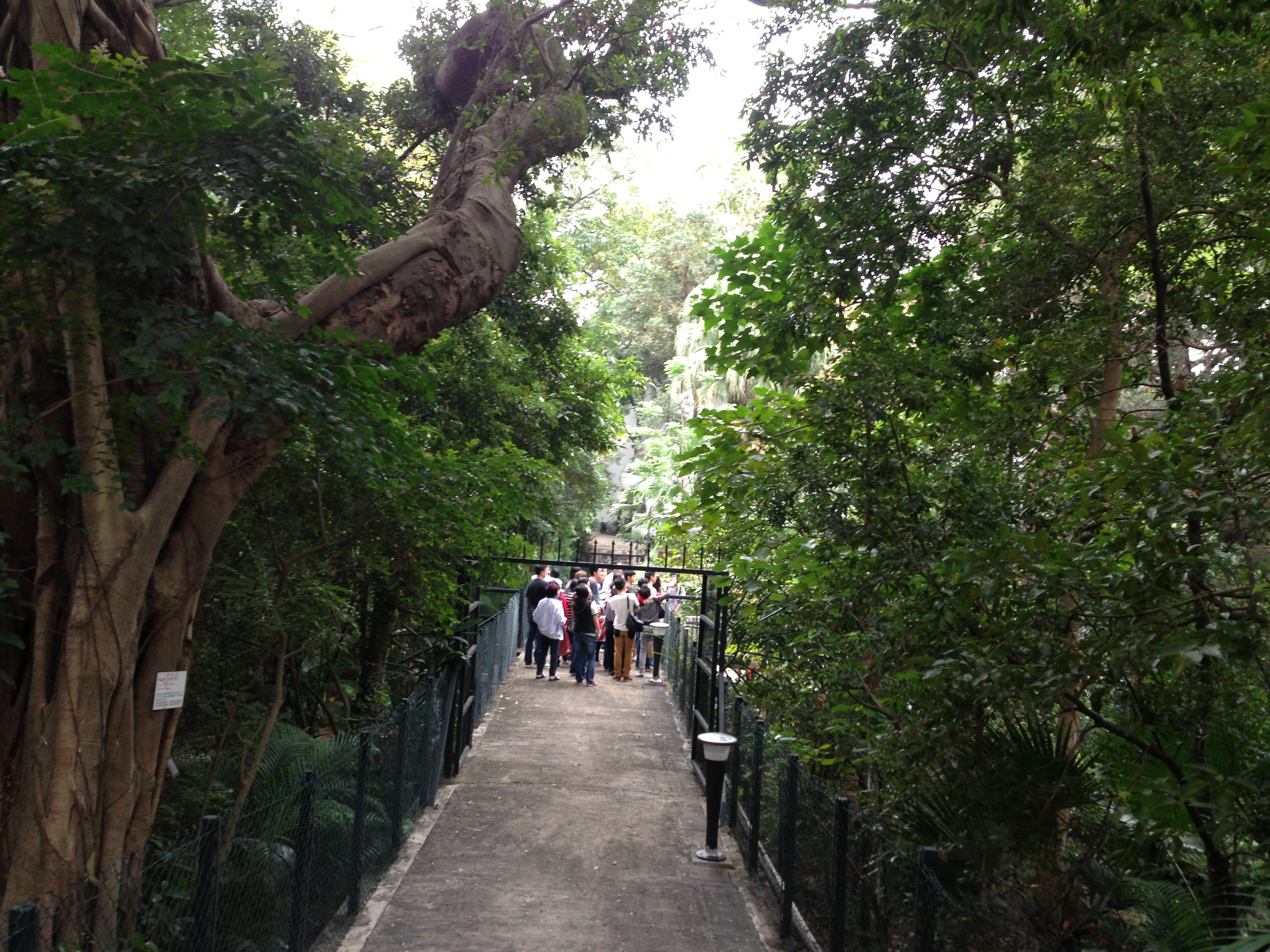
Hong Kong Observatory Grounds

== Buildings in the observatory ==
=== 1883 building ===
This building, built in 1883, is a rectangular two-storey plastered brick structure. It is characterised by arched windows and long verandas. It now houses the office of the directorate and serves as the centre of administration of the Observatory. The building is a declared monument of Hong Kong since 1984.

=== The Hong Kong Observatory Headquarters ===
This building is next to the 1883 Building; the Centenary Building, used as The Hong Kong Observatory Headquarters, was erected in 1983 as a commemoration of the centennial service of the Observatory.

== Directors ==
Over the years, the observatory has been led by

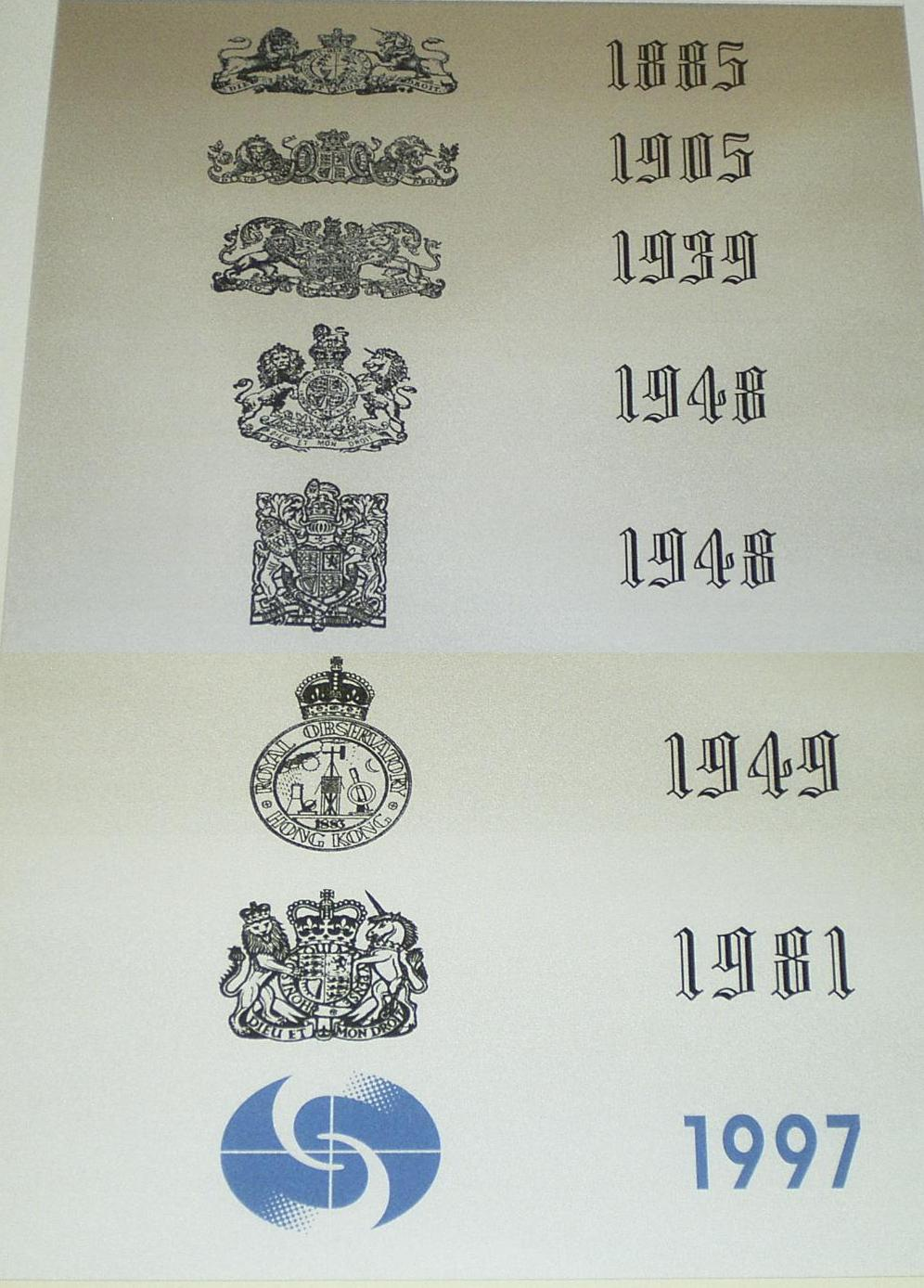
Signs of Hong Kong Observatory in different years.

#	Name	Tenure Start	Tenure End	Length of Tenure	Notes
1	William Doberck	2 March 1883	12 September 1907	24 years and 195 days	First Director; Longest serving Director
2	Frederick George Figg	13 September 1907	13 June 1912	4 years and 275 days	
3	Thomas Folkes Claxton	14 June 1912	8 July 1932	20 years and 25 days	Second Director to serve over 20 years
4	Charles William Jeffries	9 July 1932	20 June 1941	8 years and 347 days	
5	Benjamin Davis Evans	21 June 1941	30 April 1946	4 years and 314 days	Director through Japanese occupation
6	Graham Scudamore Percival Heywood	1 May 1946	7 April 1956	9 years and 343 days	
7	Ian Edward Mein Watts	8 April 1956	23 August 1965	9 years and 138 days	
8	Gordon John Bell	24 August 1965	16 January 1981	15 years and 146 days	
9	John Edgar Peacock	17 January 1981	14 March 1984	3 years and 58 days	Last British Director
10	Patrick Sham Pak	15 March 1984	25 May 1995	11 years and 72 days	First local Hong Kong Chinese Director
11	Robert Lau Chi-kwan	26 May 1995	21 December 1996	1 year and 210 days	
12	Lam Hung-kwan	22 December 1996	13 March 2003	6 years and 82 days	Director through the Handover
13	Lam Chiu Ying	14 March 2003	10 May 2009	6 years and 58 days	
14	Lee Boon-ying	11 May 2009	13 April 2011	1 year and 338 days	
15	Shun Chi-ming	14 April 2011	14 February 2020	8 years and 304 days	
16	Cheng Cho-ming	15 February 2020	12 March 2023	3 years and 26 days	
17	Chan Pak-wai	13 March 2023	Incumbent	3 years, 148 days	

== Observatory logo ==
From 1885 to 1948, the HKO used the coat of arms of the United Kingdom in various styles for its logo but in 1949, this was changed to a circular escutcheon featuring pictures of weather observation tools, with the year 1883 at the bottom and a St Edward's Crown at the top. In 1981, the logo was changed to the old coat of arms, and in 1997, with the transfer of sovereignty over Hong Kong, the current logo was introduced to replace the colonial symbols.

== Outreach activities and publicity ==
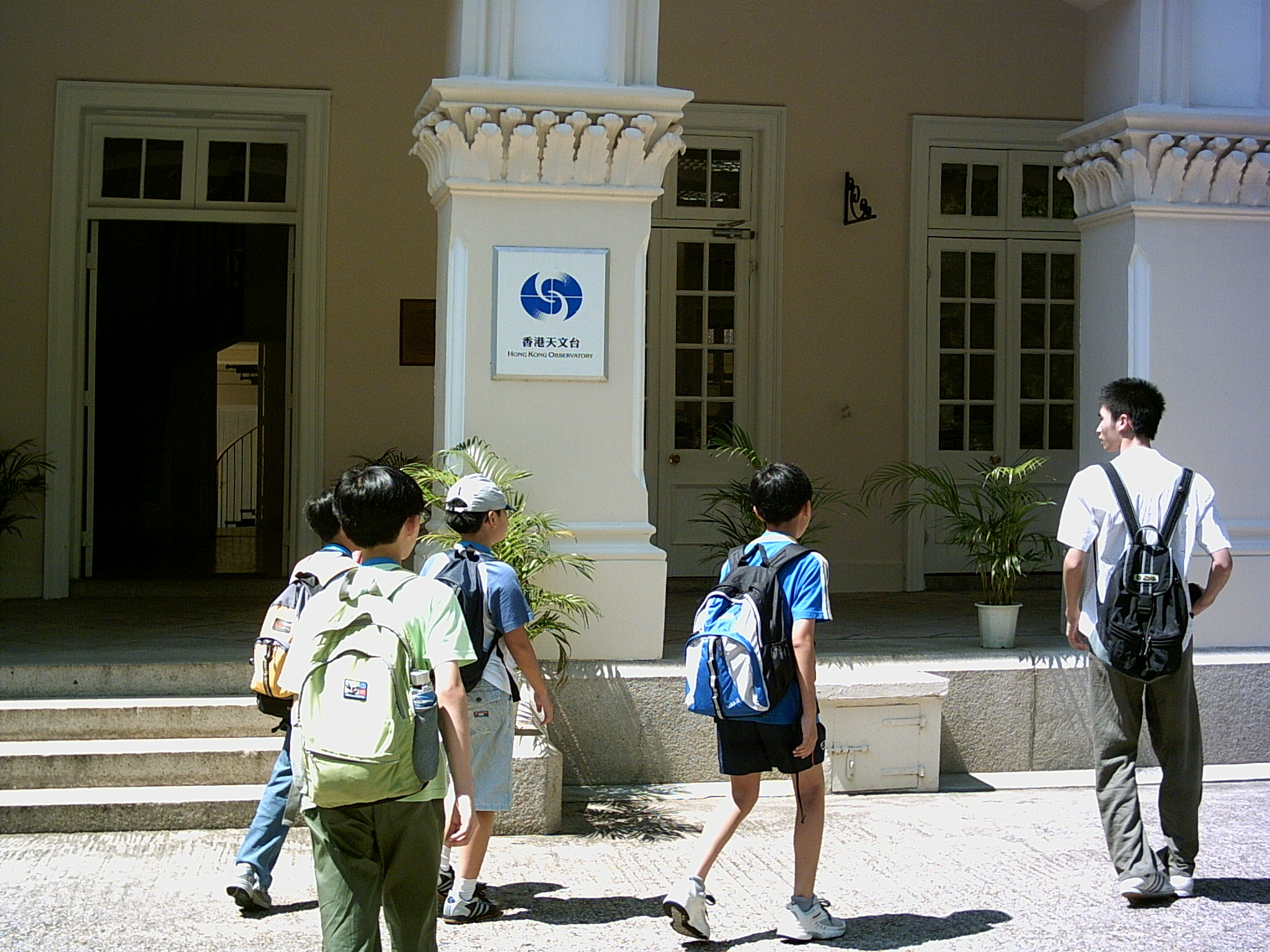
Young visitors at the Observatory

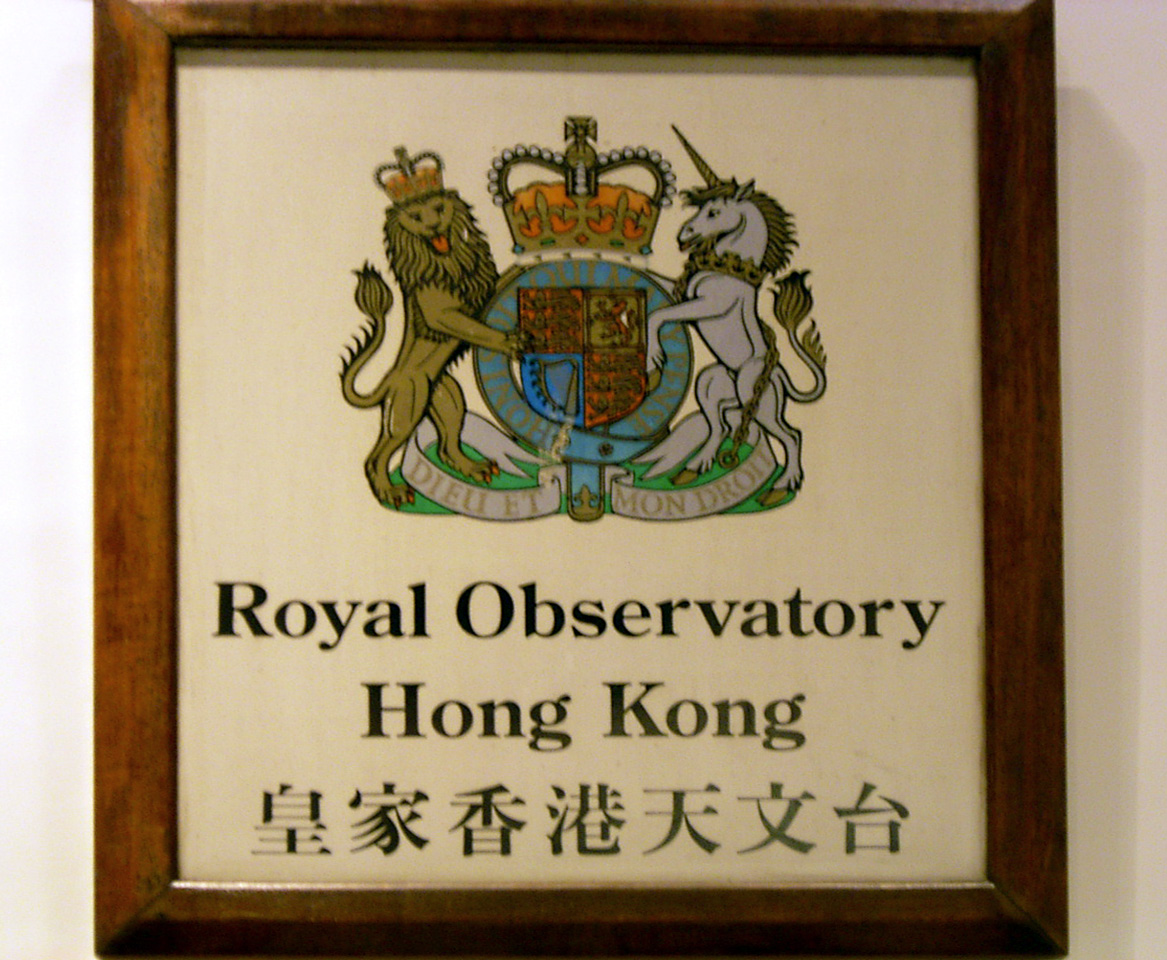
A sign with the old name before 1997

The Friends of the Observatory, an interest group set up in 1996 to help the Observatory to promote Hong Kong Observatory and its services to the public, provide science extension activities in relation to the works of the Observatory and foster communication between the Observatory and the public, now has more than 7,000 individual and family members in total. Activities organised for the Friends of the Observatory include regular science lectures and visits to Observatory's facilities. Newsletters (named "Weather Chit Chat", Chinese: 談天說地) were also published for members once every four months. Voluntary docents from this interest group lead a "HKO Guided Tour" to let the public who applied for visit in advance to visit the headquarters of the Observatory, and learn about the history, environment and meteorological science applied by the Observatory.

The Observatory regularly organises visits for secondary school students. This outreach programme was extended to primary school students, the elderly and community groups in recent years. Talks are also organised in primary schools during the winter time, when officials are less busy in the severe climate issues and watchouts. A roving exhibition for the public was also mounted in shopping malls in 2003. To promote understanding of the services provided by the Observatory and their benefits to the community, over 50 press releases were issued and 7 media briefings were held in 2003. From time to time, the Observatory also works closely with schools for a series of events, including with the Geography Society of PLK Vicwood KT Chong Sixth Form College between 2008 and 2009.

== See also ==
- Central Weather Bureau (Taiwan)
- China Meteorological Administration
- Climate of Hong Kong
- Hong Kong rainstorm warning signals
- Hong Kong Time
- Hong Kong tropical cyclone warning signals
- Macao Meteorological and Geophysical Bureau
