= Mira Place =

Shopping centre in Tsim Sha Tsui, Hong Kong

miraplace
- 美麗華廣場

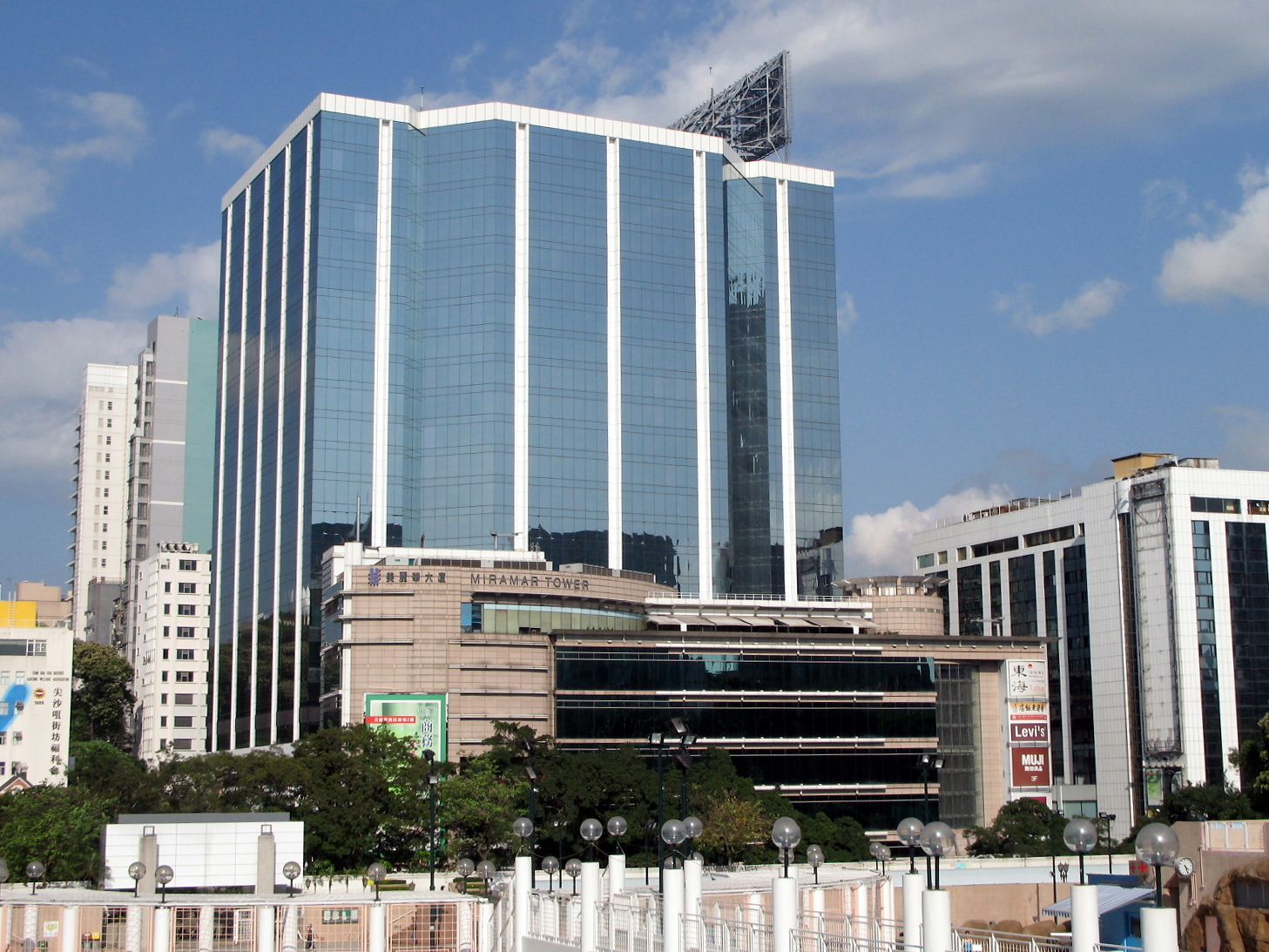
- Miramar Shopping Centre, with the Miramar Tower
- Location: Tsim Sha Tsui, Kowloon, Hong Kong
- Coordinates: 22.3010°N 114.1721°E
- Address: 132 Nathan Road
- Opened: 1996; 30 years ago (renovated in 2008)
- Owner: Miramar Hotel and Investment
- Num. of stores: 100+
- Floor area: 400,000 sq ft (37,000 m^{2})
- Floors: 6 retail floors. 7-level annexed podium
- Website: https://www.miraplace.com.hk

Mira Place
- Traditional Chinese: 美麗華廣場
- Simplified Chinese: 美丽华广场
Transcriptions
Standard Mandarin
- Hanyu Pinyin: Měilì Huá Shāngchǎng
Yue: Cantonese
- Jyutping: mei5 lai6 faa1 kong1 coeng4

Mira Place (Chinese: 美麗華廣場; Jyutping: mei5 lai6 waa4 gwong2 coeng4) is a commercial complex located in Tsim Sha Tsui, Kowloon, Hong Kong.

It comprises two connected shopping malls, Mira Place 1 and Mira Place 2, an office tower, Mira Place Tower A (formerly Miramar Tower) and a hotel, The Mira Hong Kong.

Mira Place 1, formerly Miramar Shopping Centre, is located at 132 Nathan Road, at the corner with Kimberley Road. It has six retail floors, a seven-level annexed podium and 400,000 square feet (37,000 m^{2}) of shopping space with over 100 stores.

It is connected by a skyway to Mira Place 2, formerly Mira Mall, a smaller shopping centre located at 118-130 Nathan Road, owned by the same company. It is home to the first branch of Don Don Donki in Hong Kong.
