= East Tsim Sha Tsui station =

MTR interchange station in Kowloon, Hong Kong

East Tsim Sha Tsui 尖東
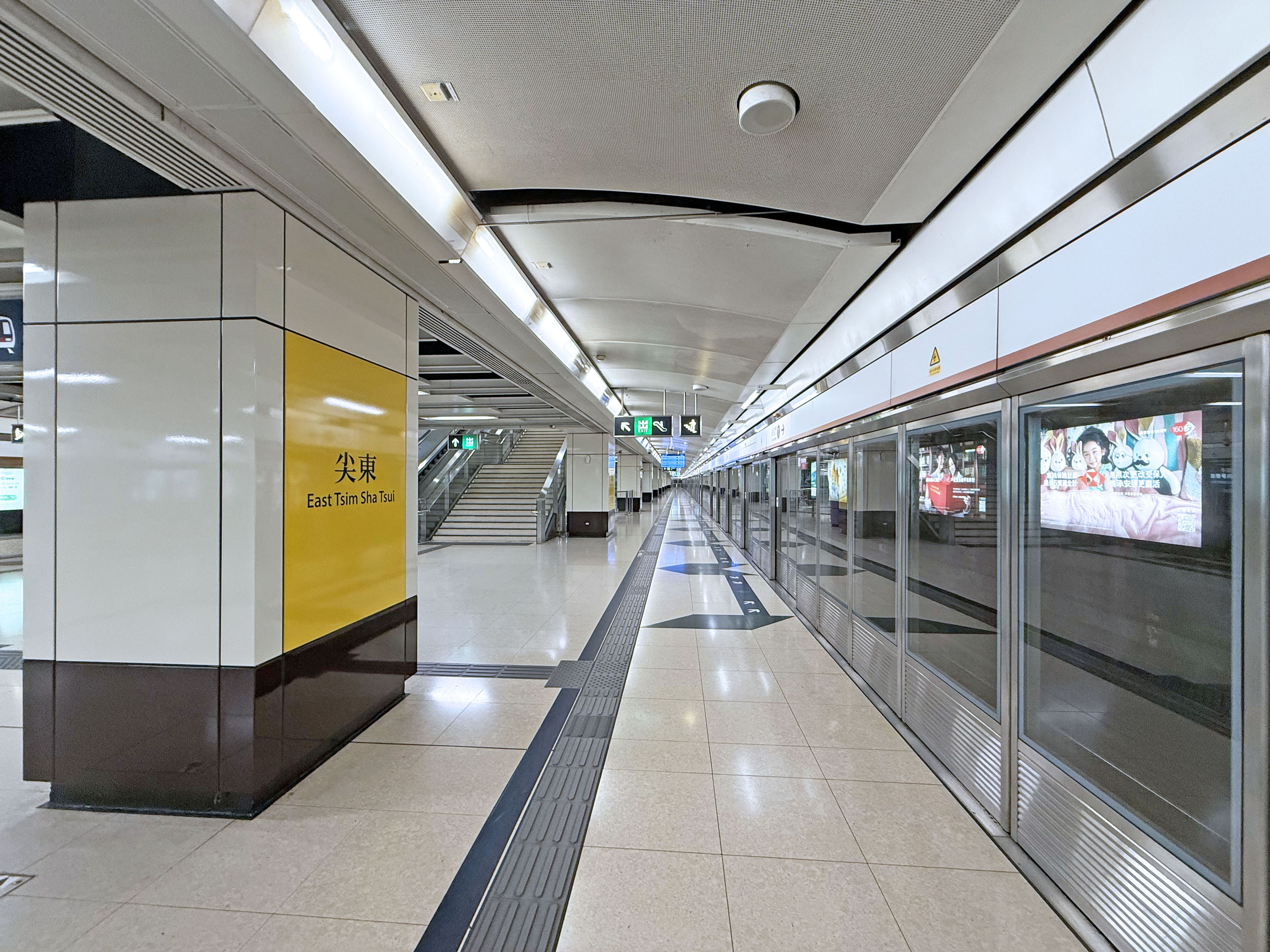
- Platform 1 in November 2025

Chinese name
- Traditional Chinese: 尖東
- Simplified Chinese: 尖东
- Cantonese Yale: Jīmdūng
- Literal meaning: Sharp East
Transcriptions
Standard Mandarin
- Hanyu Pinyin: Jiāndōng
- Wade–Giles: Chien^{1}-tung^{1}
Yue: Cantonese
- Yale Romanization: Jīmdūng
- Jyutping: Zim1dung1

General information
- Location: Salisbury Road, Chatham Road South × Middle Road, Tsim Sha Tsui; Yau Tsim Mong District, Hong Kong
- Coordinates: 22°17′44″N 114°10′31″E
- System: MTR rapid transit station
- Owner: KCR Corporation
- Operator: MTR Corporation
- Line: Tuen Ma line
- Platforms: 2 (1 island platform)
- Tracks: 2
- Connections: Tsim Sha Tsui: (out-of-station interchange); Tsuen Wan line; Bus, minibus; Star Ferry

Construction
- Structure type: Underground
- Accessible: Yes

Other information
- Station code: ETS

History
- Opened: 24 October 2004; 21 years ago

Services
| Preceding station | MTR | Following station |
|---|---|---|
| Austin towards Tuen Mun | Tuen Ma line | Hung Hom towards Wu Kai Sha |
Transfer at Tsim Sha Tsui
| Admiralty towards Central | Tsuen Wan line transfer at Tsim Sha Tsui | Jordan towards Tsuen Wan |

Former services
| Preceding station | MTR | Following station |
|---|---|---|
| Terminus | East Rail line (2004-2009) | Hung Hom towards Lo Wu or Lok Ma Chau |
Track layout
Location
- Location within MTR Location within Hong Kong urban core

East Tsim Sha Tsui (Chinese: 尖東; Cantonese Yale: Jīmdūng) is a station of the Mass Transit Railway (MTR) system of Hong Kong. It is an intermediate station on the Tuen Ma line.

The station was built to alleviate surface traffic congestion, and passenger congestion at Kowloon Tong station.

The station is linked with Tsim Sha Tsui station of the Tsuen Wan line by a network of subways (underground pedestrian tunnels).

== History ==
The predecessor of the East Rail line was the Kowloon–Canton Railway (British Section), which was opened in 1910. At the time of opening, its southern terminus was the old Kowloon station located in Tsim Sha Tsui, where the Clock Tower stands today. However, the old Kowloon station was closed in 1975, and the southern terminus of the railway was relocated to the newly built Hung Hom station.

A station named Mariner featured in the East Kowloon line 1970 scheme, was planned at location where East Tsim Sha Tsui sits today. It was intended to provide interchange to Tsim Sha Tsui of the Kong Kow line (now part of the Tsuen Wan line).

Plans for East Tsim Sha Tsui were subsequently revived in 1993 when the plans for East Kowloon line were modified to become a medium-capacity system as part of an eastern corridor with transfer to the Lantau Airport Railway (now Airport Express and Tung Chung line). The contract to construct East Tsim Sha Tsui was subsequently awarded to a consortium consisting of Hong Kong-based Gammon Construction and Japan-based Nishimatsu.

East Tsim Sha Tsui was opened on 24 October 2004 as a southward extension of the KCR East Rail from Hung Hom, the Tsim Sha Tsui Extension‌, marking the return of the railway to the Tsim Sha Tsui area after 30 years. It served as the southern terminus of the East Rail line until 16 August 2009. As a result of its underground location, the station was equipped with full-height platform screen doors, of the same type used on the KCR West Rail, which opened the year prior. The station was the only one on the East Rail line with these doors for five years, and as a result, the 12-car-long set of screen doors were the longest in the world.

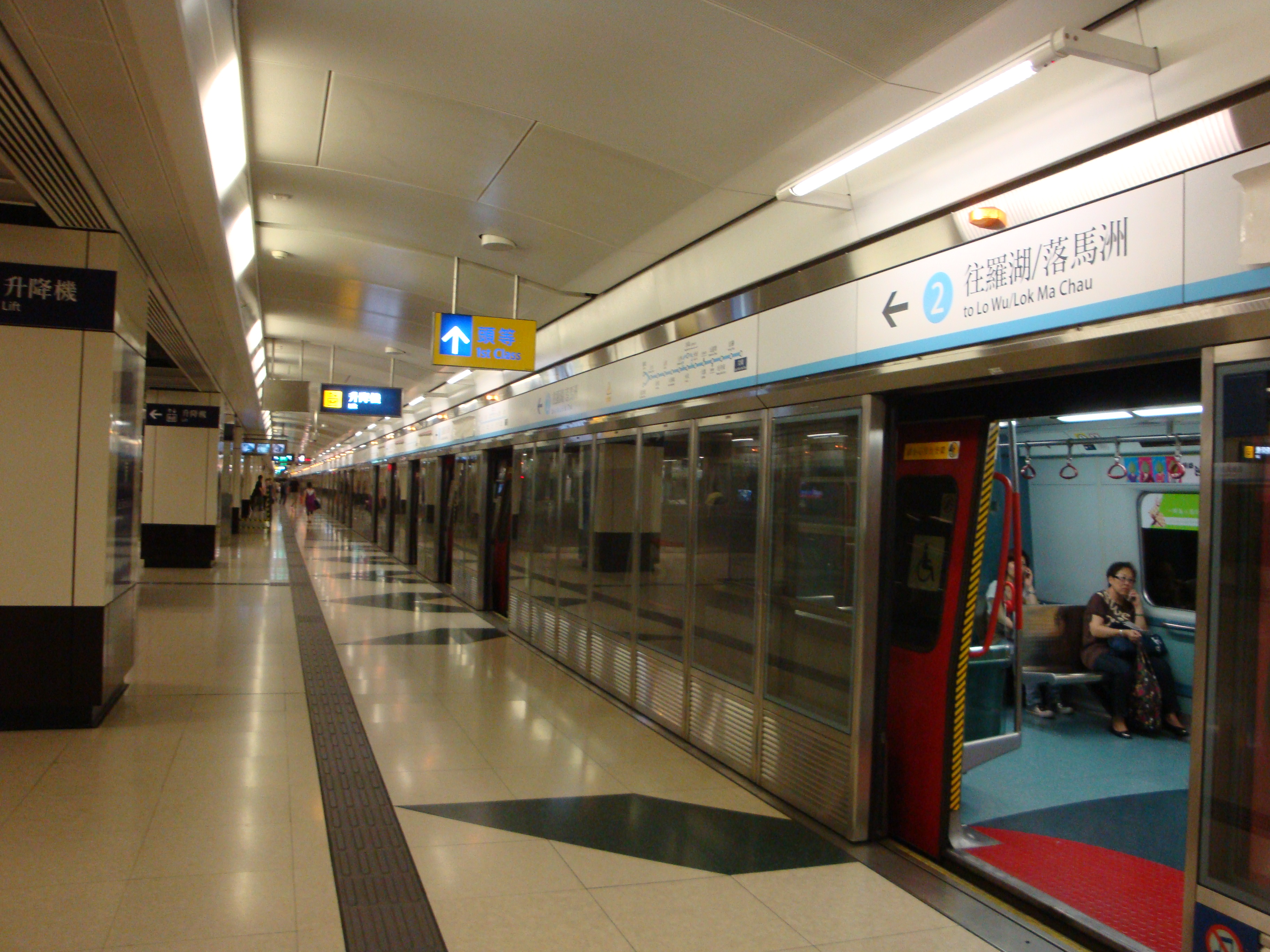
Platform 2 as it appeared in 2009, when the station was still served by the East Rail Line

The status of the East Tsim Sha Tsui station as the southern terminus of the East Rail line was intended to be a temporary arrangement only. Upon the opening of the MTR Kowloon Southern Link on 16 August 2009, the East Rail line terminated in the south at Hung Hom again, and the tracks between Hung Hom and East Tsim Sha Tsui became part of the West Rail line. As a result, Hung Hom became the common southern terminus of the East Rail line and the West Rail line, whilst East Tsim Sha Tsui became an intermediate station on the West Rail line. Due to the shorter length of the trains (8 cars), the ends of the platforms were taken out of use and closed off.

On 27 June 2021, the West Rail line officially merged with the Ma On Shan line (which was already extended into the Tuen Ma line Phase 1 at the time) in East Kowloon to form the new Tuen Ma line, as part of the Shatin to Central link project. Hence, East Tsim Sha Tsui was included in the project and is now an intermediate station on the Tuen Ma line.

== Station layout ==
| PK/PD | Park/ Podium Deck | Middle Road Children's Playground, Tsim Sha Tsui East Waterfront Podium Garden |
| G | Ground | Exits/Entrances, East Tsim Sha Tsui Station Transport interchange, Tsim Sha Tsui East (Mody Road) Transport interchange |
| C/S | Concourse | Customer service centres, washrooms shops, vending machines, ATMs |
| C/S | Subway | Subway to Tsim Sha Tsui (Tsuen Wan line), Middle Road, Peking Road, Kowloon Park Drive, Canton Road; Salisbury Road, Hanoi Road, K11 Art Mall, Nathan Road, Mody Road, Tsim Sha Tsui East |
| P | Platform 1 | Tuen Ma line towards Tuen Mun (Austin) |
| P | Island platform, doors will open on the right |
| P | Platform 2 | Tuen Ma line towards Wu Kai Sha (Hung Hom) |

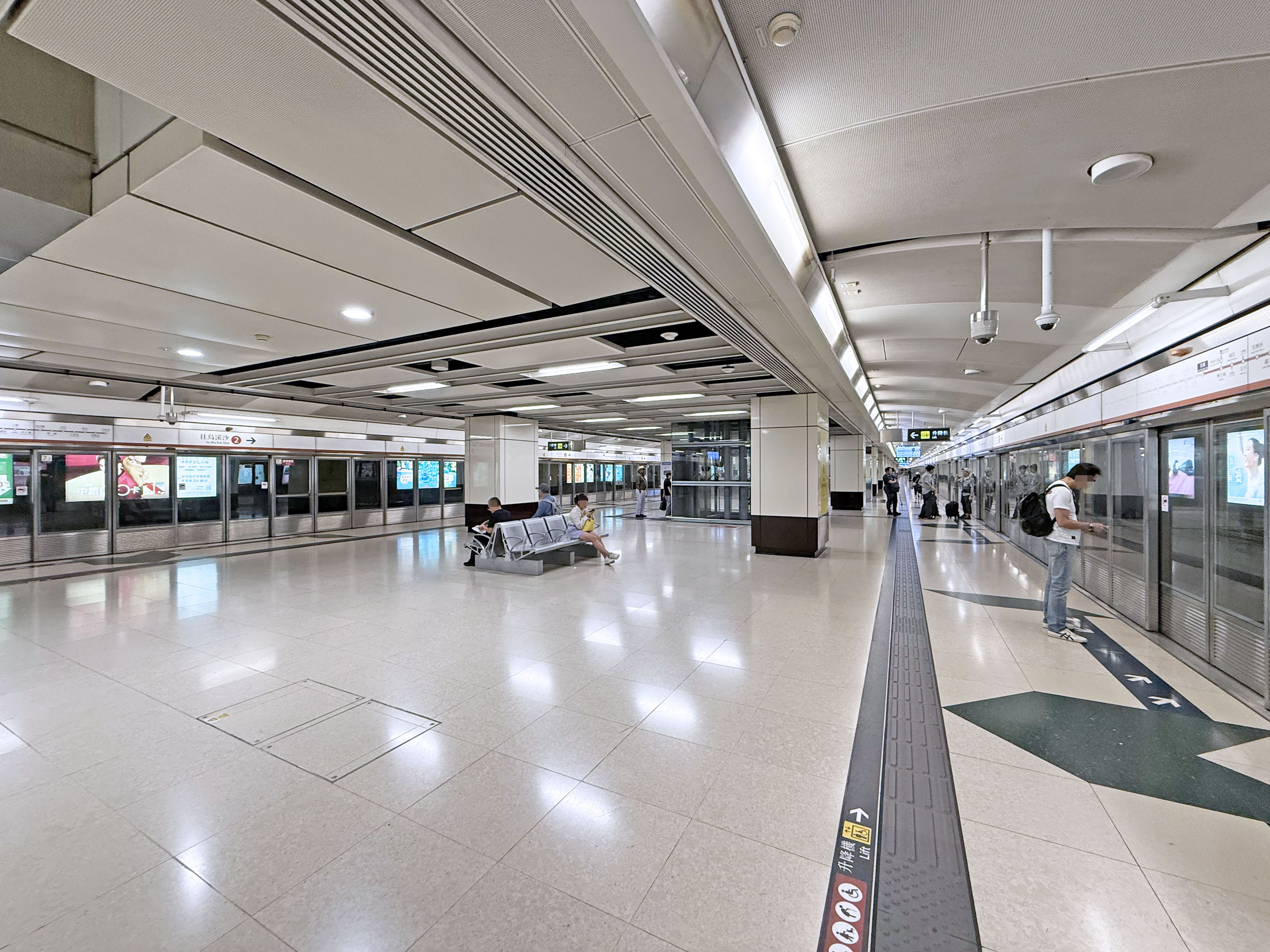
Platforms in July 2025

Passengers heading towards the Tsuen Wan need to leave the paid area of the station and walk through the pedestrian subway under Middle Road or Mody Road to reach Tsim Sha Tsui station at exits L2 and M3, respectively.

Although the stations are connected by a subway, the paid areas for East Tsim Sha Tsui and Tsim Sha Tsui stations are separated. Single journey ticket passengers transferring between the Tuen Ma line and the Tsuen Wan line must purchase two separate tickets as one ticket is captured on exit at either Tsim Sha Tsui or at East Tsim Sha Tsui stations.

By contrast, Octopus card users who transfer between East Tsim Sha Tsui and Tsim Sha Tsui stations within thirty minutes without making any other transport related purchases or more than nine non-transport related purchases in between stations are considered to have taken a single journey and are charged accordingly. Also, MTR City Saver users who transfer between East Tsim Sha Tsui and Tsim Sha Tsui stations within thirty minutes are considered to have taken a single journey and no extra journey will be charged.

== Entrances/exits ==
East Tsim Sha Tsui station is linked with Tsim Sha Tsui station through the Mody Road and Middle Road subways. When both stations' exits are combined, the total number of exits outnumber that of Central. Tsim Sha Tsui station has the exit with the highest letter of all rail stations in Hong Kong, as shown below.

I, M, O, and Q are omitted to prevent misreading as 1, N, 0, and O respectively.

=== In Tsim Sha Tsui station ===
- A1: Kowloon Park, Kowloon Park Sports Centre, Kowloon Park Swimming Pool, China Hong Kong City, Kowloon Masjid and Islamic Centre, Harbour City, Xiqu Centre
- A2: Humphreys Avenue
- B1: Nathan Road, The ONE
- B2: Cameron Road
- C1: Nathan Road
- C2: Peking Road
- D1: Nathan Road
- D2: Carnarvon Road
- D3: K11 Art Mall
- E: Kowloon Hotel
- H: iSQUARE
- R: iSQUARE

=== In East Tsim Sha Tsui station ===
- J: Victoria Dockside, Hong Kong Museum of Art, Hong Kong Space Museum
- K: Middle Road
- L1: Hermes House
- L3: Peninsula Hotel
- L4: Kowloon Hotel
- L5: Peking Road
- L6: Salisbury Road
- N1: Mody Road
- N2: Hanoi Road
- N3: K11 Art Mall
- N4: K11 Art Mall
- N5: Nathan Road
- P1: Wing On Plaza
- P2: Tsim Sha Tsui East
- P3: Chatham Road South

== Gallery ==
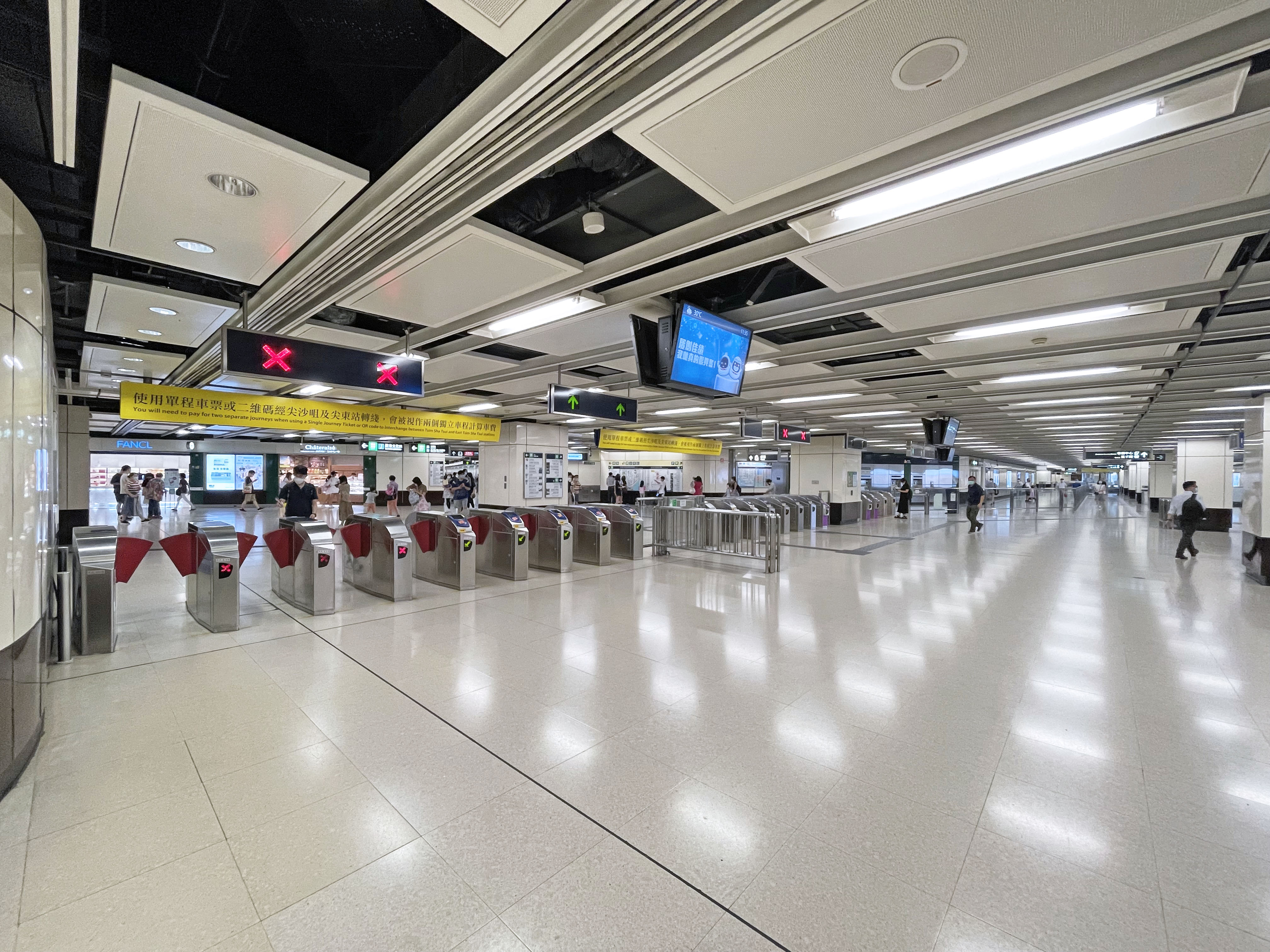
Trunstiles

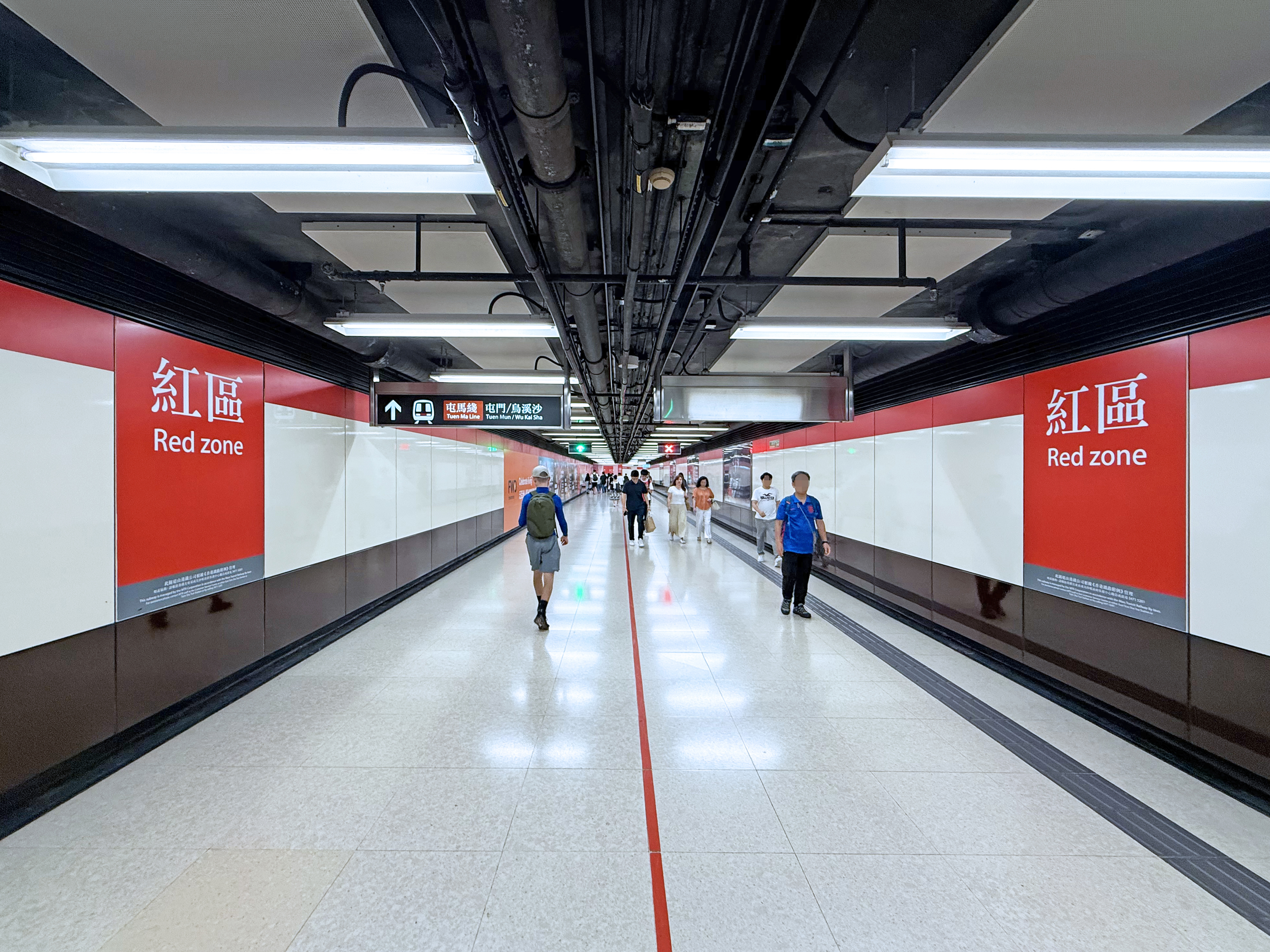
Red zone access

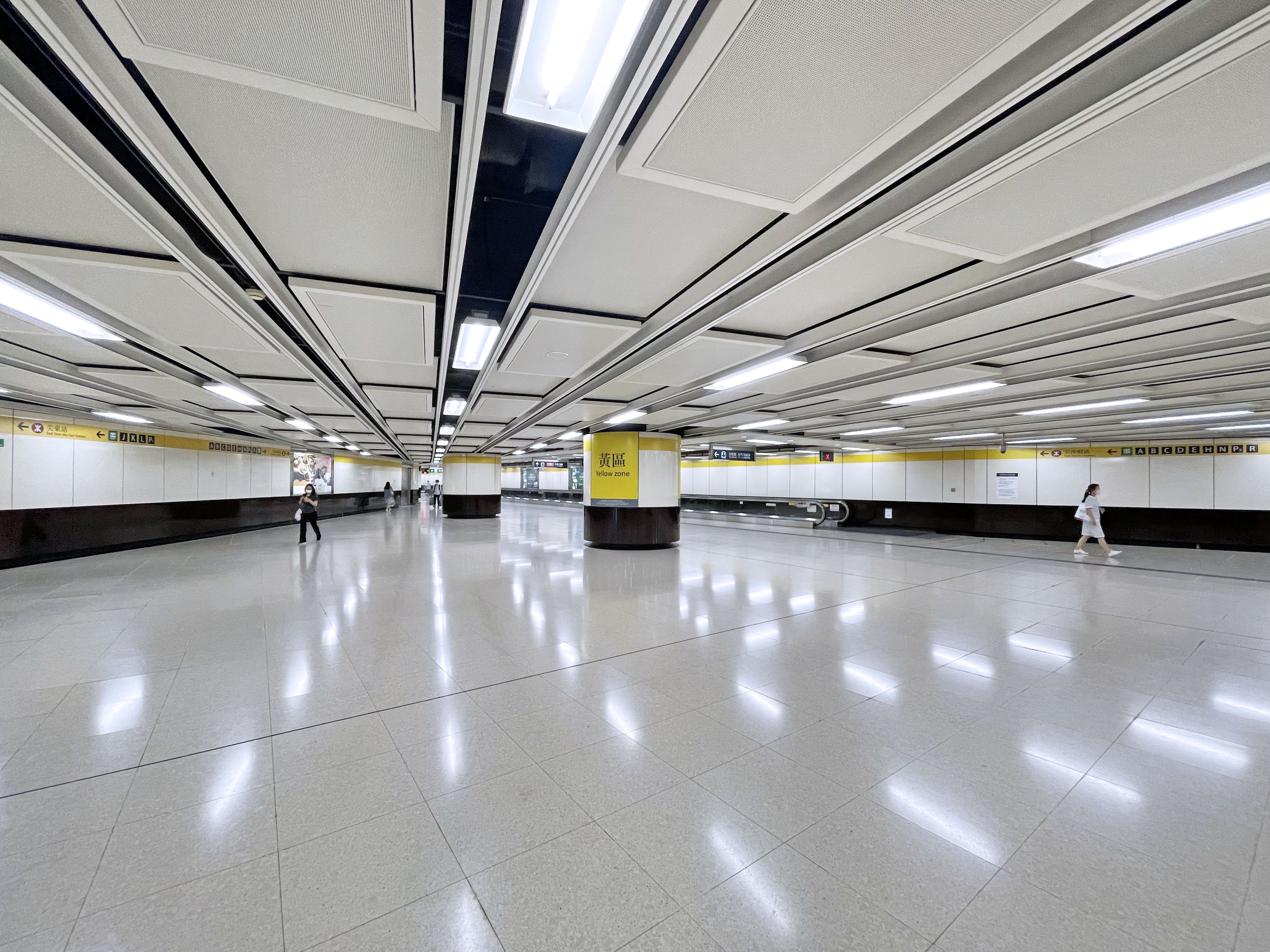
Yellow zone

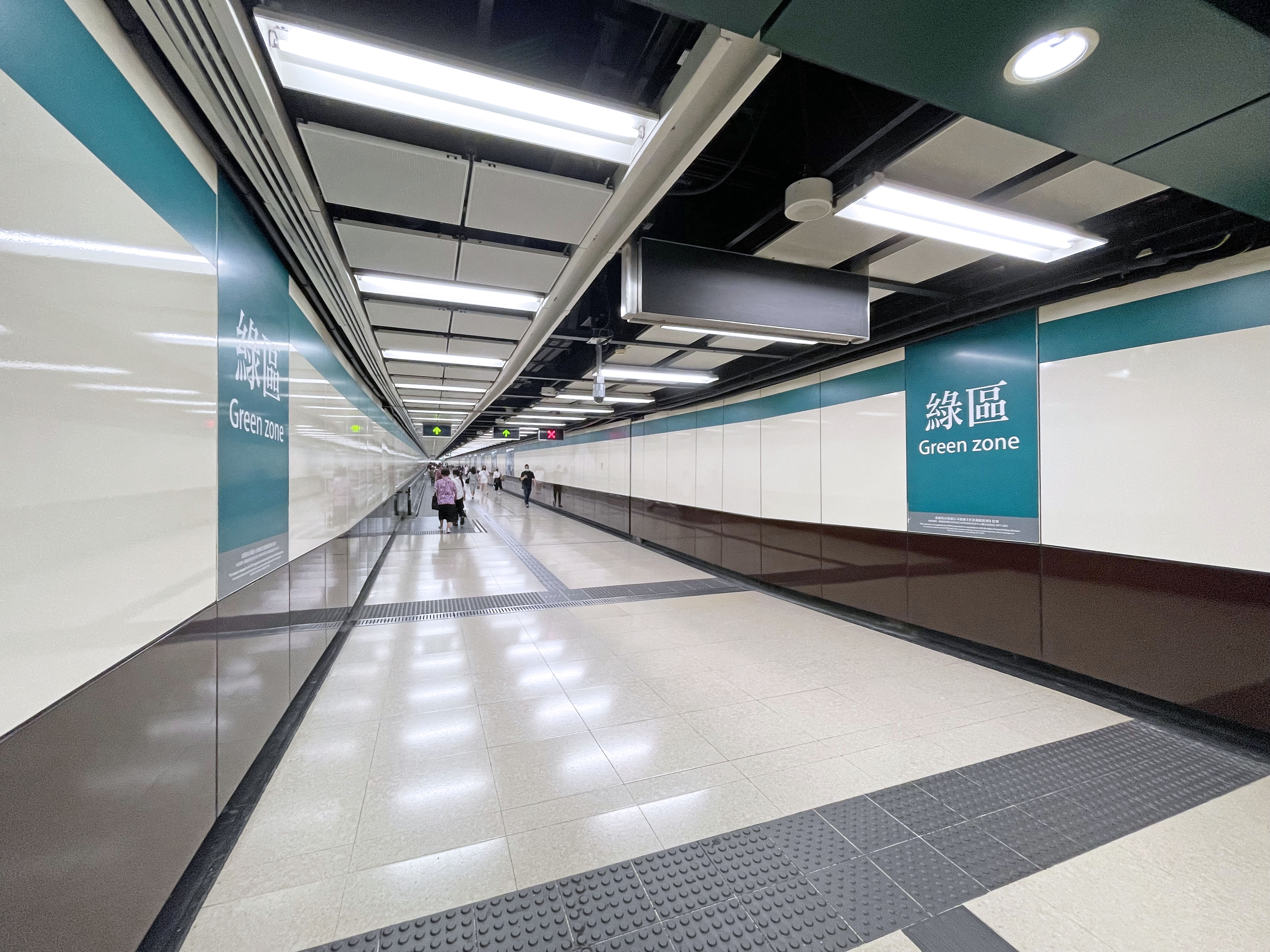
Green zone

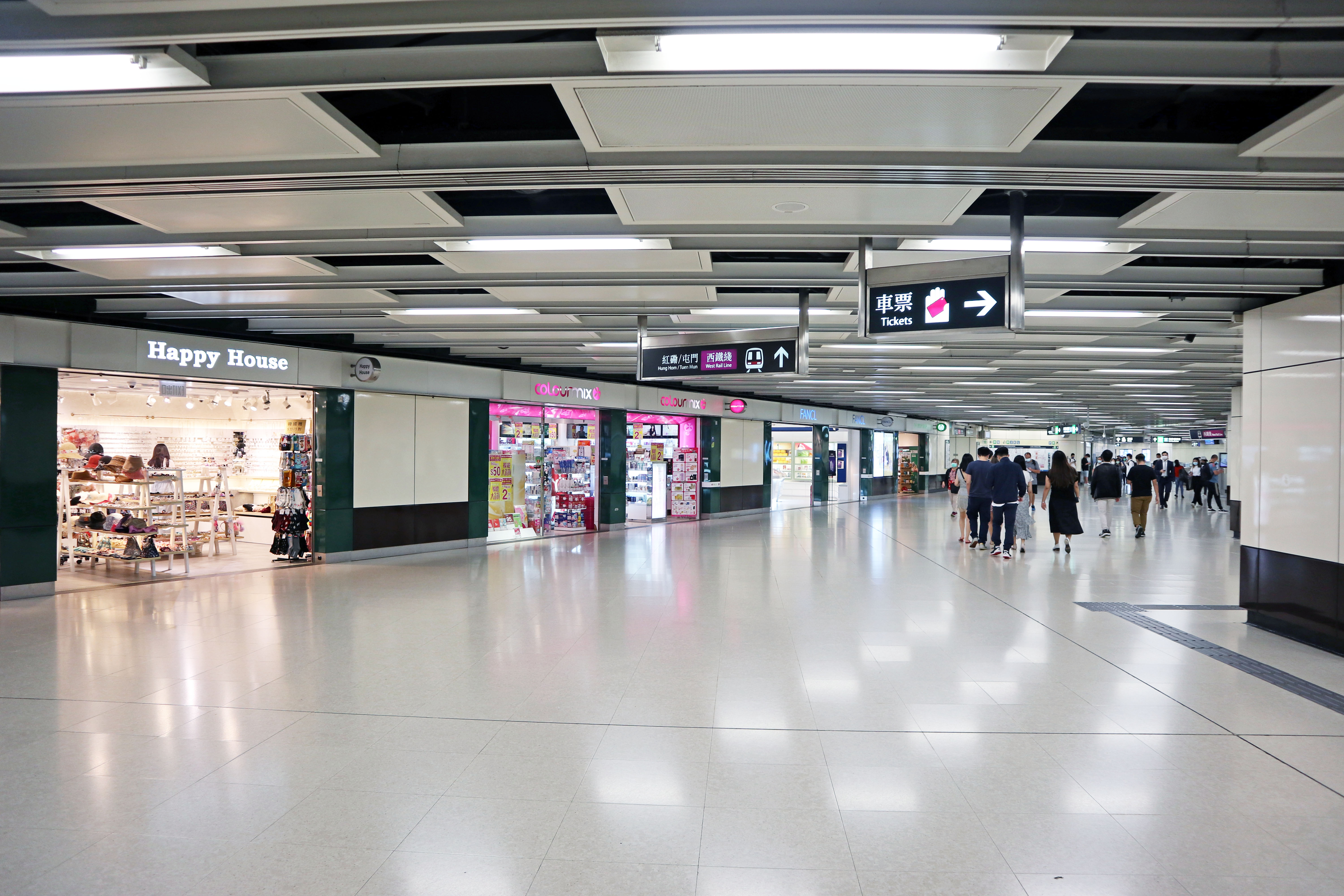
Shops in the green zone
