= Hong Kong Cultural Centre =

Performing arts centre in Hong Kong

Coordinates: 22°17′38″N 114°10′13″E

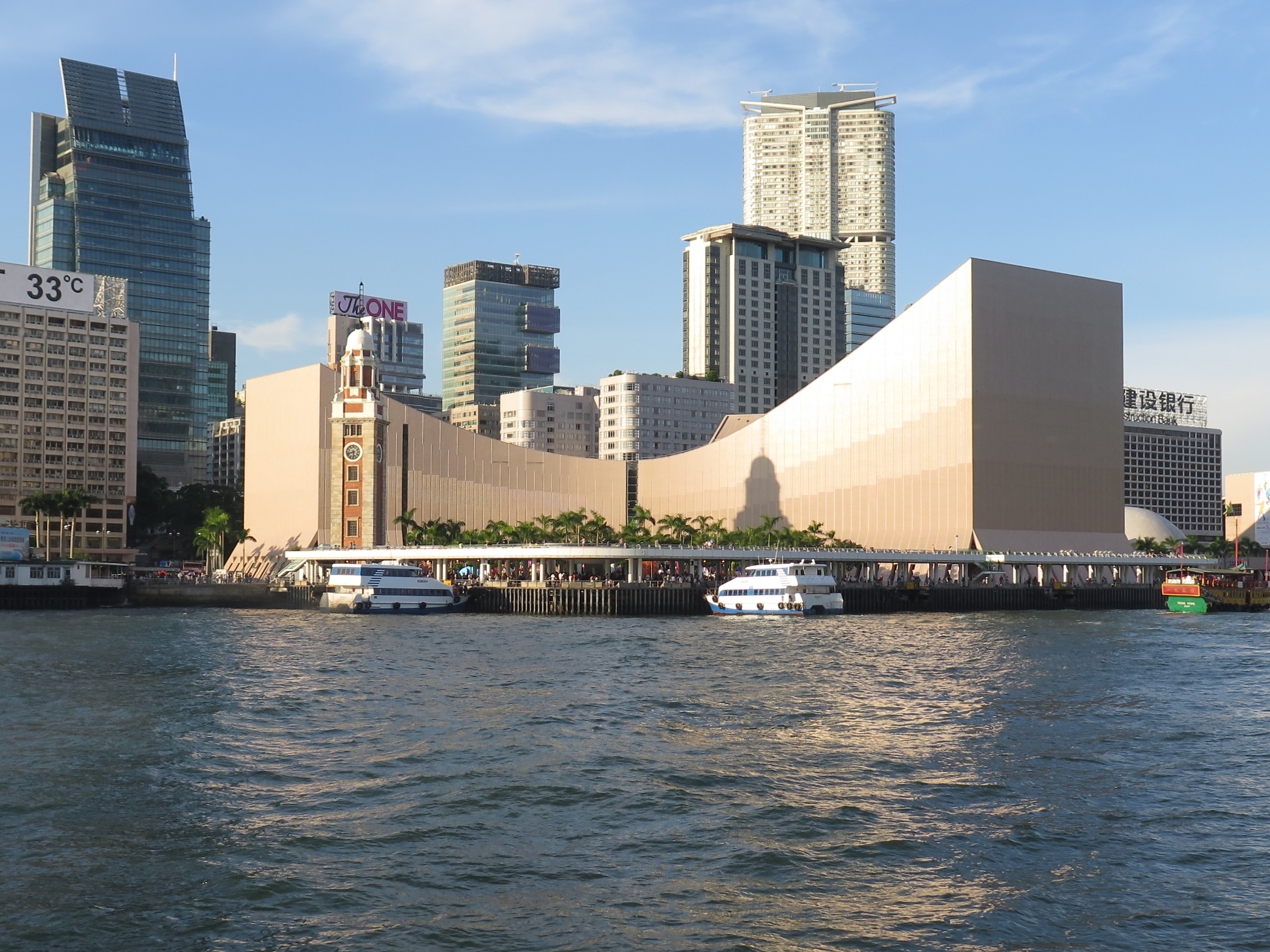
- The centre's exterior in August 2014

- Location within Hong Kong urban core

General information
- Location: 10 Salisbury Road, Tsim Sha Tsui, Kowloon, Hong Kong
- Construction started: 1986; 40 years ago
- Completed: 1989; 37 years ago
- Inaugurated: 8 November 1989; 36 years ago

Design and construction
- Architecture firm: Architectural Services Department

Other information
- Public transit: Tsim Sha Tsui station (Exit E); East Tsim Sha Tsui station (Exits J, L6)

Website
- hkculturalcentre.gov.hk

Hong Kong Cultural Centre
- Chinese: 香港文化中心
Transcriptions
Standard Mandarin
- Hanyu Pinyin: Xiānggǎng Wénhuà Zhōngxīn
Yue: Cantonese
- Jyutping: hoeng1 gong2 man4 faa3 zung1 sam1

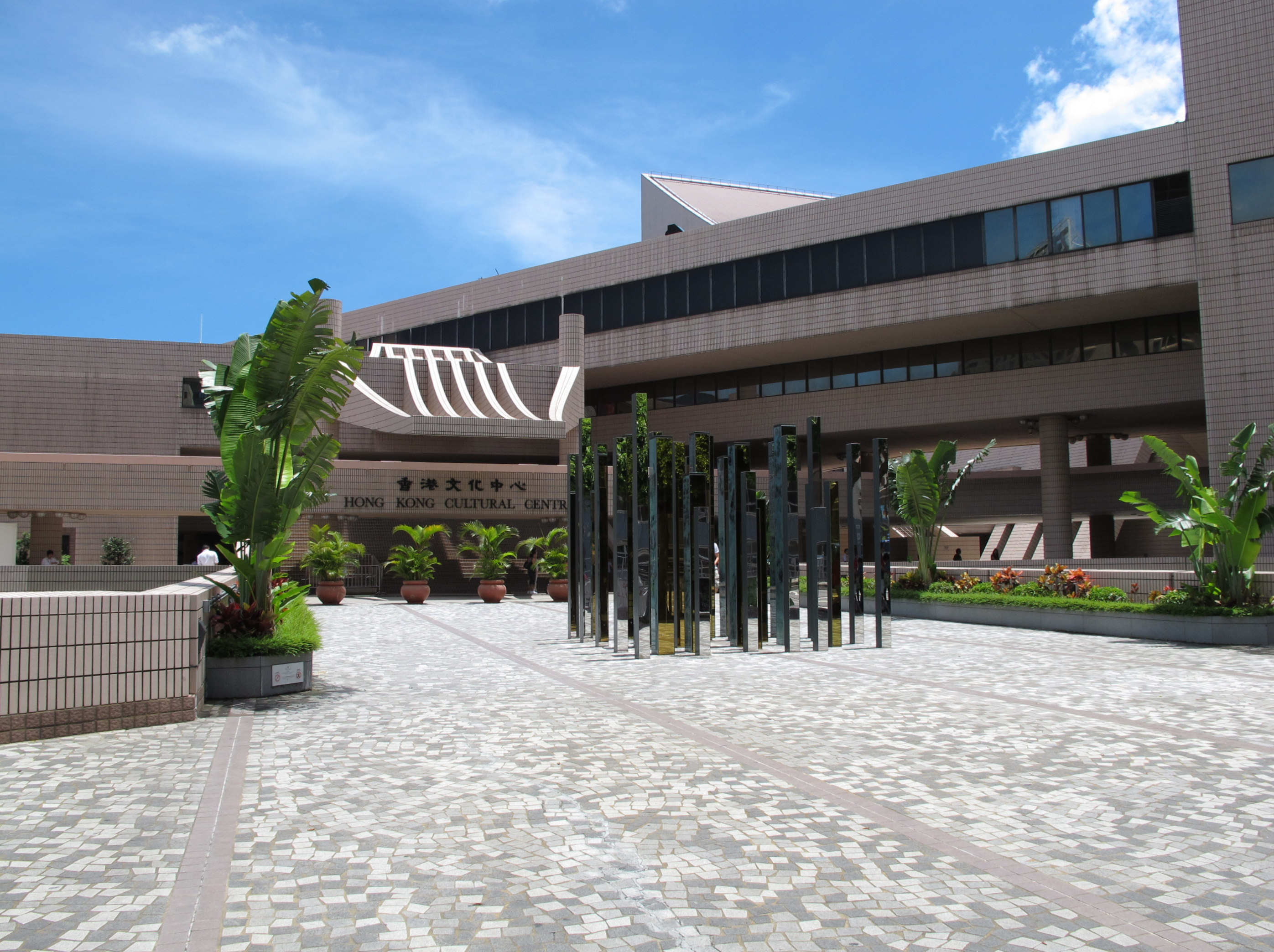
Entrance of the Hong Kong Cultural Centre in July 2010

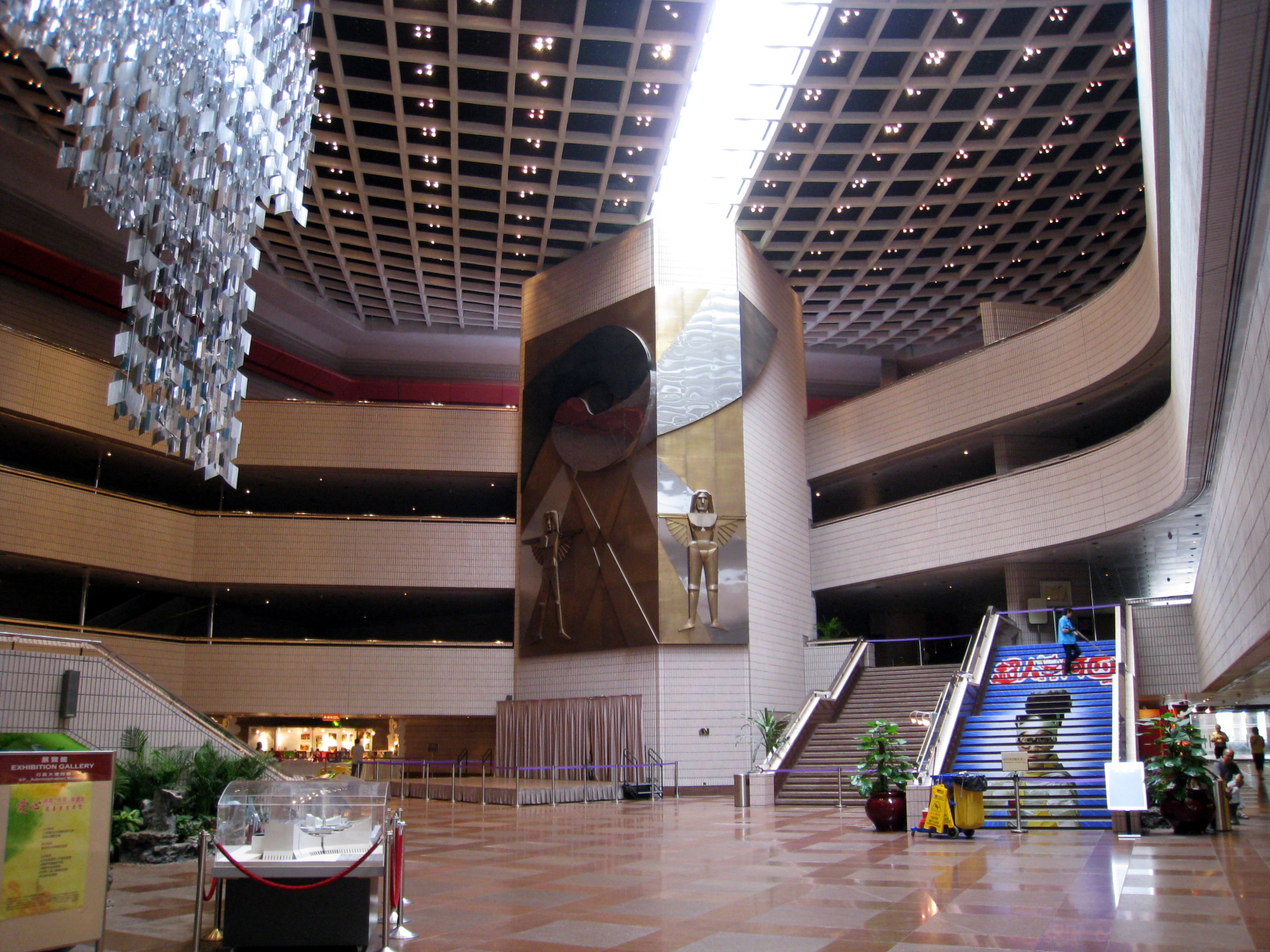
Interior of the Hong Kong Cultural Centre in August 2008

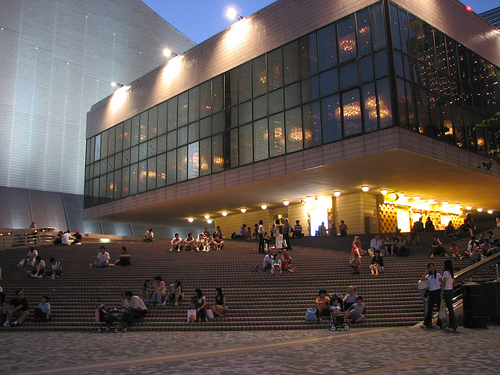
Crowds gathering outside in August 2006

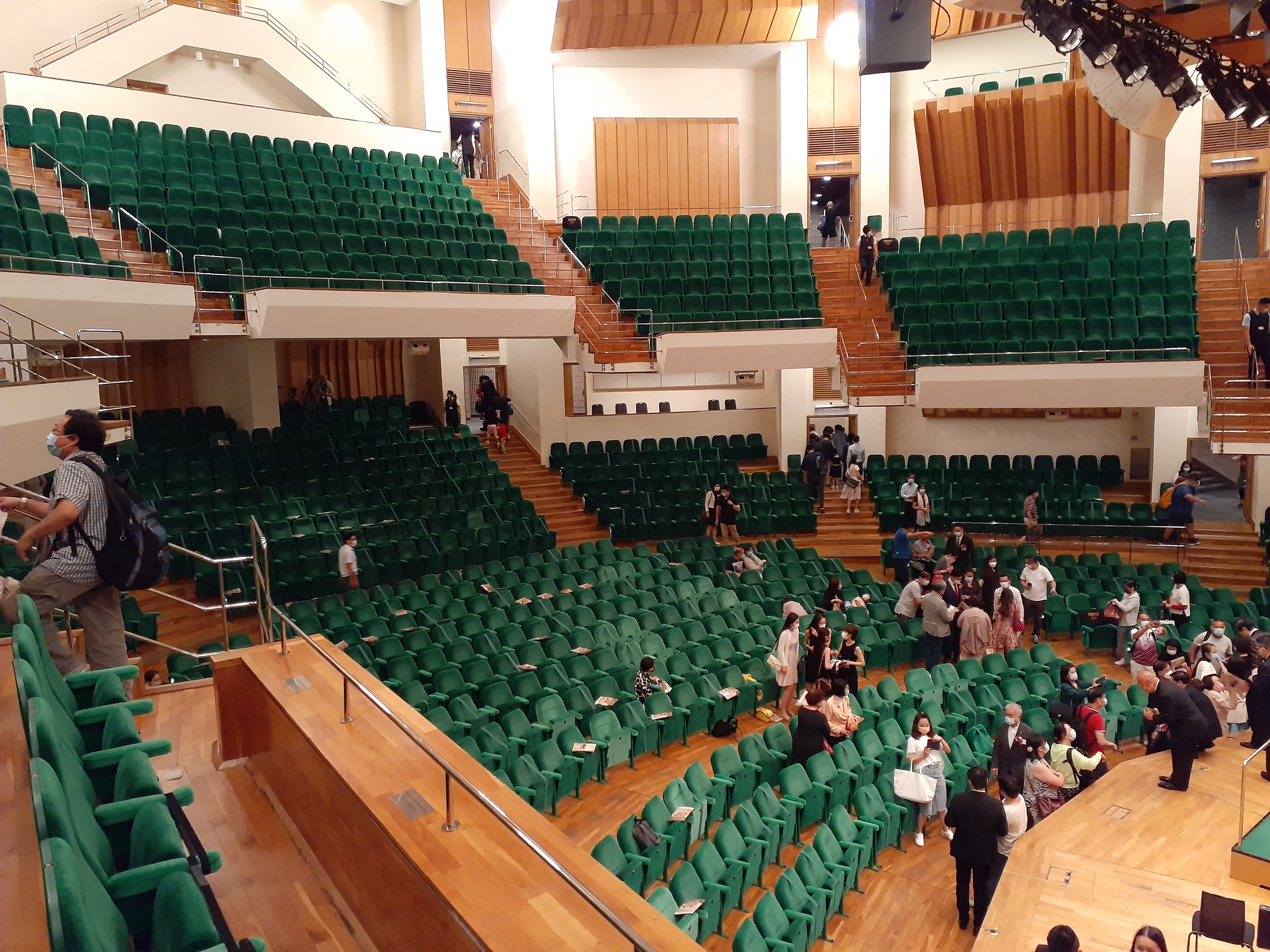
Concert Hall in May 2021

The Hong Kong Cultural Centre (HKCC, Chinese: 香港文化中心) is a public multipurpose performance facility in Tsim Sha Tsui, Hong Kong. Located at Salisbury Road, it was built by the former Urban Council and, since 2000, has been administered by the Leisure and Cultural Services Department of the Hong Kong Government. A wide variety of cultural performances are held here.

== Location ==
The centre is located on the southwestern tip of Tsim Sha Tsui, on the former location of the Kowloon station of the Kowloon–Canton Railway. Adjacent to the centre on the west is the Tsim Sha Tsui Ferry Pier of the Star Ferry, while to the east are the Hong Kong Space Museum and Hong Kong Museum of Art. The historic Clock Tower stands between the centre and the pier.

== History ==
As early as 1970, the Urban Council pressed for construction of a new cultural venue in Kowloon of the same modern standard as the City Hall in Central. The cultural centre project was formally announced in 1974 to be planned on the site of the former Kowloon station. At this time, construction was expected to begin in 1975. However, the project faced financial constraints and was delayed. It was reexamined in 1978 and given top priority by the Urban Council, but cost estimates rose from $190 million to $474 million and the project was again shelved for some time. When construction finally began, the demolition of the historic railway station occupying the site was extremely controversial.

The centre was designed by then-Public Works Department chief architect José Lei. Originally operated by the Urban Council, the venue was officially opened in a ceremony on 8 November 1989 officiated by Charles, Prince of Wales and Princess Diana, who unveiled a commemorative plaque. The $10 million Rieger Orgelbau organ was installed from August to November in 1989 and involved the complicated installation of 8,000 pipes.

The cultural centre opened with the International Celebration of the Arts, a special programme that ran from 5 November to 6 December and showcased Hong Kong musicians, Kunju opera, Cantonese music, and performances by a range of international artists including the Cologne Opera, the Alban Berg Quartett, Sadao Watanabe, and the first Hong Kong appearance of guitarist John Williams.

== Facilities ==
- The Concert Hall, with 2,019 seats, is an oval two-tiered auditorium finished with high quality oak, and includes an adjustable acoustic canopy and curtains. It is the home of the Hong Kong Philharmonic Orchestra. It houses an 8,000-pipe pipe organ, the largest in Asia, built by Austrian firm Rieger Orgelbau. It has been recorded by Christopher Herrick on Organ Fireworks VIII.
- The Grand Theatre, with 1,734 seats in three tiers, was designed for large scale opera, ballet, and musicals. The annual Hong Kong Film Awards presentation ceremony has been held at the theatre since 1991.
- The Studio Theatre, with 300 to 496 seats depending upon the set-up, can accommodate smaller-scale theatre and performance works.
- Exhibition Gallery
- 4 foyer exhibition areas.
- 11 rehearsal and practice rooms.

== Transport ==
The centre is adjacent to the Star Ferry Pier and the Star Ferry bus terminus served by Kowloon Motor Bus.

It is also within walking distance to Tsim Sha Tsui station and East Tsim Sha Tsui station, which serve the Tsuen Wan line and Tuen Ma line respectively.

== See also ==
- List of concert halls
- Music of Hong Kong
