= Tsim Sha Tsui station =

MTR station in Kowloon, Hong Kong

Tsim Sha Tsui 尖沙咀
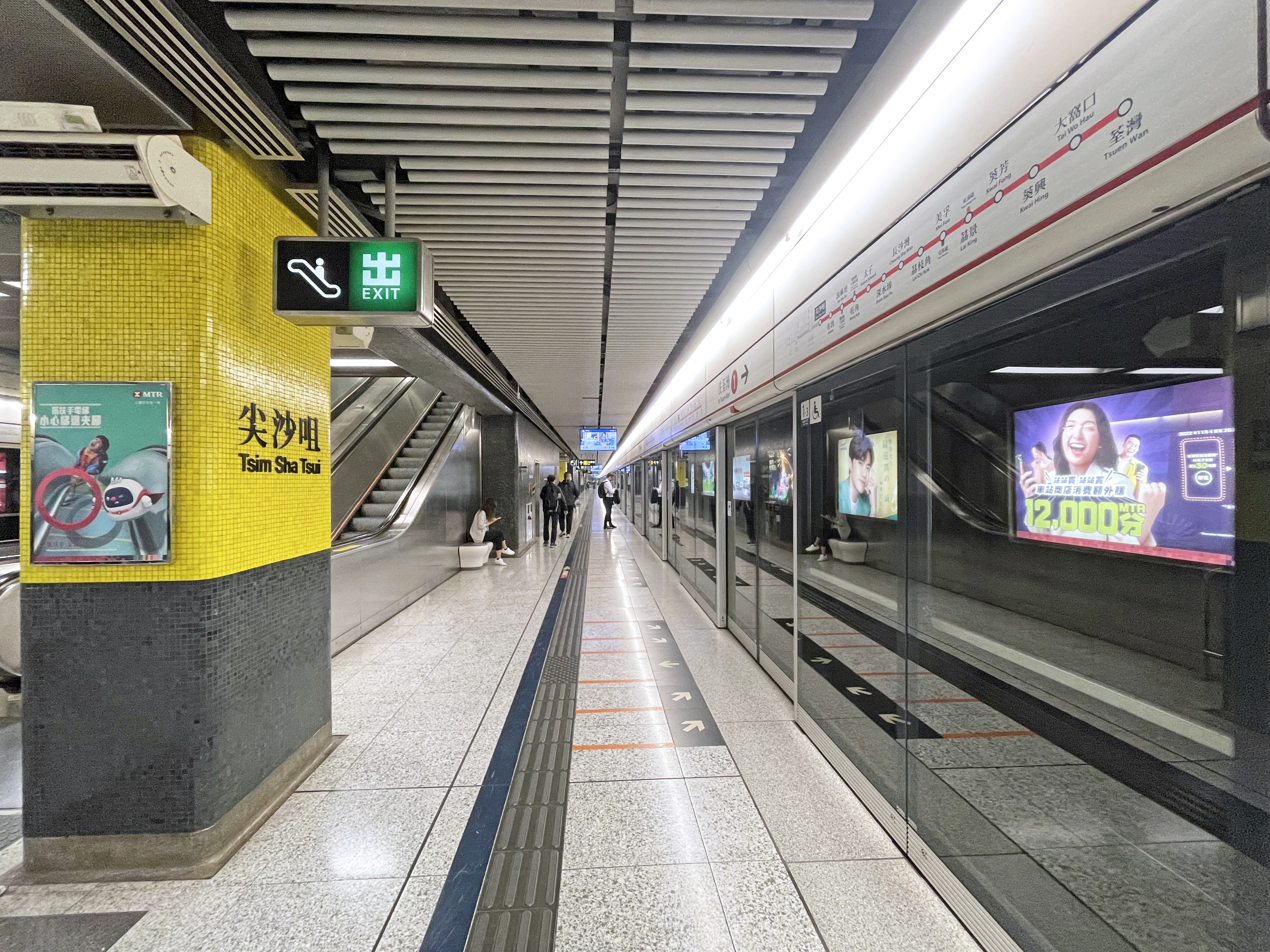
- Tsim Sha Tsui station platforms in December 2022

Chinese name
- Chinese: 尖沙咀
- Cantonese Yale: Jīmsājéui
- Literal meaning: Sandmouth Point
Transcriptions
Standard Mandarin
- Hanyu Pinyin: Jiānshāzuǐ
Yue: Cantonese
- Yale Romanization: Jīmsājéui
- Jyutping: Zim1saa1zeoi2

General information
- Location: Nathan Road; Tsim Sha Tsui, Hong Kong; China
- Coordinates: 22°17′50″N 114°10′20″E
- System: MTR rapid transit station
- Operator: MTR Corporation
- Line: Tsuen Wan line
- Platforms: 2 (1 island platform)
- Tracks: 2
- Connections: East Tsim Sha Tsui: (out-of-station interchange); Tuen Ma line; Bus, minibus; Star Ferry

Construction
- Structure type: Underground
- Platform levels: 1
- Accessible: Yes

Other information
- Station code: TST

History
- Opened: Tsuen Wan line :16 December 1979; 46 years ago

Services
| Preceding station | MTR | Following station |
|---|---|---|
| Admiralty towards Central | Tsuen Wan line | Jordan towards Tsuen Wan |
Transfer at East Tsim Sha Tsui
| Austin towards Tuen Mun | Tuen Ma line | Hung Hom towards Wu Kai Sha |
Route map
Location
- Location within MTR Location within Hong Kong urban core

Tsim Sha Tsui is an MTR station on the Tsuen Wan line. The station, originally opened on 16 December 1979 on the Tsuen Wan line, serves the area of Tsim Sha Tsui.

East Tsim Sha Tsui station on the Tuen Ma line, which opened on 24 October 2004, is connected to this station by underground pedestrian passages. The two stations serve as an interchange point between the Tsuen Wan and Tuen Ma lines.

== History ==
The station was built underneath Nathan Road in the late 1970s. The site of Exit A1 was once the vehicular entrance to Kowloon Park, which was relocated to Haiphong Road. The contracts for the construction of this station, along with Jordan station and tunnels, were awarded to Nishimastu Construction. The station opened on 16 December 1979 as part of the Kwun Tong line. Service was extended southward, across the harbour, on 12 February 1980. Before the Tsuen Wan Extension opened, the single line of the MTR traveled from Central to Kwun Tong (whereas today all northbound trains from Tsim Sha Tsui go to Tsuen Wan). The station concourse was renovated in 1986.

Tsim Sha Tsui station was featured in Clifton Ko's 1987 film, It's a Mad, Mad, Mad World. It also appeared in the 1988 film Police Story 2, The station appeared while a spy followed a terrorist. The film also showed the station’s interior. It also appeared in a brief chase sequence featuring Brigitte Lin in Wong Kar-wai's 1994 film, Chungking Express.

Modification work were undertaken from 2002 to 2005 to facilitate new pedestrian subway connections between this station and the new East Tsim Sha Tsui station, built nearby by the KCR Corporation. The contractor was Kumagai Gumi. The work involved reconfiguration of the concourse and various station upgrades.

Exit A1 was rebuilt from 2014 to 2016 to provide a new lift and enlarge the access. During construction a temporary exit was provided. The permanent exit reopened on 7 May 2016 with a "crystal cube" design, replacing the old concrete structure, that houses the lift, two escalators, and stairs.

In December 2013, construction began on a redesigned Exit D. A new passage was built to connect to the K11 shopping centre, aiming to relieve congestion in the southern end of the station concourse as well as the Mody Road Subway. The new passageway opened on 30 November 2018.

On 10 February 2017, a Tsuen Wan-bound train was the site of an arson attack in which 19 people were injured. A 60-year-old man suffering from mental illness shouted, "My son was killed. I shall burn with you all," and set himself ablaze in the packed train. He had a son from his first marriage, who had died in an incident. The train operator drove the train to Tsim Sha Tsui for evacuation. The station was closed after the incident and was reopened next morning. The suspect died from organ failure three months later and was the only casualty.

== Station layout ==
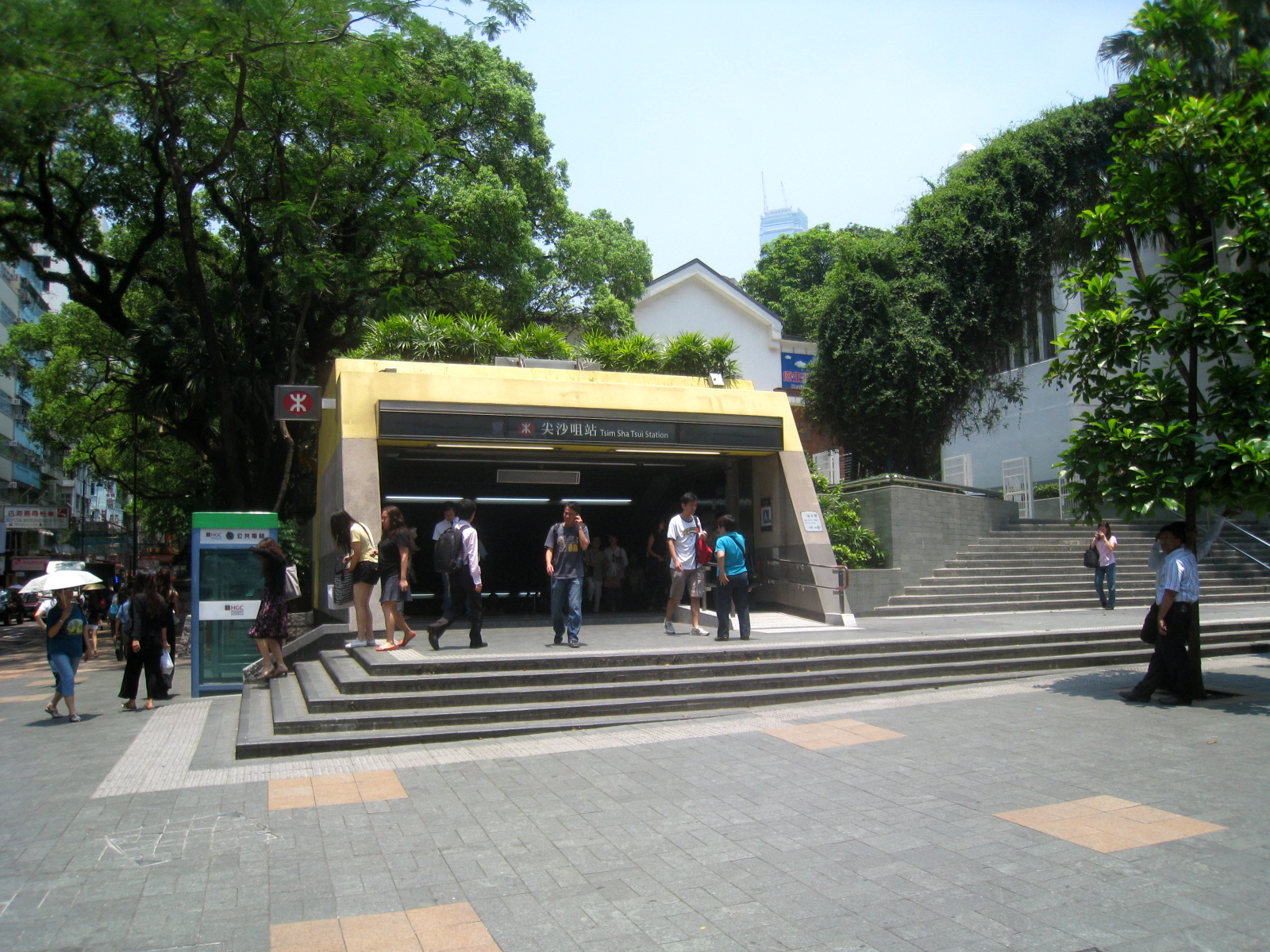
Before (July 2009)

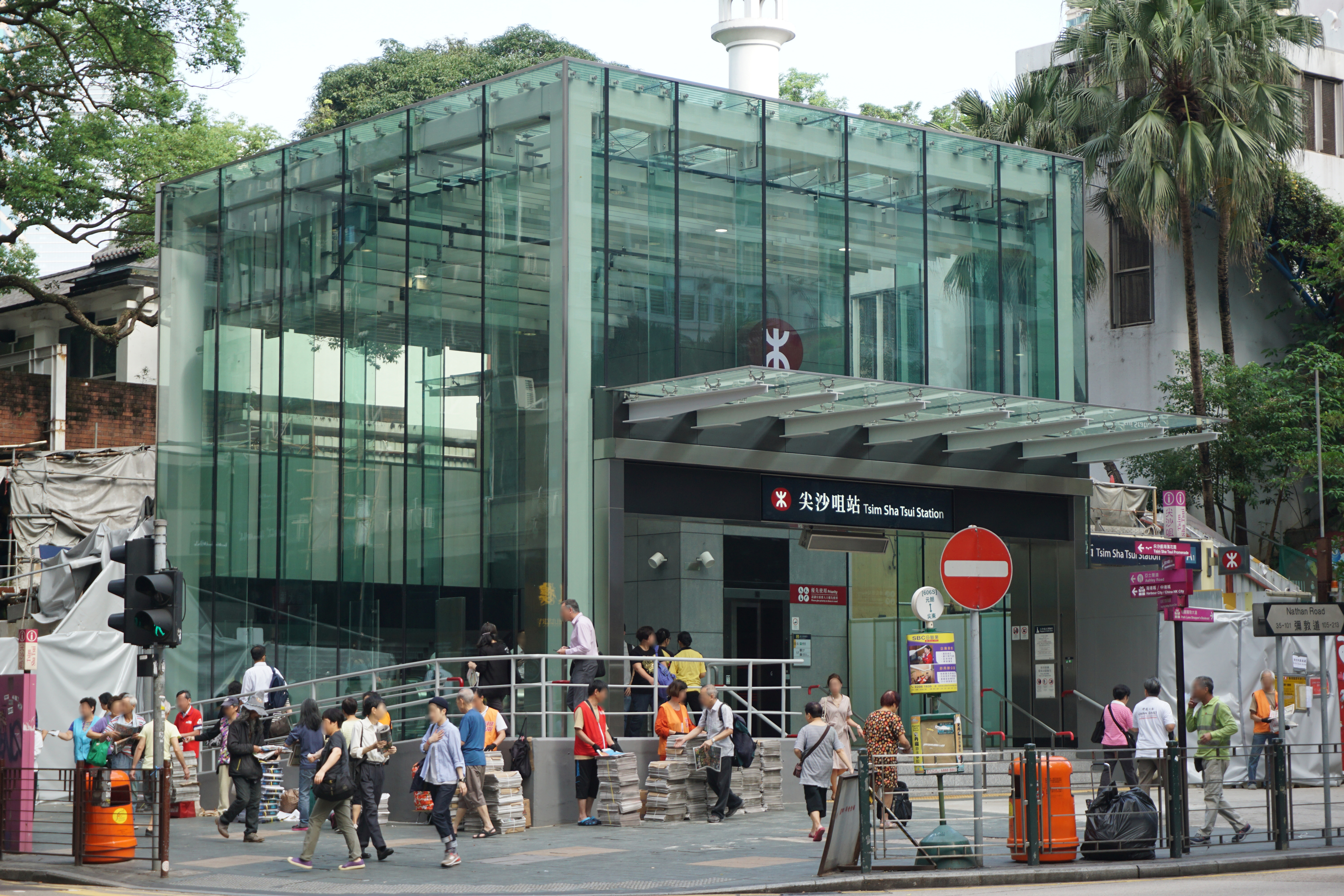
After (May 2016)

Exit A reconstruction

Platforms 1 and 2 share the same island platform. Out-of-system access to the Tuen Ma line is provided at the concourse through exits F or G and a walk along the Middle Road or Mody Road subway system respectively to reach East Tsim Sha Tsui station.

| G | Ground level | Exits/Entrances |
| L1 | Concourse | Customer service center, shops, vending machines, ATMs, Octopus promotion machine |
| L1 | Passages | Passages to East Tsim Sha Tsui ( Tuen Ma line) |
| L2 | Platform 1 | Tsuen Wan line towards Tsuen Wan (Jordan)→ |
| L2 | Island platform, doors will open on the right |
| L2 | Platform 2 | ← Tsuen Wan line towards Central (Admiralty) |

Although Tsim Sha Tsui station and East Tsim Sha Tsui station are connected, the fare gates of these two station are separated. Single journey ticket passengers transferring from Tsuen Wan line to Tuen Ma line must purchase a second ticket at East Tsim Sha Tsui station as the first ticket is withdrawn, without refunding the remaining value in the ticket, once the passengers exit through the turnstiles at Tsim Sha Tsui station. In contrast, Octopus card users who transfer between Tsim Sha Tsui and East Tsim Sha Tsui stations within thirty minutes without making any other transport-related purchases or more than nine non-transport related purchases in between stations are considered to have taken a single journey and are charged accordingly. Also, MTR City Saver users who transfer between East Tsim Sha Tsui and Tsim Sha Tsui stations within thirty minutes are considered to have taken a single journey and no extra journey will be charged.

== Entrances/exits ==
Tsim Sha Tsui station is linked with East Tsim Sha Tsui station through the Mody Road and Middle Road subways. Though the stations are independent from one another, they share a common exit naming scheme to avoid confusion.

Exits I, M, O, and Q are omitted to prevent misreading as 1, N, 0, and O respectively.

=== In Tsim Sha Tsui station ===
- A1: Kowloon Park, Kowloon Park Sports Centre, Kowloon Park Swimming Pool, China Hong Kong City, Kowloon Masjid and Islamic Centre, Harbour City, Xiqu Centre
- A2: Humphreys Avenue
- B1: Nathan Road, The ONE
- B2: Cameron Road
- C1: Nathan Road
- C2: Peking Road
- D1: Nathan Road
- D2: Carnarvon Road
- D3: K11 Art Mall
- E: Kowloon Hotel
- H: iSQUARE
- R: iSQUARE

=== In East Tsim Sha Tsui station ===
- J: Victoria Dockside, Hong Kong Museum of Art, Hong Kong Space Museum
- K: Middle Road
- L1: Hermes House
- L3: Peninsula Hotel
- L4: Kowloon Hotel
- L5: Peking Road
- L6: Salisbury Road, Hong Kong Cultural Centre
- N1: Mody Road
- N2: Hanoi Road
- N3: K11 Art Mall
- N4: K11 Art Mall
- N5: Nathan Road
- P1: Wing On Plaza
- P2: Tsim Sha Tsui East
- P3: Chatham Road South

== Gallery ==
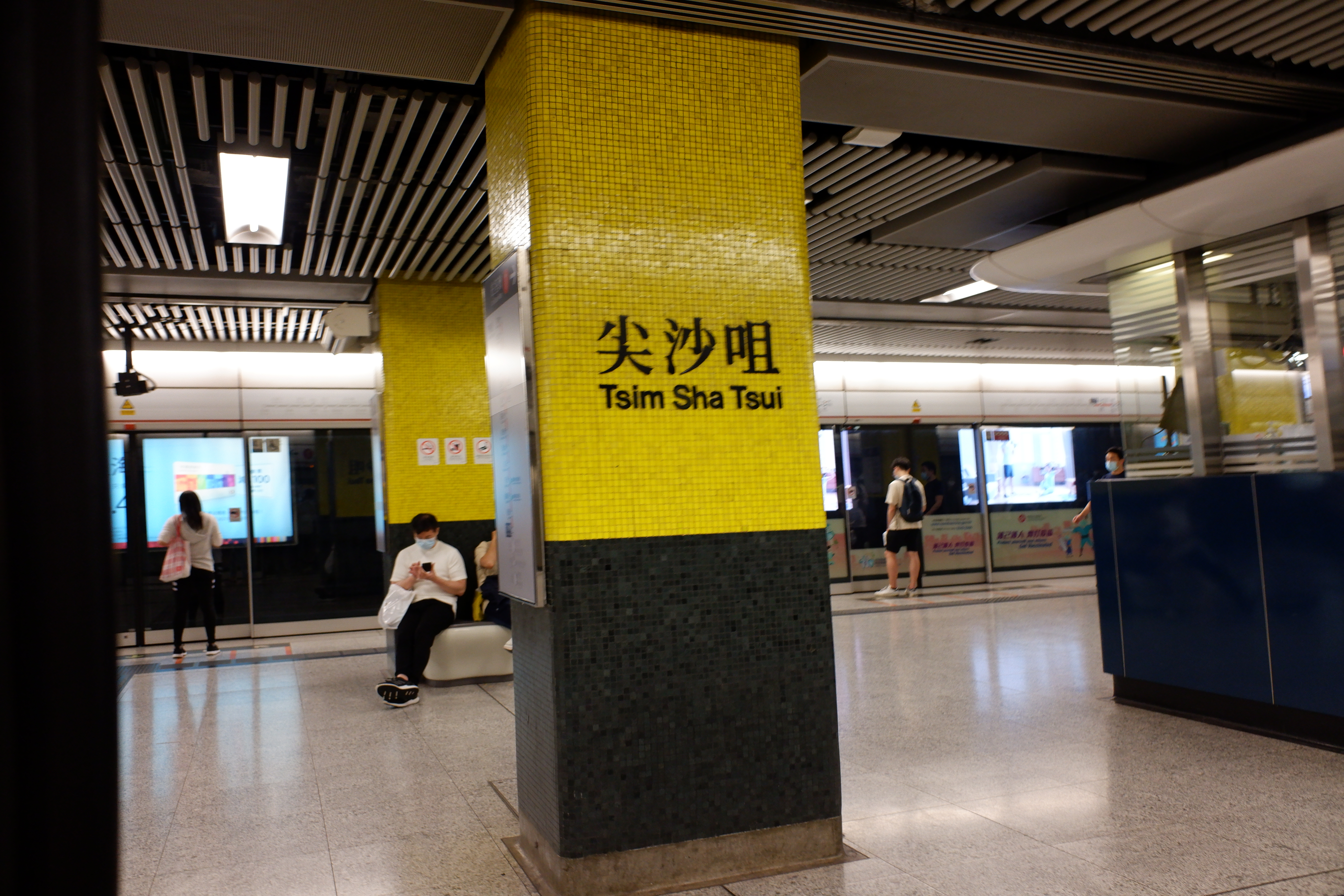
Platform

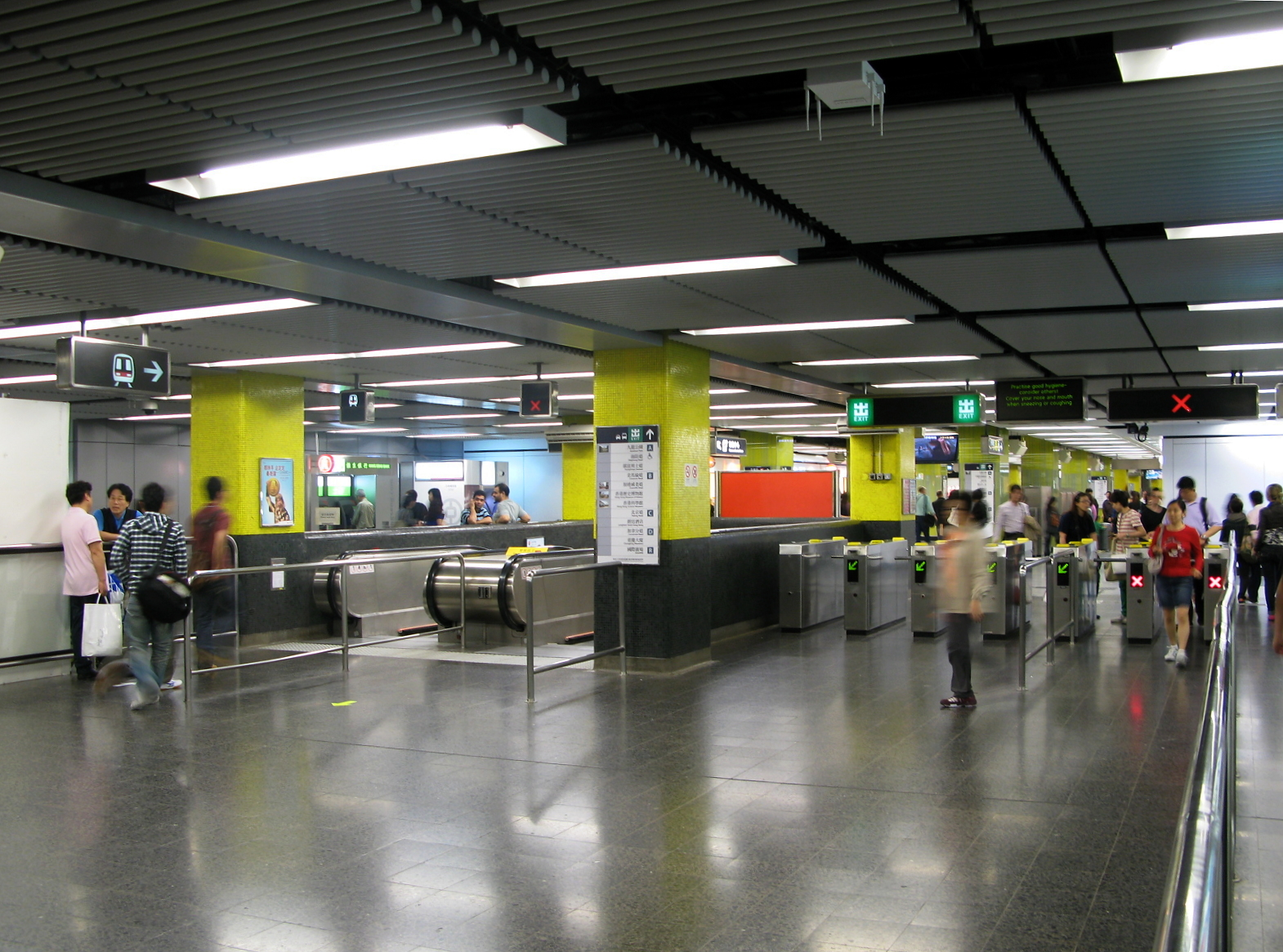
Concourse of Tsim Sha Tsui station in February 2010
