= One Peking Road =

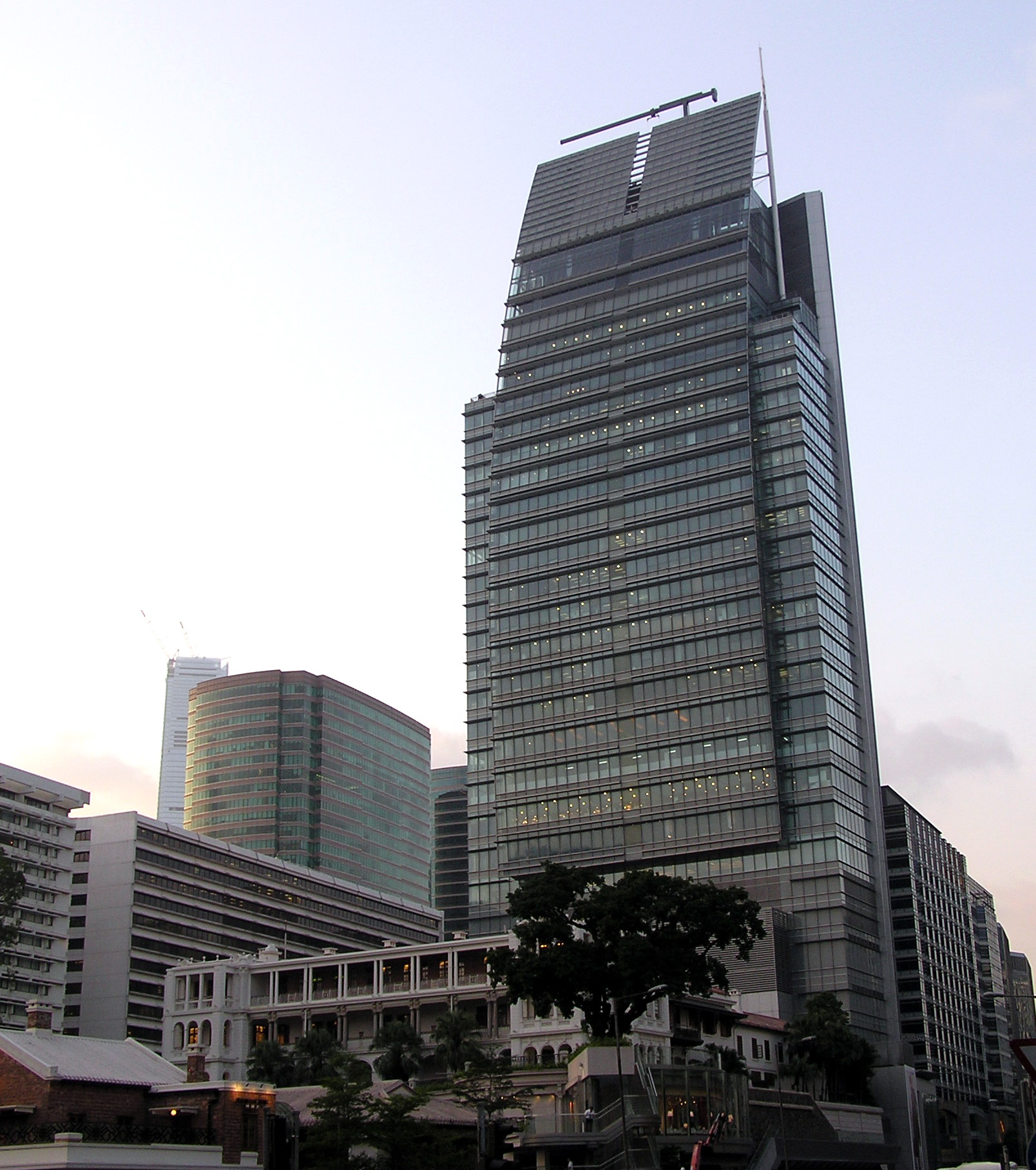
- One Peking Road
- Interactive map of the One Peking Road area

General information
- Status: Completed
- Type: shopping mall, office building
- Location: 1 Peking Road, Tsim Sha Tsui, Kowloon, Hong Kong
- Coordinates: 22.2964°N 114.1708°E
- Construction started: 2000; 26 years ago
- Opening: 2003; 23 years ago

Technical details
- Floor count: 30
- Floor area: 23,680 sq.ft.

Design and construction
- Architect: Rocco Design Architects
- Developer: Glorious Sun Group
- Main contractor: Gammon Construction

One Peking Road
- Traditional Chinese: 北京道1號
- Simplified Chinese: 北京道1号
Transcriptions
Standard Mandarin
- Hanyu Pinyin: Běijīng Dào 1 Hào
Yue: Cantonese
- Jyutping: bak1 ging1 dou6 1 hou6

One Peking Road is a prominent 30-floor office building in Peking Road, Tsim Sha Tsui, Kowloon, Hong Kong. The One Peking Road sits on the site of the former Tsim Sha Tsui Market and a row of three-story walk up buildings next to it, which were demolished in 1999.

== History ==
The developer for the project was Glorious Sun Group who paid HK$1.24 billion for the Market and walk up buildings site at a government auction in April 1998. The skyscraper, which was designed by Rocco Design Architects, was built by Gammon Construction and completed in 2003. It features shops, restaurants and office space. The building was awarded the HKIA Medal of the Year in 2003.
