= Rocco Design Architects =

Rocco Design Architects Associates Limited

Practice information
- Key architects: Rocco S. K. Yim
- Founded: 1982; 43 years ago
- Location: Hong Kong

Significant works and honors
- Buildings: Hong Kong station, Citibank Plaza, Guangdong Museum.
- Projects: West Kowloon Cultural District (in selection process)

Rocco Design Architects Associates Limited
- Traditional Chinese: 嚴迅奇建築師事務有限公司
- Simplified Chinese: 严迅奇建筑师事务有限公司
Transcriptions
Standard Mandarin
- Hanyu Pinyin: Yán Xùnqí Jiànzhùshī Shìwù Yǒuxiàngōngsī
Yue: Cantonese
- Jyutping: jim4 seon3 kei4 gin3 zuk1 si1 si6 mou6 jau5 haan6 gung1 si1

Rocco Design Architects Associates Limited (Chinese: 嚴迅奇建築師事務有限公司), led by Rocco Yim, is a design architectural practice based in Hong Kong. It is responsible for the design of many iconic buildings in Hong Kong and Guangdong province, including the Hong Kong Government Headquarters, iSQUARE, One Peking Road, Yunnan Museum and Guangdong Museum. It employs 160 staff in Hong Kong and Shenzhen.

Rocco S.K. Yim founded its predecessor firm Rocco Design Architects Limited in March 1979. Patrick P.W. Lee joined Rocco Design Partners in June 1980.

The firm exhibited four times at the Venice Biennale in 2002, 2006, 2010 and 2012. In 2015, the practice was invited to showcase their work at Architecture Forum Berlin, in the dedicated Exhibition titled "Intensity: the works of Rocco Design Architects, Hong Kong".

== Awards ==
The firm has received numerous awards, ARCASIA Gold Medals in 1994 and 2003, the Chicago Athenaeum Architectural Awards in 2006, 2011 and 2013, the Kenneth F. Brown Award in 2007, and the World Architecture Festival category winner in 2011.

Within the latest projects, The Yunnan Museum, opened to the public in 2015, has received a "HKIA Hong Kong Medal of the Year", and two Honorable Mentions at the International Design Awards 14 and Architizer Awards 2016.

== Notable works ==
- Chinese University of Hong Kong, Shenzhen Campus
- Bao'an Cultural Complex
- Wesleyan House Methodist International Church
- iSQUARE
- Yunnan Museum
- HKSAR Government Headquarters
- One Peking Road
- Citibank Plaza
- Man Yee Building
- China Online Centre
- Victoria Towers
- Guangdong Museum
- Hong Kong Palace Museum

== Gallery ==
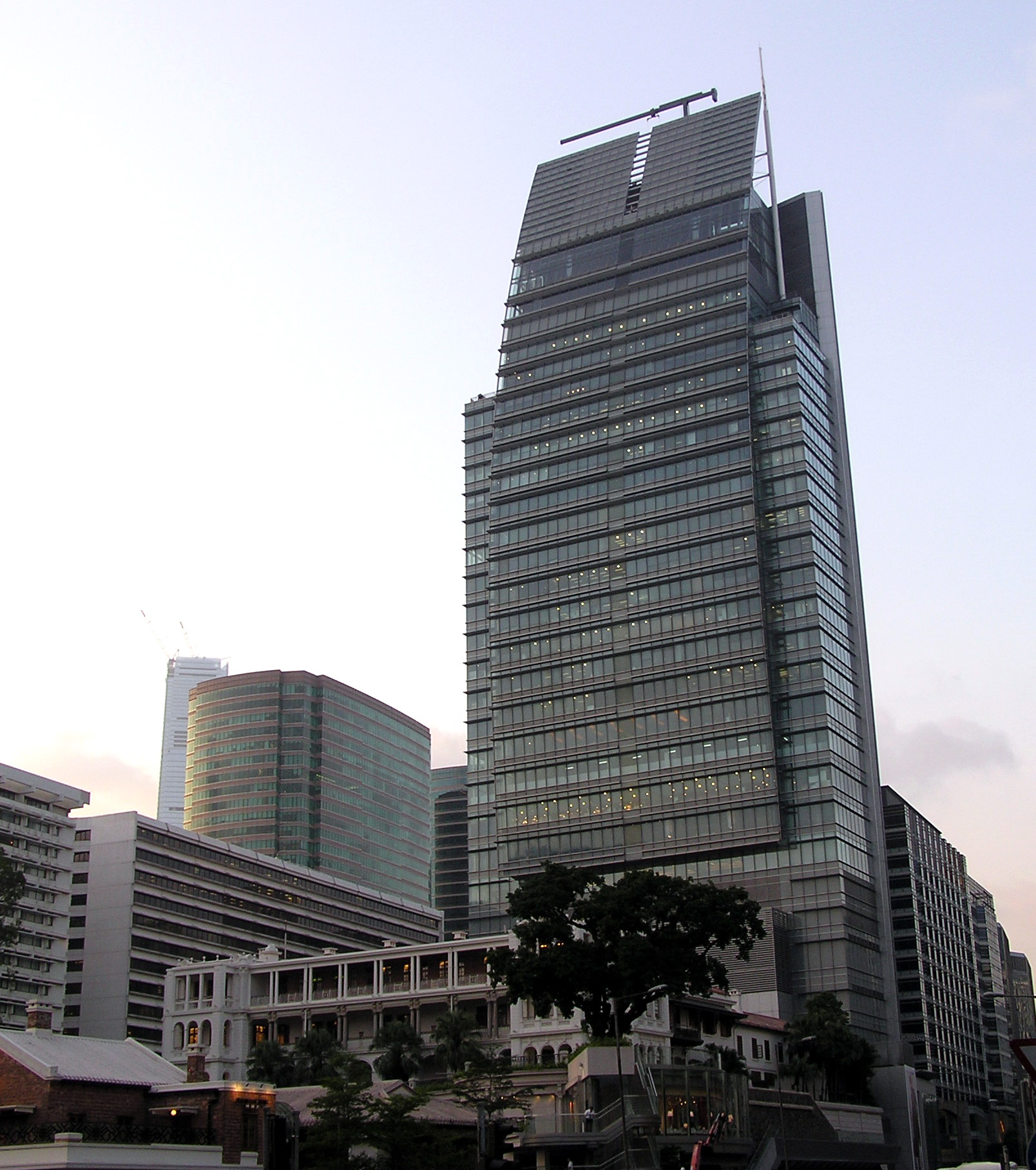
One Peking Road

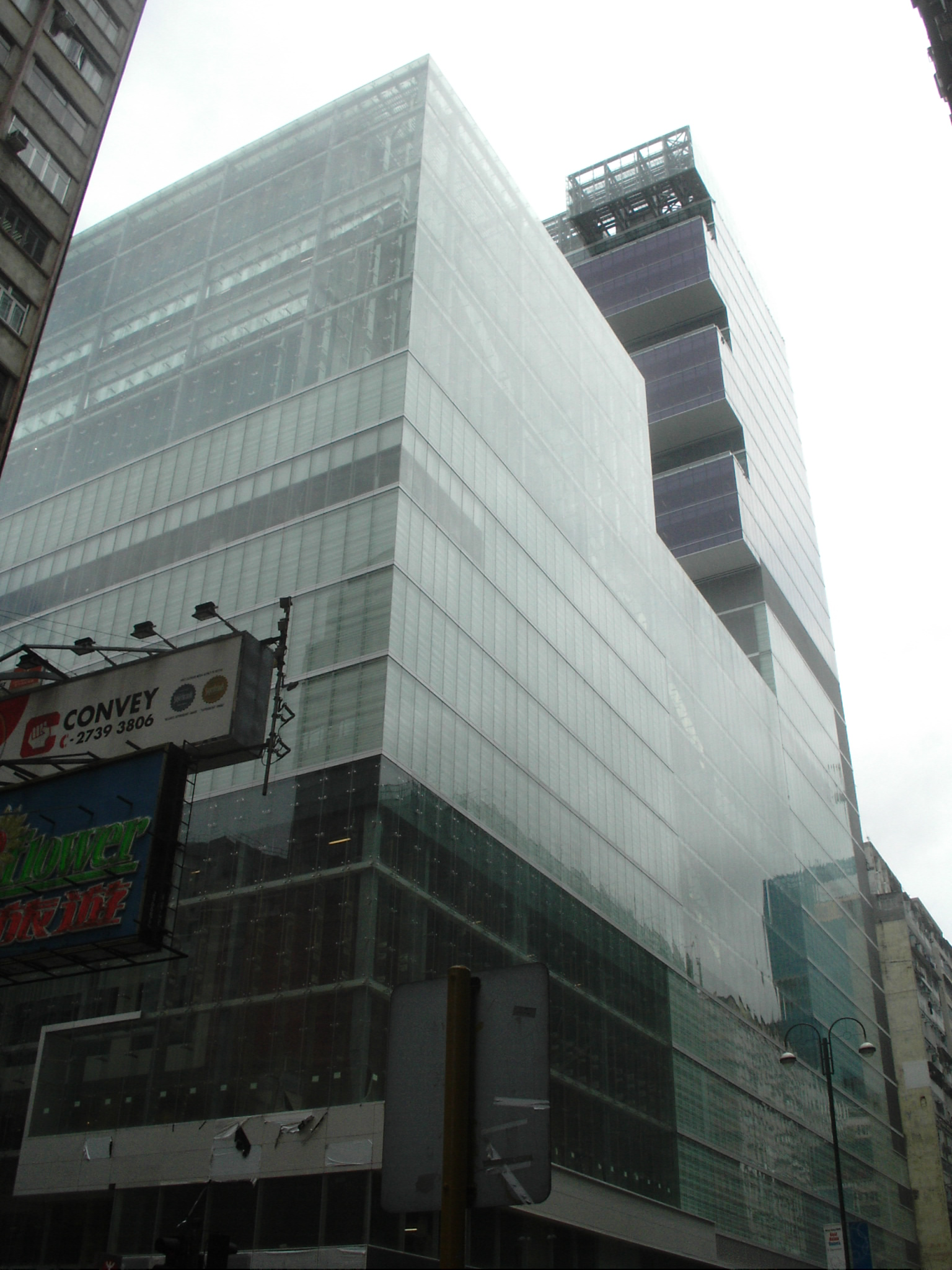
iSQUARE

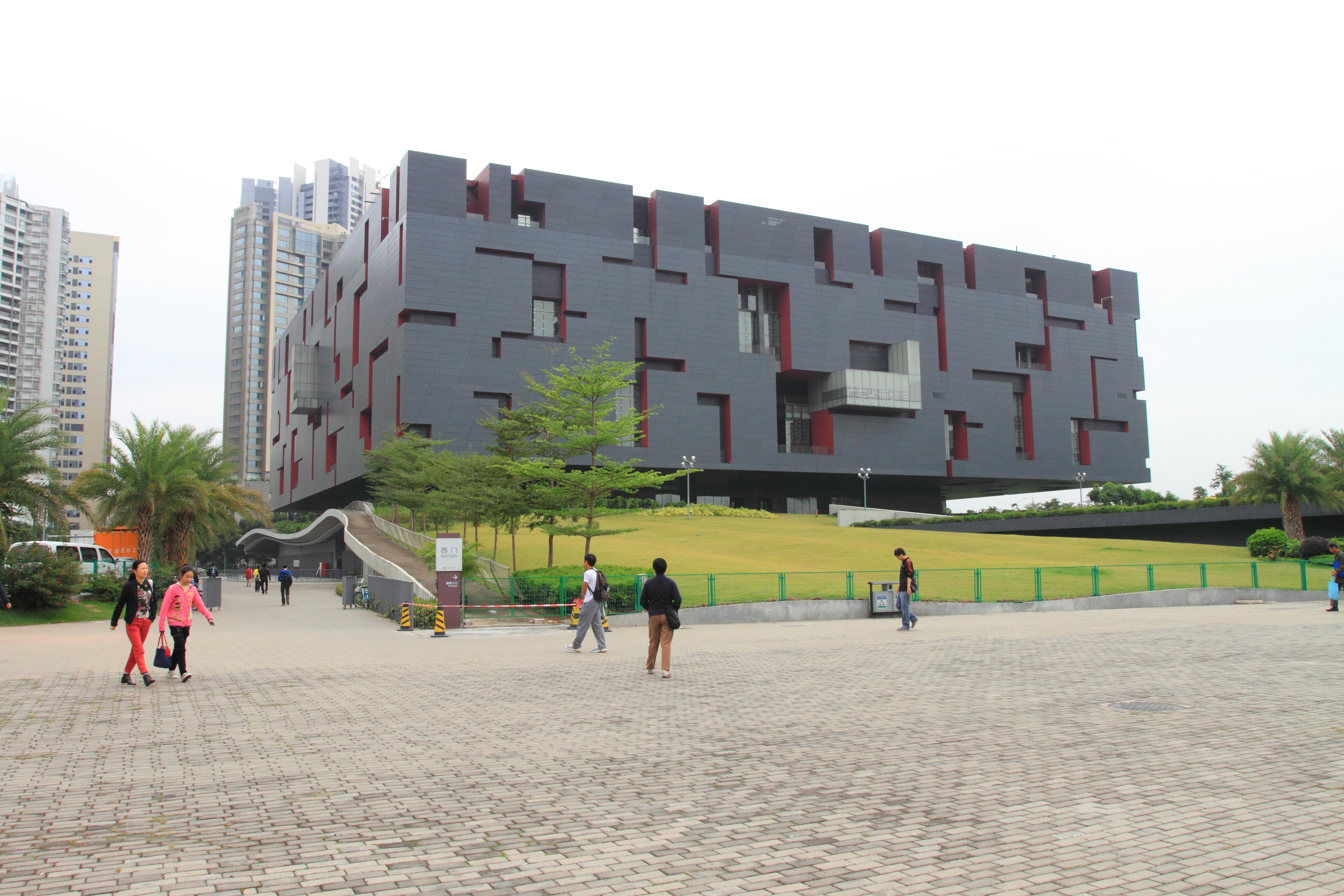
Guangdong Museum
