= Woodsville Interchange =

Woodsville Interchange is a major road interchange in Singapore. It marks the triple-point boundary of the planning areas of Kallang, Geylang and Toa Payoh.

At this interchange, four major roads (Serangoon Road, Upper Serangoon Road, MacPherson Road, Bendemeer Road), two service roads (Jalan Toa Payoh, Jalan Kolam Ayer) and one expressway (Pan Island Expressway; PIE) meet. This interchange has gone through several upgrading works to ease congestion, its latest upgrading completed in January 2012.

== History ==
The dual two-lane Woodsville Flyover was built between Jalan Kolam Ayer and Jalan Toa Payoh in 1982. Due to the increased traffic demand over the years, the flyover was upgraded in 1994 to a dual four-lane flyover, merging it with the Pan-Island Expressway extension. A flyover to cater to traffic heading towards the Central Expressway (CTE) was also included in the project.

Leading to 2007, traffic volumes on at-grade roads during peak hours at this interchange are very high, reaching up to 8400 vehicles per hour, reaching its traffic capacity. There has also been major traffic congestion at the at-grade road interchange, with a possible gridlock in a few years time. To ease the traffic flow, the Land Transport Authority announced in 2007 that the interchange will go through an upgrading project.

== 2008 Upgrading project ==
The Woodsville Interchange upgrading project commenced in the third quarter of 2007 with the awarding of the Singapore branch of Gammon Construction Limited as the main civil contractor after a six-months study conducted by Parsons Brinckerhoff Pte Ltd to evaluate the best construction method that is safe and best minimises inconvenience to motorists, residents and business owners. The project was expected to be completed by 2011 back then.

The project includes the building of three underpasses and an overpass. Two of the underpasses will have two lanes per direction each, stretching from Serangoon Road and Bendemeer Road to Upper Serangoon Road. The third underpass will have one lane and will stretch from MacPherson Road to Bendemeer Road. The flyover will stretch from a slip road of Exit 15 along Pan Island Expressway to Kallang Way. In addition, at-grade traffic flows will be modified, including the closing and removal of Whampoa North, a U-turn road from Bendemeer Road to Serangoon Road, with the land returning to the government.

This project is one of the most expensive of its kind at that time, costing S$130 million, several times more expensive than any single flyover and tunnel project completed elsewhere in Singapore. It is one of the most complex construction as well due to the MRT tunnel beneath the interchange and the Deep Tunnel Sewerage System which runs parallel to the expressway. Several buildings will be affected by the road widening and the former Serangoon Fire Station will have to be torn down.

=== Benefits ===
Once the upgrading project is completed, travel will be smoother between the east and the city; and the northeast and the city.

Traffic volume at the at-grade junction will also decrease allowing smoother traffic flow, especially for motorists entering Pan Island Expressway (westbound) from Upper Serangoon Road and MacPherson Road. The traffic capacity at this interchange will also increase to 11,000 vehicles per hour during peak hours.

== See also ==
- Pan Island Expressway
- Serangoon Road
- Blueprint of Woodsville Interchange Upgrading project
