= China Online Centre =

Skyscraper in Wan Chai, Hong Kong

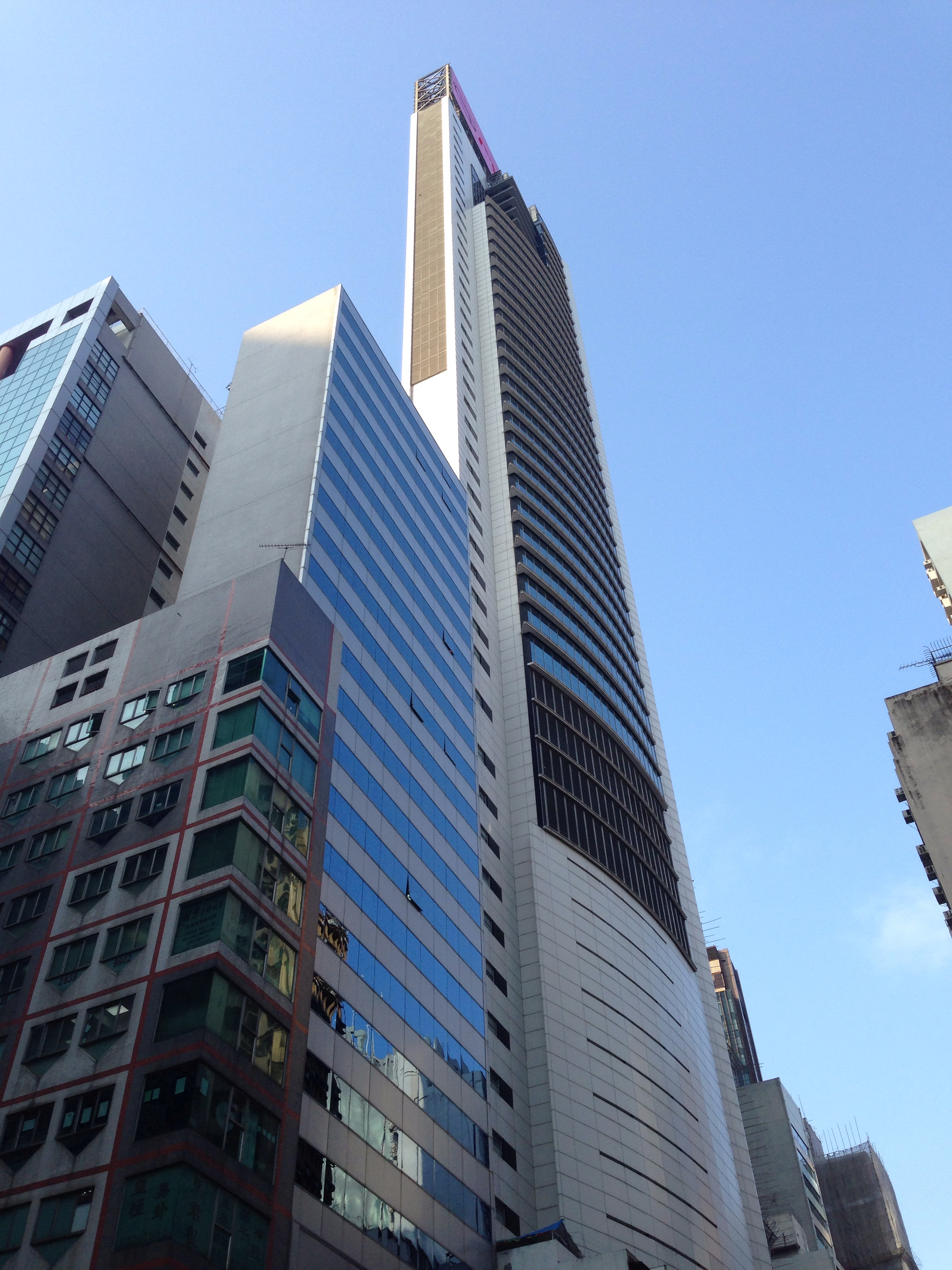
- Interactive map of the China Online Centre area

General information
- Status: Completed
- Type: Office
- Location: 333 Lockhart Road, Wan Chai, Hong Kong
- Coordinates: 22.27921°N 114.17836°E
- Completed: 2000
- Opening: 2000

Height
- Roof: 201 m (659 ft)

Technical details
- Floor count: 52
- Floor area: 16,000 m^{2} (170,000 sq ft)

Design and construction
- Architect: Rocco Design Limited
- Developer: Jaffe Development Ltd.

The China Online Centre (Chinese: 中國網絡中心) is a skyscraper located in the Wan Chai area of Hong Kong. The tower rises 52 floors and 201 metres (659 ft) in height. The building was completed in 2000. It was designed by architectural firm Rocco Design Limited, and was developed by Jaffe Development. The China Online Centre, which stands as the 52nd-tallest building in Hong Kong, is composed entirely of commercial office space. It has a total floor area of 16,000 square metres (170,000 sq ft).

== See also ==
- List of tallest buildings in Hong Kong
