= Gammon Construction =

Hong Kong construction company

- Company type: Private
- Industry: Construction
- Founded: 1919
- Founder: John C. Gammon
- Headquarters: Kwun Tong, Hong Kong
- Area served: Asia Pacific
- Owner: Jardine Matheson; Balfour Beatty
- Website: www.gammonconstruction.com

Gammon Construction
- Traditional Chinese: 金門建築有限公司
- Simplified Chinese: 金门建筑有限公司
Transcriptions
Standard Mandarin
- Hanyu Pinyin: Jīnmén Jiànzhù Yǒuxiàngōngsī
Yue: Cantonese
- Yale Romanization: Gām mùhn gin jūk yáuh haahn gūng sī
- Jyutping: Gam1 mun4 gin3 zuk1 jau5 haan6 gung1 si1

Gammon Construction Limited is a Hong Kong construction and engineering contractor headquartered in Kwun Tong, Hong Kong. In addition to local construction projects, it is also involved in the construction and engineering of various projects in China and Southeast Asia.

== History ==
The company originated from a construction business founded in India by John C. Gammon in 1919. In 1955, a branch was engaged to build a new runway at Kai Tak Airport in Hong Kong. In 1958, Gammon Construction Limited ("Gammon") was formed to establish a permanent presence in Hong Kong.

Once incorporated in Hong Kong, it grew rapidly, obtaining construction work of a diverse nature. By the late 1970s, it was established as the leading contractor in Hong Kong, participating in many of the major infrastructure projects of that time. The company began to expand business outside Hong Kong, establishing offices in Singapore and Vietnam.

== Ownership ==
Jardine Matheson took a minority interest in Gammon in 1969 and it became a public company in 1970. Then in 1975, Jardines acquired the remaining shareholding and thus Gammon became a wholly owned subsidiary of Jardines. In late 1983, Jardine Matheson sold 50 percent of Gammon to Trafalgar House, a UK-based company involved in construction, shipping and property.

Gammon then became the preferred constructor throughout the Asia-Pacific region for both Jardines and Trafalgar House. In 1996, Kvaerner took over Trafalgar House, thereby acquiring its 50% interest in Gammon. Skanska acquired all of Kvaerner's construction businesses, including Gammon, in late 2000. Balfour Beatty, the international engineering, construction and services group, subsequently purchased Skanska's 50% in Gammon in 2004.

== Corporate affairs ==
It has its head office in Kwun Tong. It occupies 36,900 square feet (3,430 m^{2}) of space there. It moved there circa 2019.

Previously its head office was in TaiKoo Place in Quarry Bay.

In June 2024, Gammon Construction Limited was among ten companies to receive the (Building and Construction Information) BCI Asia Top 10 Contractors Award.

== Notable projects ==
Gammon has been involved in the construction of various major projects in Hong Kong and around the region:

- Trackwork contract for the MRT Phases I, IA, and II in Singapore completed in 1990
- Bukit Panjang LRT line in Singapore completed in 1999
- The North East section of Chinatown MRT station in Singapore completed in 2003
- Chater House in Central, Hong Kong completed in 2002
- Tseung Kwan O line extension in Hong Kong completed in 2002
- One Peking Road in Kowloon, Hong Kong completed in 2003
- Le Méridien Cyberport in Southern District, Hong Kong completed in 2004
- Three Pacific Place in Admiralty, Hong Kong completed in 2004
- Maintenance depot on the Ma On Shan line in Hong Kong completed in 2004
- The Disneyland Resort line on the Tsing Chau Tsai Peninsula in Hong Kong completed in 2005
- The northern section of the Kong Sham Western Highway completed in 2007
- One Island East in Eastern District, Hong Kong completed in 2008
- Upgrading of the Woodsville Interchange in Singapore completed in 2008
- Nam Wan Tunnel in Hong Kong completed in 2009
- iSQUARE in Kowloon, Hong Kong completed in 2009
- Institute of Technical Education College West Campus in Singapore completed in 2010
- The Downtown section of the Chinatown MRT station in Singapore completed in 2013
- The Cathay Pacific Cargo Terminal at Hong Kong International Airport completed in 2015
- The Midfield Concourse at Hong Kong International Airport completed in 2016
- The northern section of the Hong Kong West Kowloon railway station completed in 2018
- The southern section of the Tuen Mun–Chek Lap Kok Link completed in 2018
- Mayflower MRT station in Singapore completed in 2021
- Havelock MRT station in Singapore completed in 2022

The company is also involved in the construction for the Cross Island section of the Ang Mo Kio MRT station due to be completed in 2030.
