= ISQUARE =

Shopping centre in Tsim Sha Tsui, Hong Kong

iSQUARE

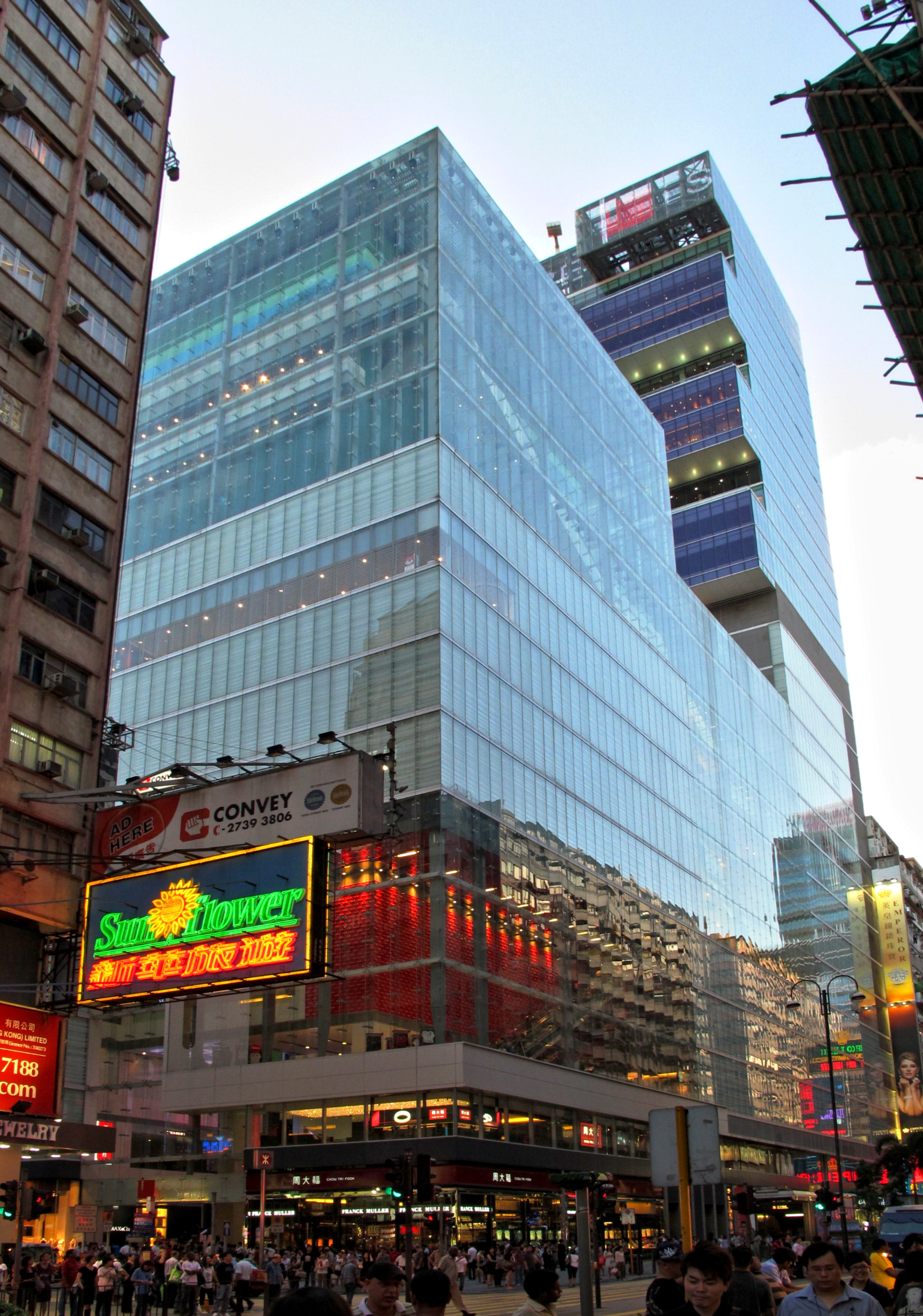
- iSQUARE in June 2010
- Location: 63 Nathan Road, Tsim Sha Tsui, Hong Kong
- Coordinates: 22°17′49″N 114°10′19″E
- Opened: 17 December 2009; 16 years ago
- Developer: Associated International Hotels Ltd.
- Manager: DTZ
- Owner: Associated International Hotels Ltd.
- Architect: Rocco Design Architects Limited, Benoy Architects
- Floor area: 600,000 sq ft (56,000 m^{2})
- Floors: 30
- Website: isquare.hk

ISQUARE
- Traditional Chinese: 國際廣場
- Simplified Chinese: 国际广场
Transcriptions
Standard Mandarin
- Hanyu Pinyin: Guójì guǎngchǎng
Yue: Cantonese
- Jyutping: gwok3 zai3 gwong2 coeng4

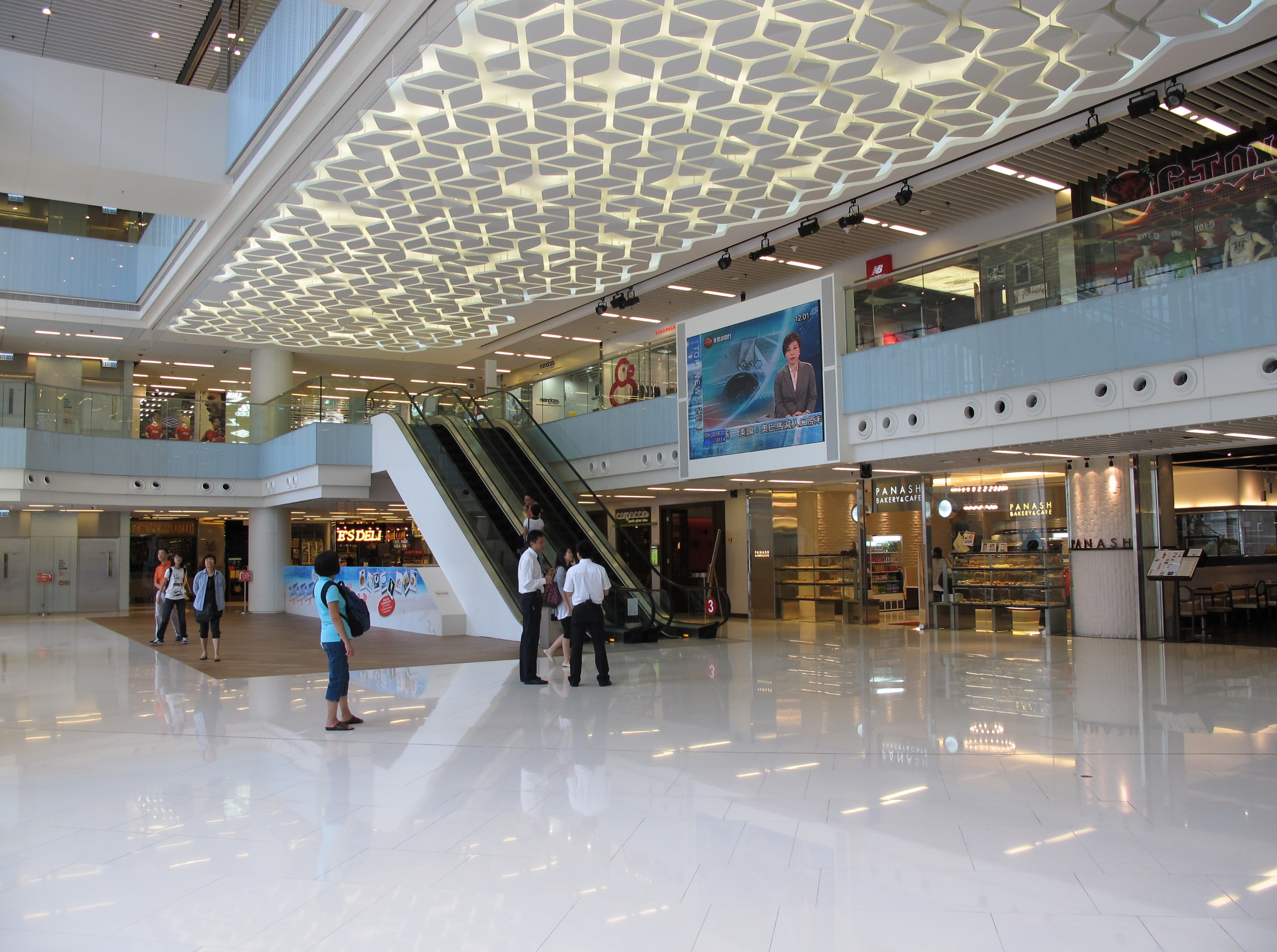
iFunction Void in Level 3

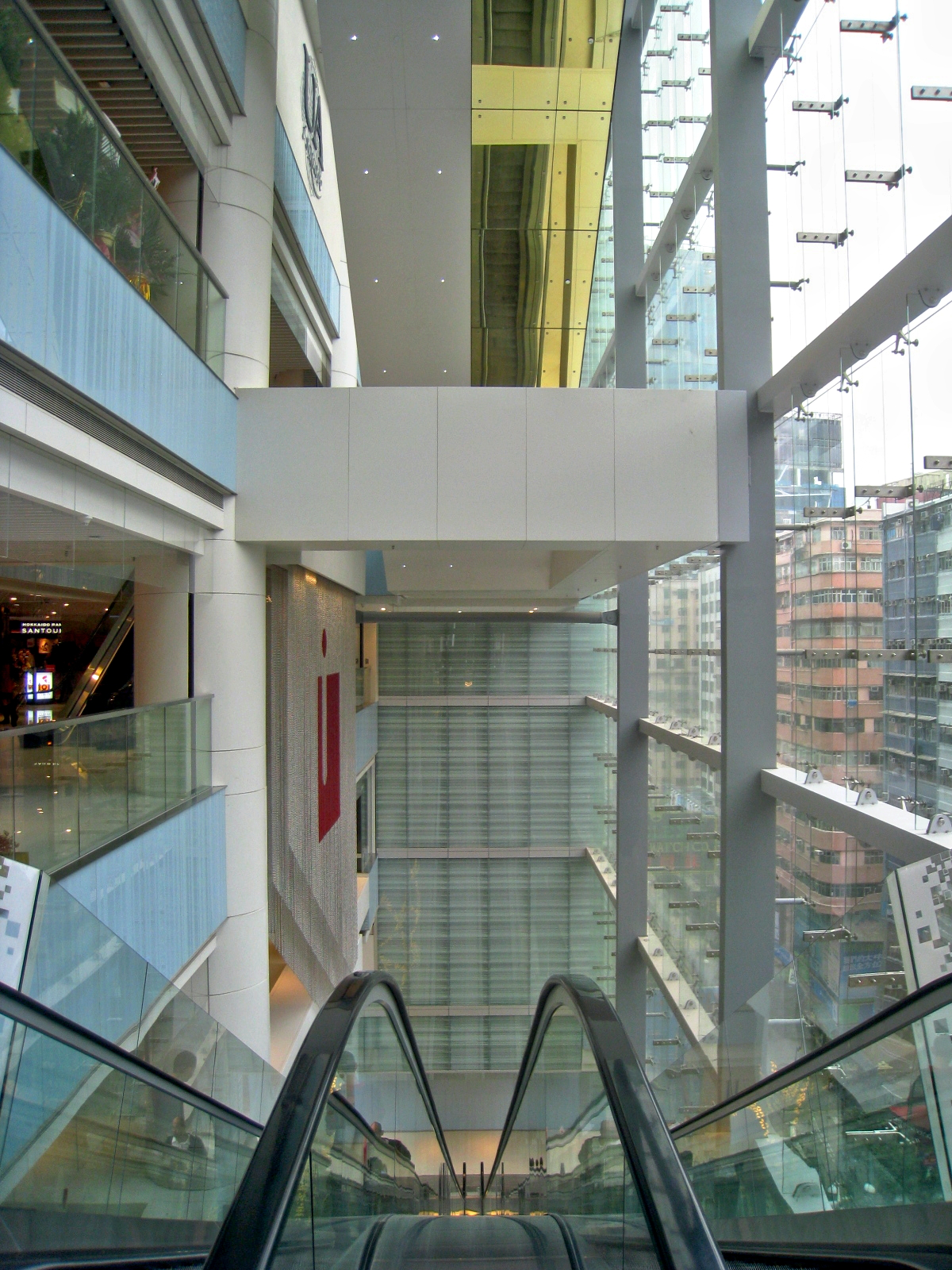
Void

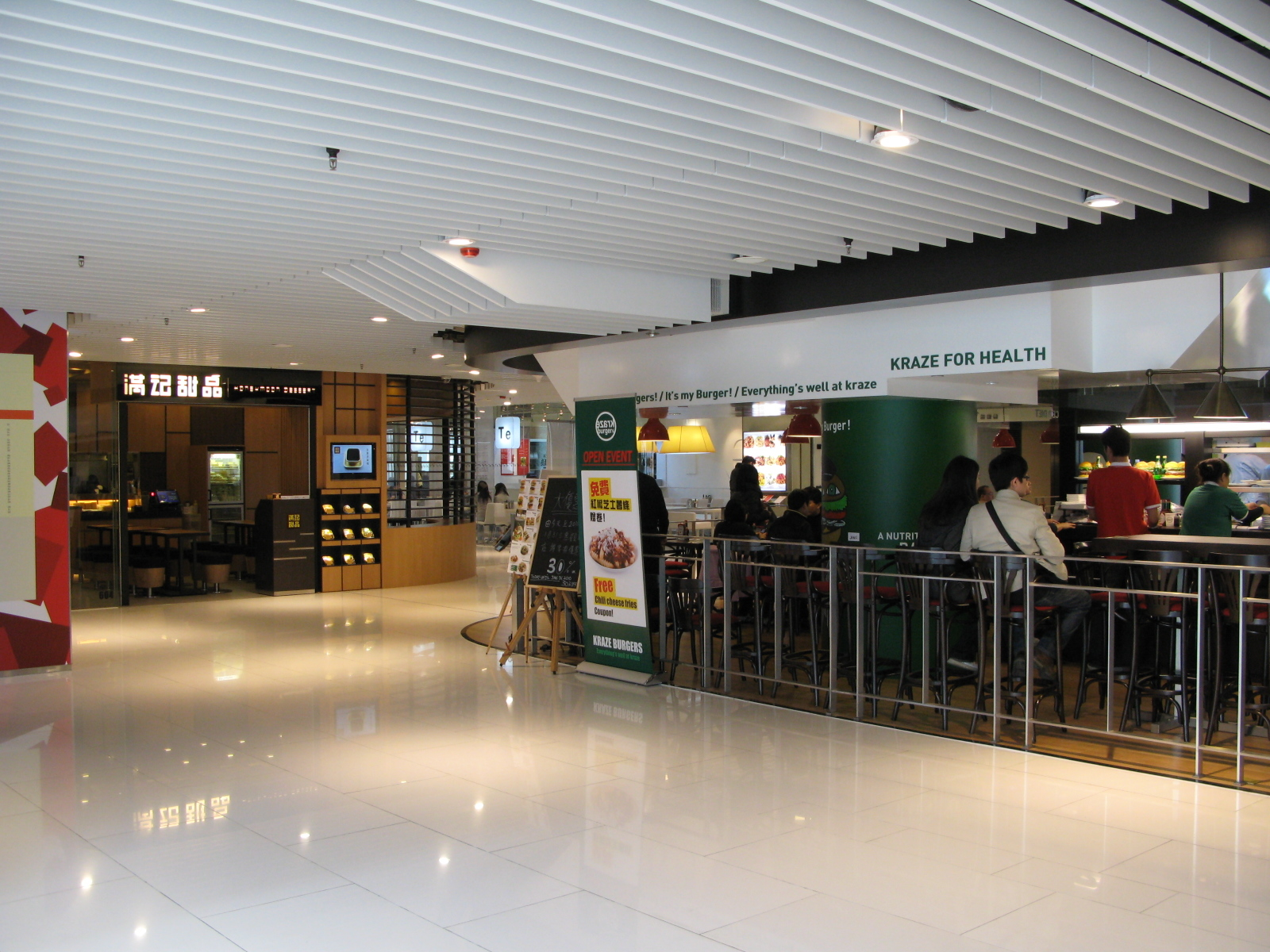
F&B Outlet in Level 6

iSQUARE (Chinese: 國際廣場; Jyutping: gwok3 zai3 gwong2 coeng4) is a 31-storey shopping centre located at 63 Nathan Road, Tsim Sha Tsui, Kowloon, Hong Kong, on the site of the former Hyatt Regency Hotel. It was developed by, and is now owned by, Associated International Hotels zh:凱聯國際.

== History ==
International Plaza is the site of the former Hyatt Regency Hong Kong, which opened in 1969 and closed on 1 January 2006. The owner, Hyatt Regency International, and Tandem Properties jointly announced on 20 October 2004, the redevelopment of the former Hyatt Regency Hong Kong into a retail-led building named "International Square", or "iSQUARE" in English. The demolition of the former Hyatt Regency Hotel was completed on 1 January 2007, and construction of the building (a 30-storey retail mall), named International Plaza, commenced in September of the same year.

== Introduction ==
iSQUARE Shopping mall was designed by architecture firms Rocco Design Ltd and Benoy. It has approximately 600,000 square feet (56,000 m^{2}) of shops and entertainment outlets. Situated at the intersection of Nathan Road and Peking Road, iSQUARE was the first shopping and entertainment complex with a direct pedestrian link to Tsim Sha Tsui MTR station. The retail space is located from the basement to level 8. On level 7, there are five cinemas with a total of 1,000 seats. iTOWER has 20 storeys and includes several restaurants, with views of Victoria Harbour. One floor is occupied by owner Associated International Hotels Ltd. It was built by Gammon Construction and completed in 2009.

== Features ==
iSQUARE's exterior wall comprises more than 4,000 glass and special components. The Peking Road entrance has an LED screen playing different types of animation, and the LB floor also has a projection device wall.

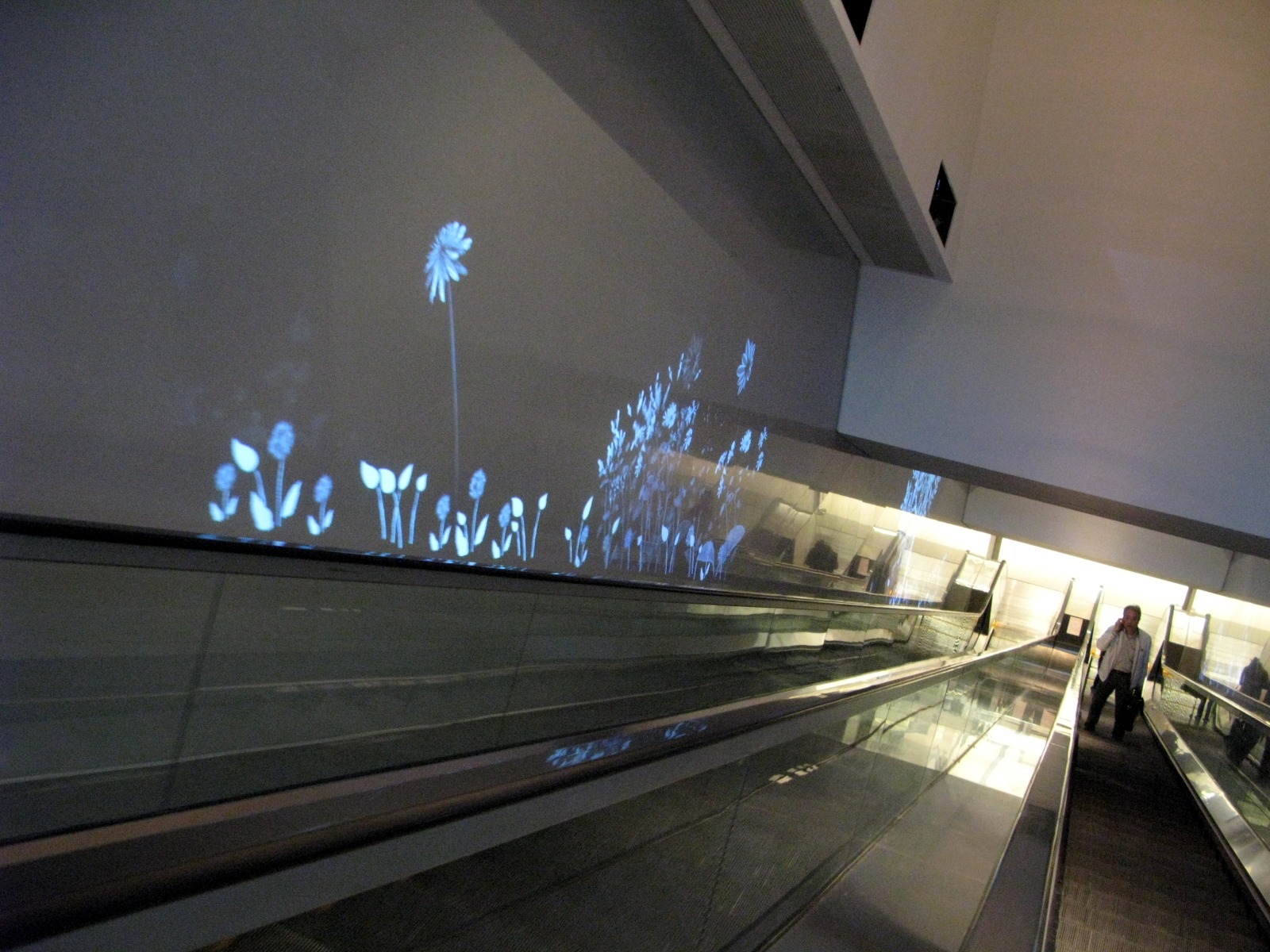
Interactive Projection in between MTR level to ground floor

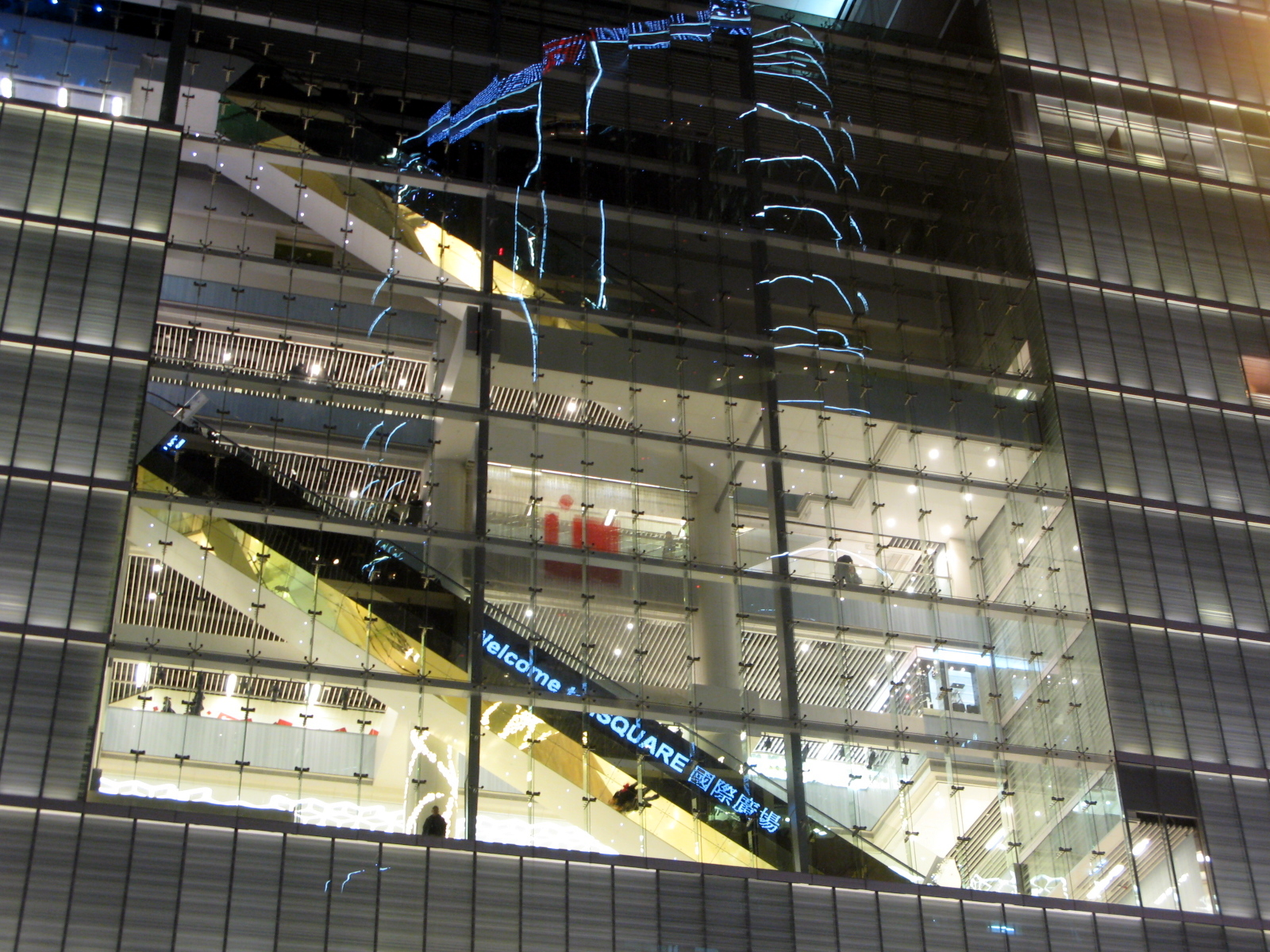
The escalator which located near to Nathan Road, installed with LED lights

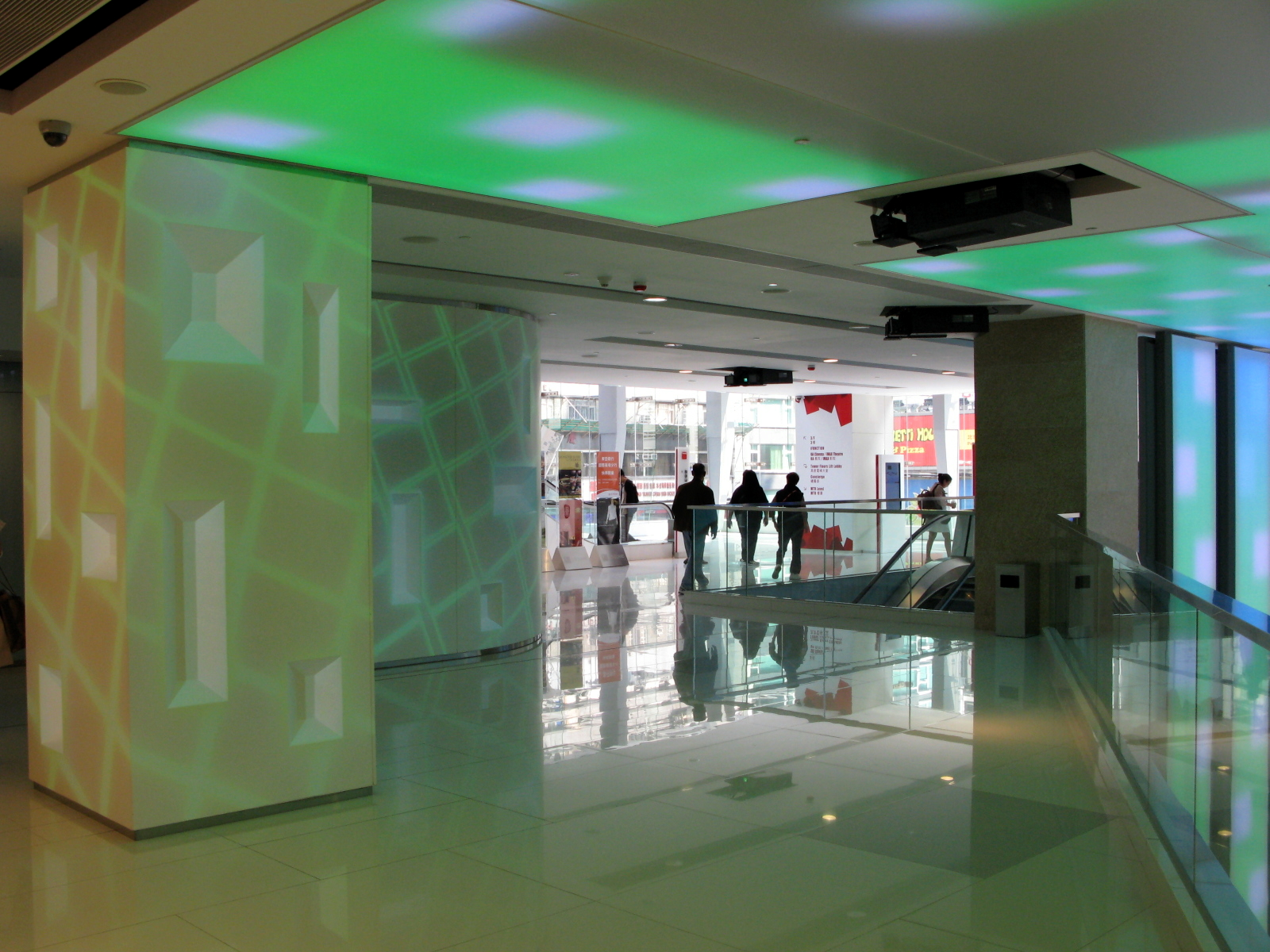
Visual Field in LB Level of Shopping centre

== Retail space ==
The mall has an approximately 600,000 square feet (56,000 m^{2}) for shopping. It has over 140 shops.
