= Peking Road =

Road between Nathan Road and Canton Road in Tsim Sha Tsui, Kowloon, Hong Kong

Coordinates: 22.29628°N 114.17073°E

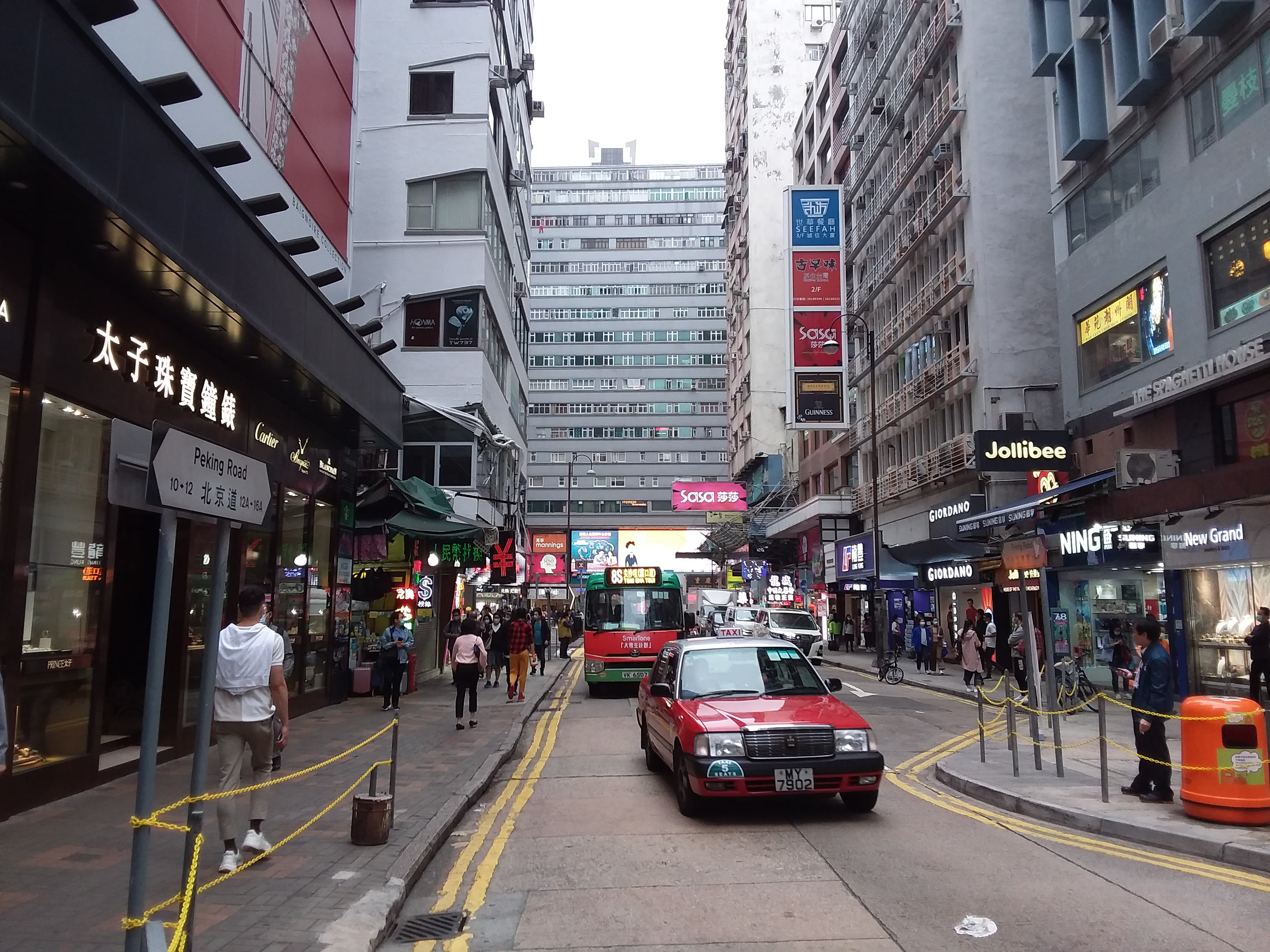
- Peking Road in 2020
- Chinese: 北京道
Transcriptions
Standard Mandarin
- Hanyu Pinyin: Běijīng Dào
Yue: Cantonese
- Yale Romanization: bak1 ging1 dou6

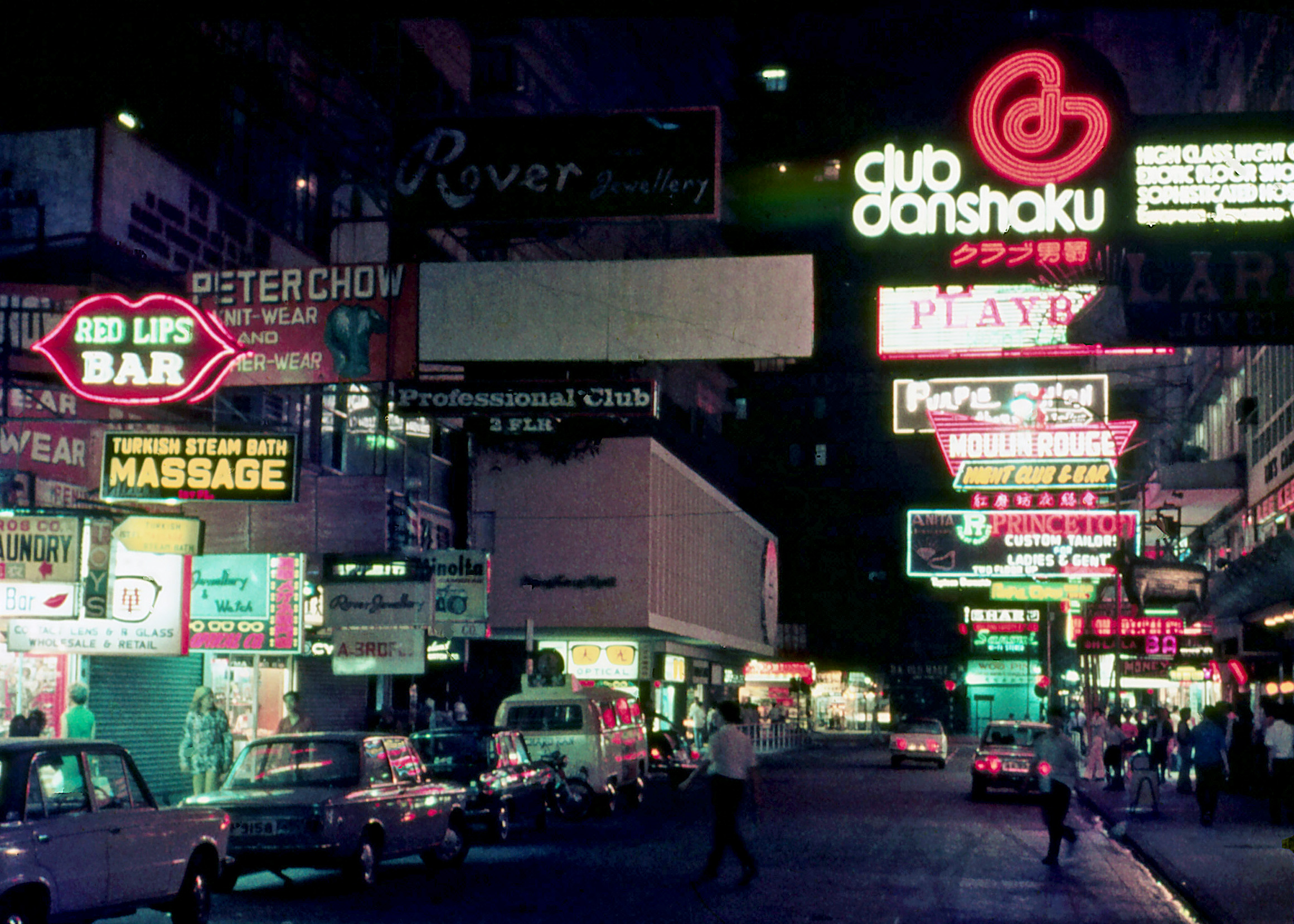
Peking Road in 1971

Peking Road (/ˌpiːˈkɪŋ/, Chinese: 北京道; Jyutping: bak1 ging1 dou6) is a road between Nathan Road and Canton Road in Tsim Sha Tsui, Kowloon, Hong Kong. The road is mainly hotels and shopping area on the street level.

== Name ==
The road was initially named Chater Road, after Paul Chater, who developed the southwest point of Tsim Sha Tsui through The Wharf. To avoid confusion with Chater Road on Hong Kong Island, the road was renamed as Peking Road in 1909, where Peking is an alternative way of romanising the name of the Chinese city Beijing.

== Features ==
- One Peking Road. A commercial building at the former location of the Tsim Sha Tsui Market. (#1)
- The Langham, Hong Kong (#8)
- iSQUARE. At the corner with Nathan Road.

== See also ==
- List of streets and roads in Hong Kong
