= Carnarvon Road, Hong Kong =

Street in Hong Kong

Coordinates: 22.29781°N 114.17312°E

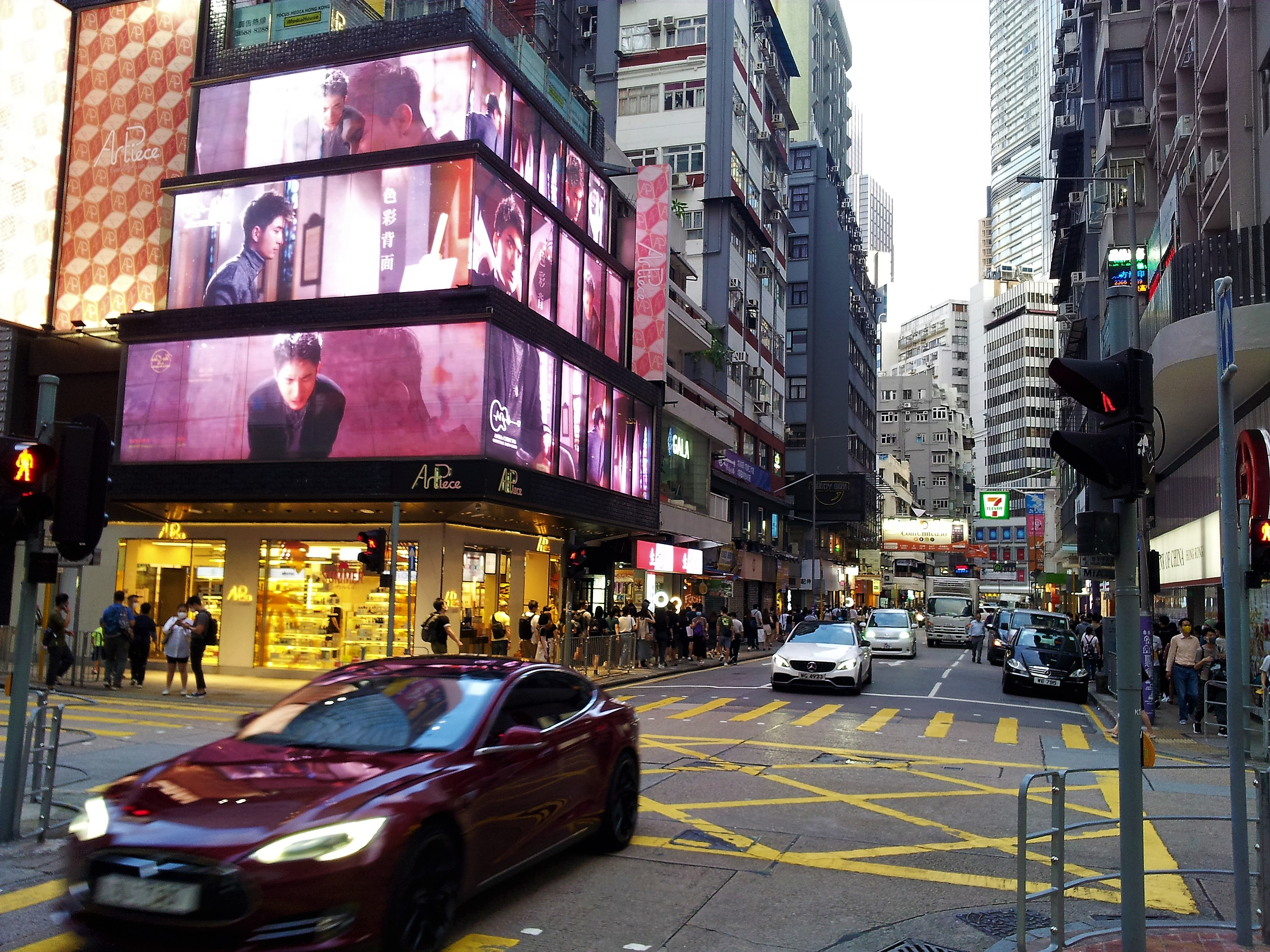
Carnarvon Road near the junction of Granville Road in June 2022

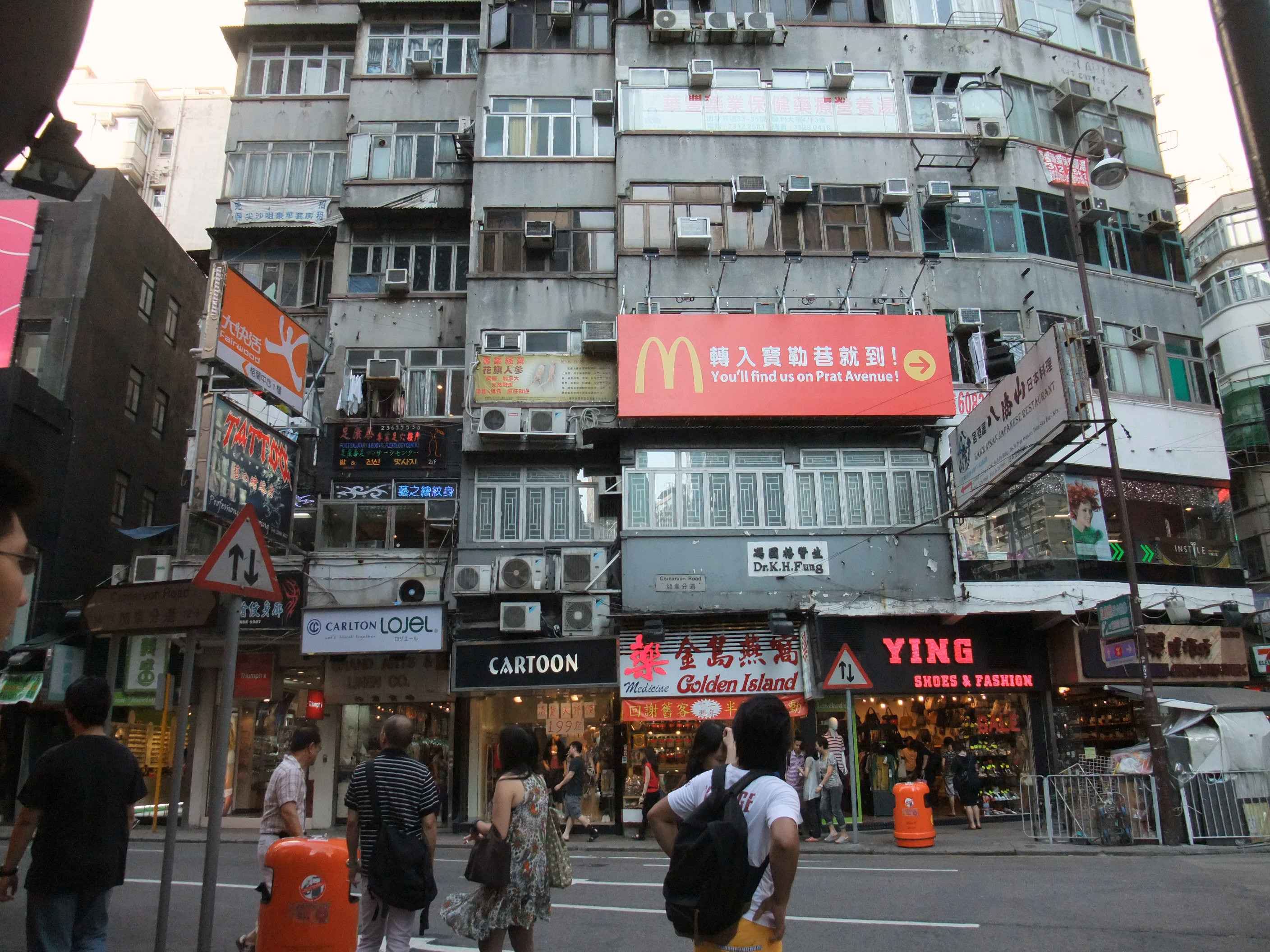
James S. Lee Mansion at the Carnarvon Road in August 2011

Carnarvon Road (Chinese: 加拿分道) is a street in Tsim Sha Tsui, Kowloon, Hong Kong. It forms the shape of an uppercase "J", linking Kimberley Road (near Knutsford Terrace) and Nathan Road.

== Name ==
The street is named after Henry Herbert, 4th Earl of Carnarvon, Secretary of State for the Colonies from 1866 to 1867 and from 1874 to 1878. The town and county in Wales to which the title of Earl of Carnarvon refers are historically spelled Caernarfon, having been Anglicised to Carnarvon or Caernarvon.

== Shopping ==
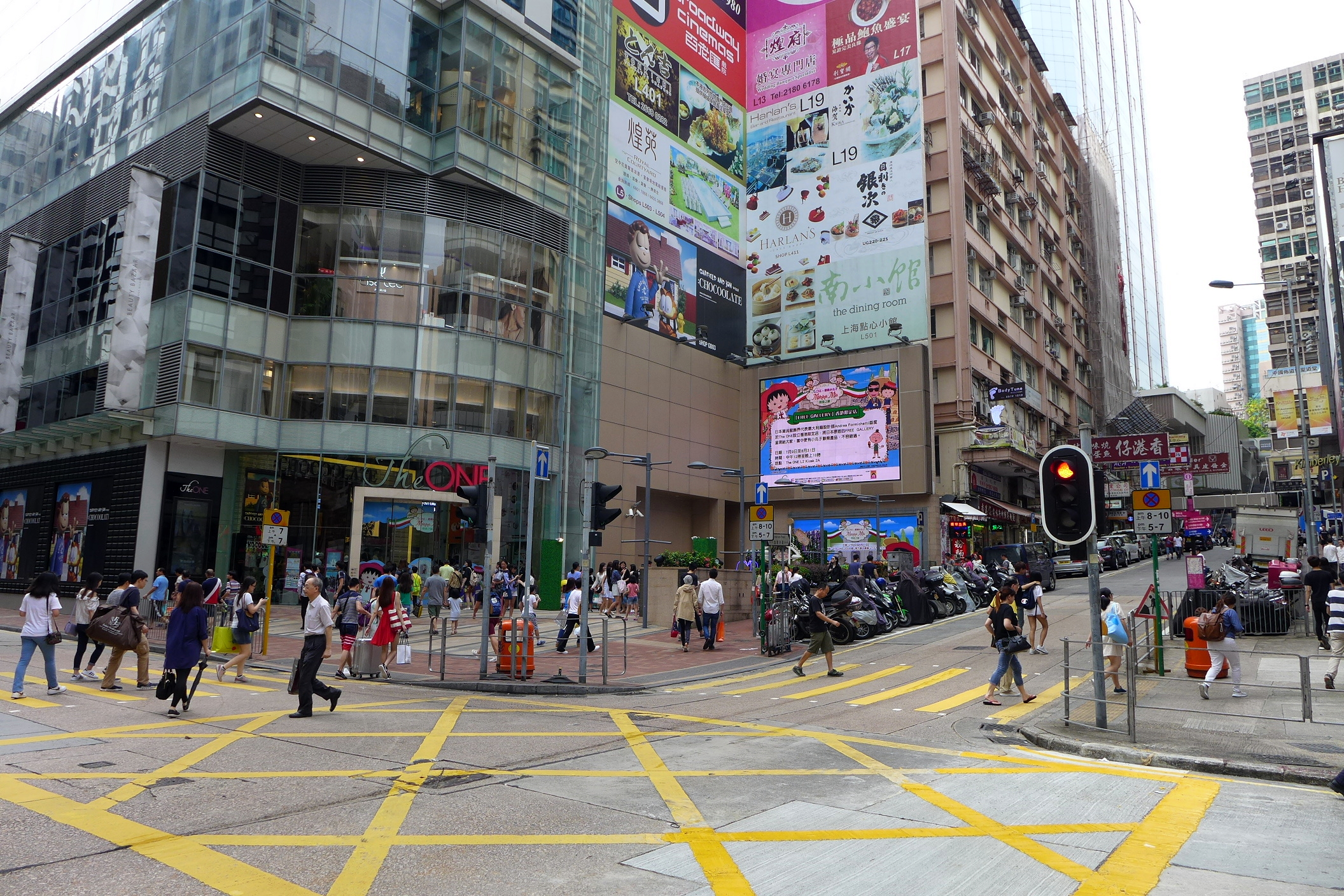
Carnarvon Road near The ONE Shopping Centre in July 2016

The area east of Nathan Road, comprising Cameron Road, Granville Road and Carnarvon Road has been described as having "teeming shops" and likely the main reason that Hong Kong acquired the "shopping paradise" tag, a phrase first put into print in an ironic manner by author Han Suyin in her 1952 novel A Many-Splendoured Thing.

== Roads nearby ==
- Granville Road
- Hanoi Road
- Kimberley Street
- Kimberley Road
- Hau Fook Street
- Cameron Road
- Hart Avenue
- Humphrey's Avenue
- Bristol Avenue

== Nearby ==
- East Tsim Sha Tsui station
- Tung Ying Building
