= Granville Road =

Street in Hong Kong

Coordinates: 22.300195°N 114.174532°E

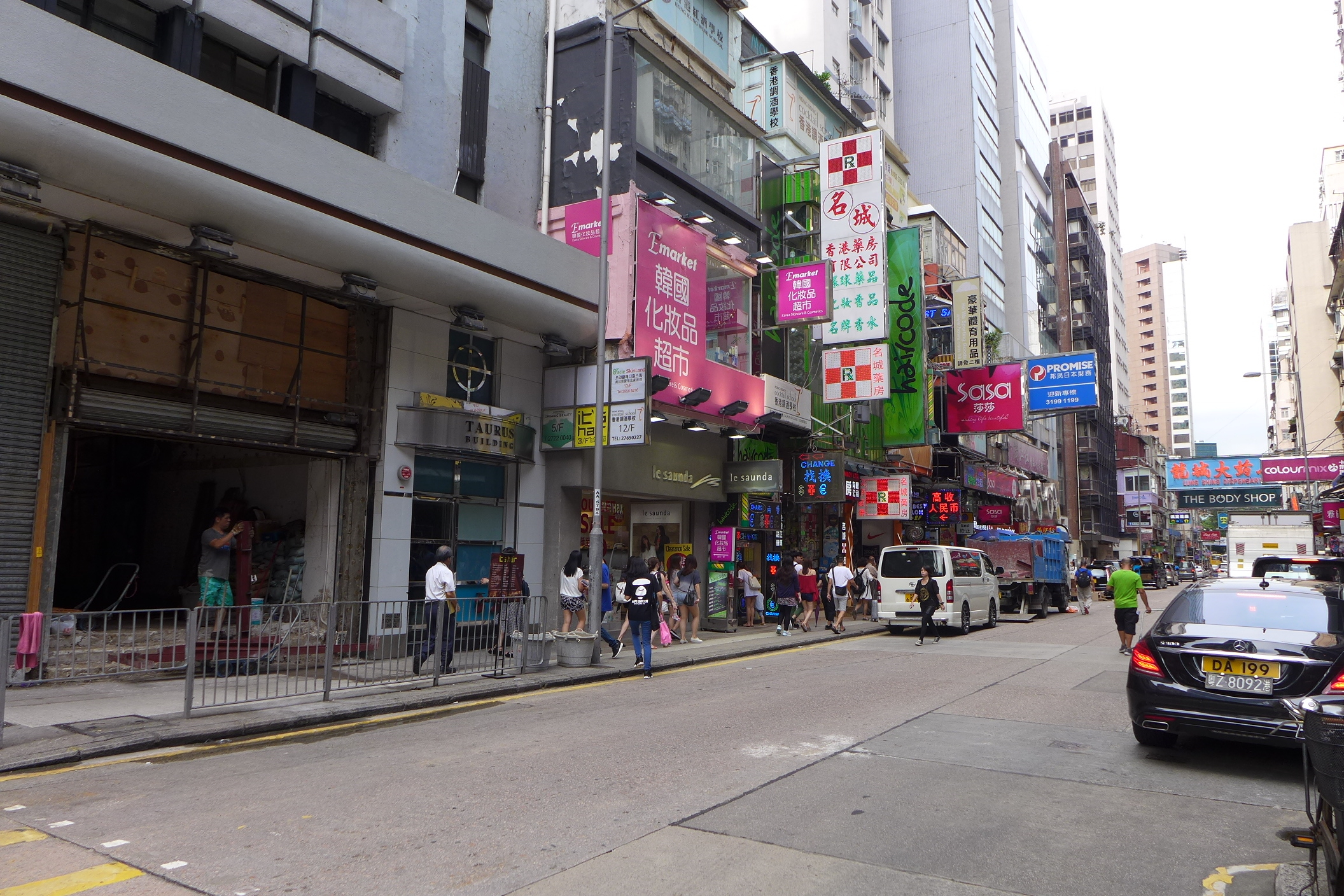
Shops in Granville Road in July 2016

Granville Road (Chinese: 加連威老道) is a street in Tsim Sha Tsui, Hong Kong.

== Location ==
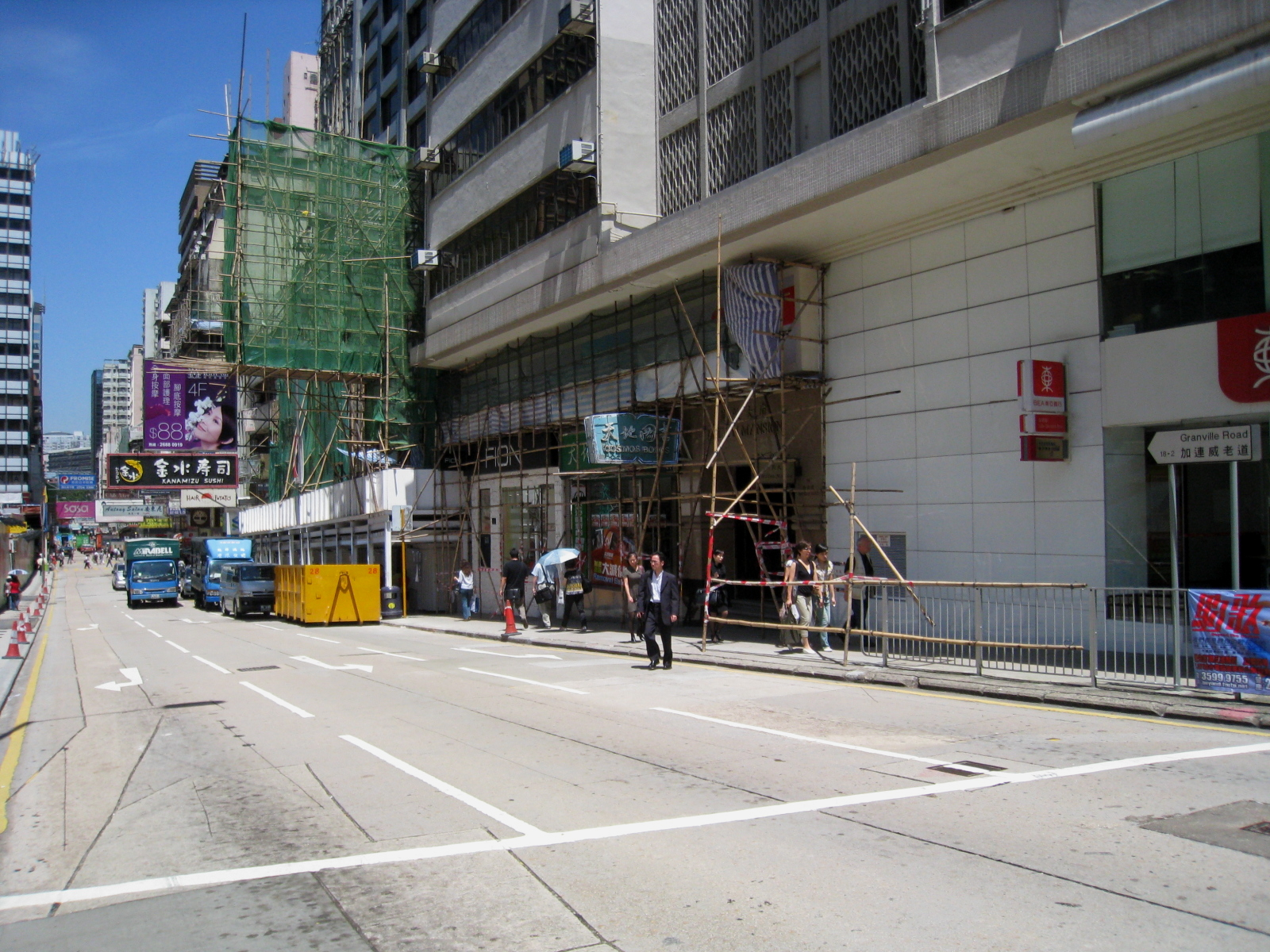
Western section of Granville Road, near its intersection with Nathan Road in July 2008.

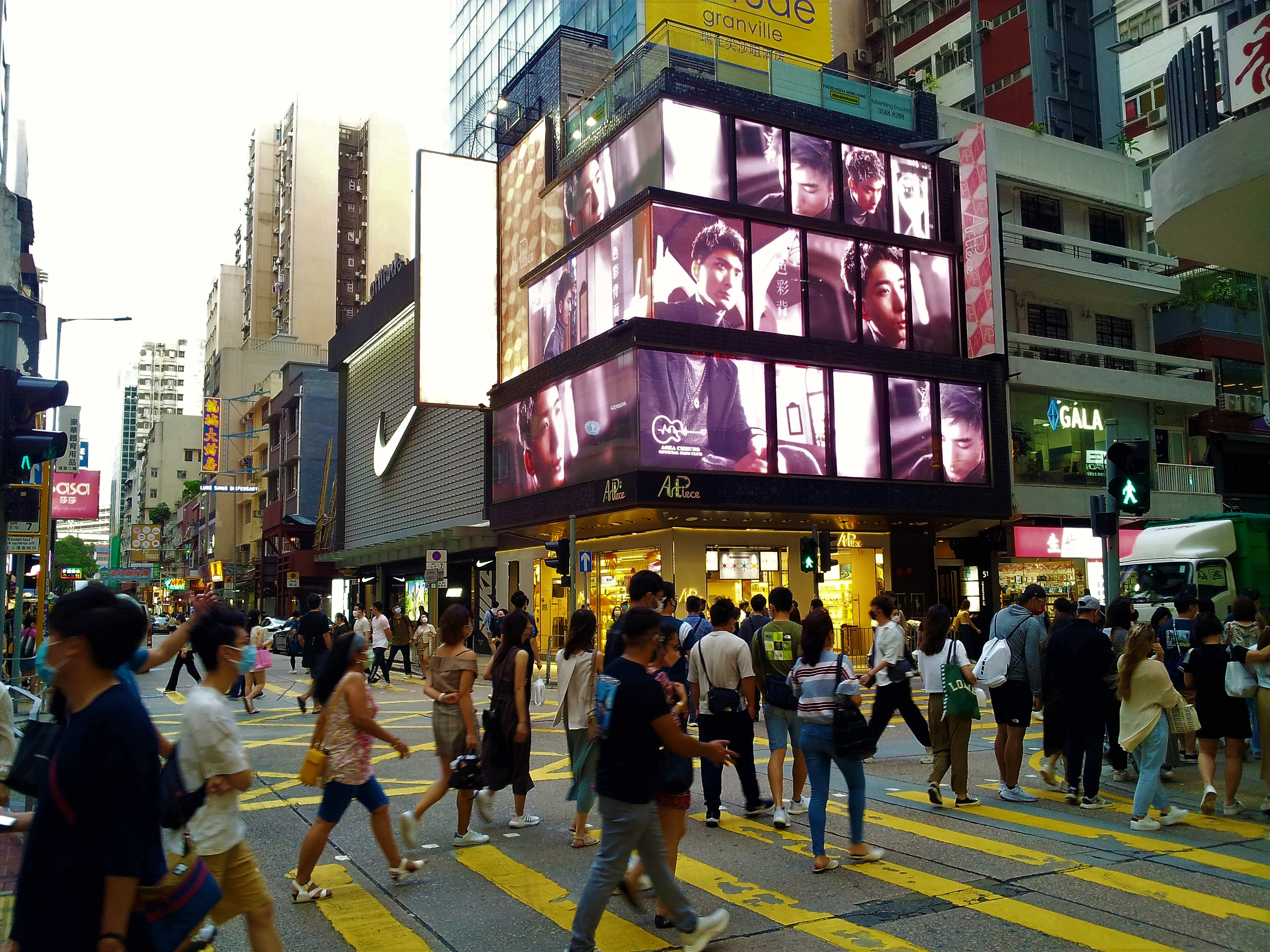
Centre section of Granville Road, before its junction with Carnarvon Road in June 2022.

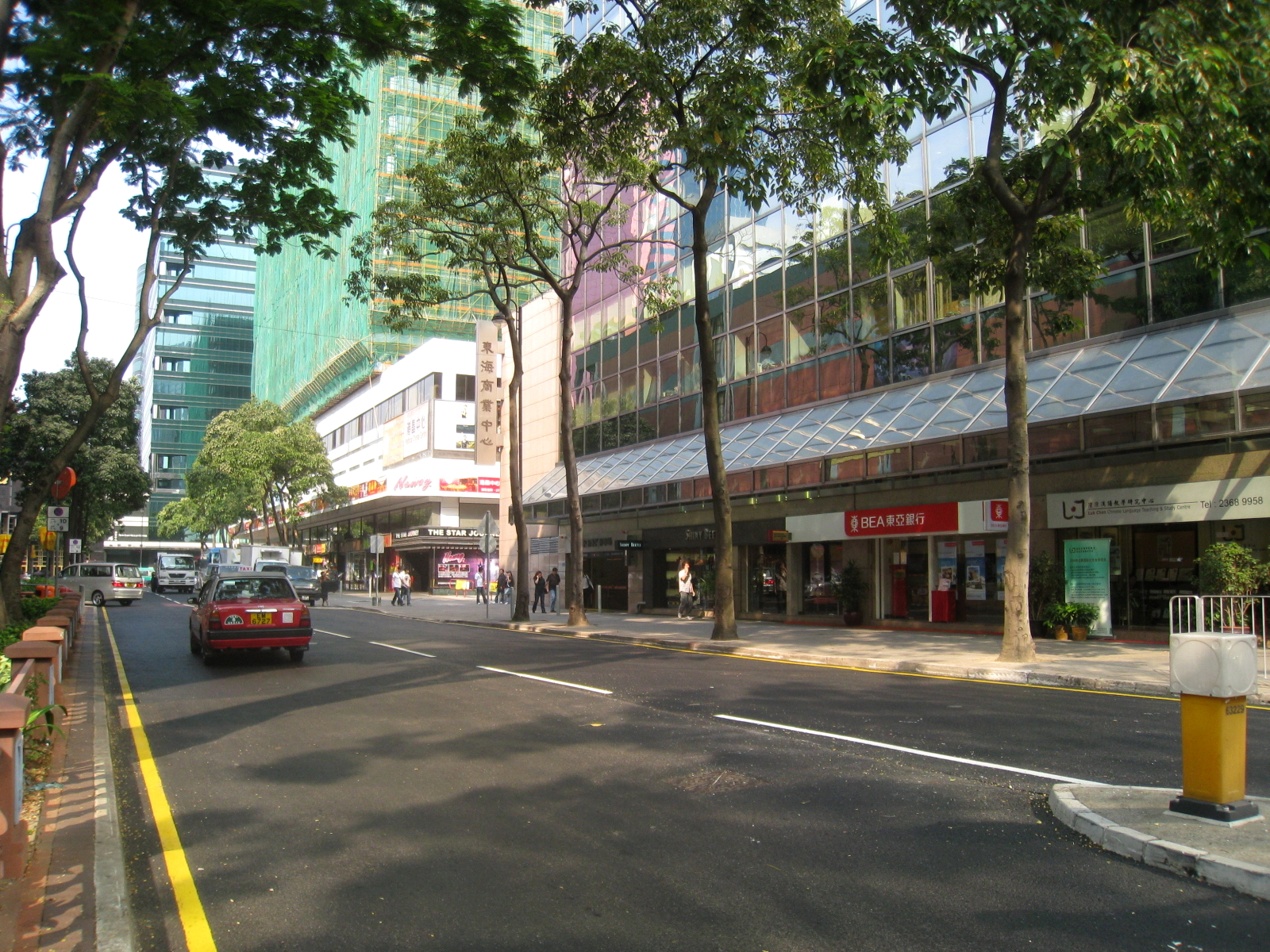
Eastern section of Granville Road in May 2009.

The street consists of two sections: a western section running between Nathan Road and Chatham Road South, which runs almost parallel to Kimberley Road, Cameron Road and Kimberley Street. This section was built in the late 19th century. The eastern section runs between Chatham Road and Science Museum Road, which was built by extending the original western portion to Tsim Sha Tsui East via reclamation. A public square called Granville Square in Tsim Sha Tsui East was named after the road.

== Name ==
The Road first appeared on the Rates List for 1896/7. It was named after Granville Leveson-Gower, 2nd Earl Granville, who was the Secretary of State for the Colonies from 1868 to 1870 and in 1886.

== Landmarks ==
Two of Hong Kong's main public museums, Hong Kong Museum of History and Hong Kong Science Museum, are located on the eastern stretch of Granville Road. Kowloon Park is located towards the western end of Granville Road.

Shopping centre The ONE, and its predecessor Tung Ying Building, are located on the corner between Granville Road and Nathan Road. The private gallery Hong Kong 3D Museum is in Hilton Place on the eastern stretch of Granville Road.

Apartment 31 was the site of the infamous Hello Kitty murder that took place in 1999. The apartment was demolished in 2012 and rebuilt as a hotel in 2016.

== Shopping ==
The area east of Nathan Road, comprising Cameron Road, Granville Road and Carnarvon Road has been described as having "teeming shops" and likely the main reason that Hong Kong acquired the "shopping paradise" tag, a phrase first put into print in an ironic manner by author Han Suyin, in her 1952 novel A Many-Splendoured Thing.

== See also ==
- List of streets and roads in Hong Kong
