= Korean Street, Hong Kong =

Ethnic enclave in Hong Kong, China

Coordinates: 22.30059°N 114.17487°E

- Traditional Chinese: 韓國街
- Simplified Chinese: 韩国街
Transcriptions
Standard Mandarin
- Hanyu Pinyin: Hánguójiē
Yue: Cantonese
- Jyutping: hon4 gwok3 gaai1

Alternative Chinese name
- Traditional Chinese: 小韓國
- Simplified Chinese: 小韩国
Transcriptions
Standard Mandarin
- Hanyu Pinyin: Xiǎo Hánguó
Yue: Cantonese
- Jyutping: siu2 hon4 gwok3

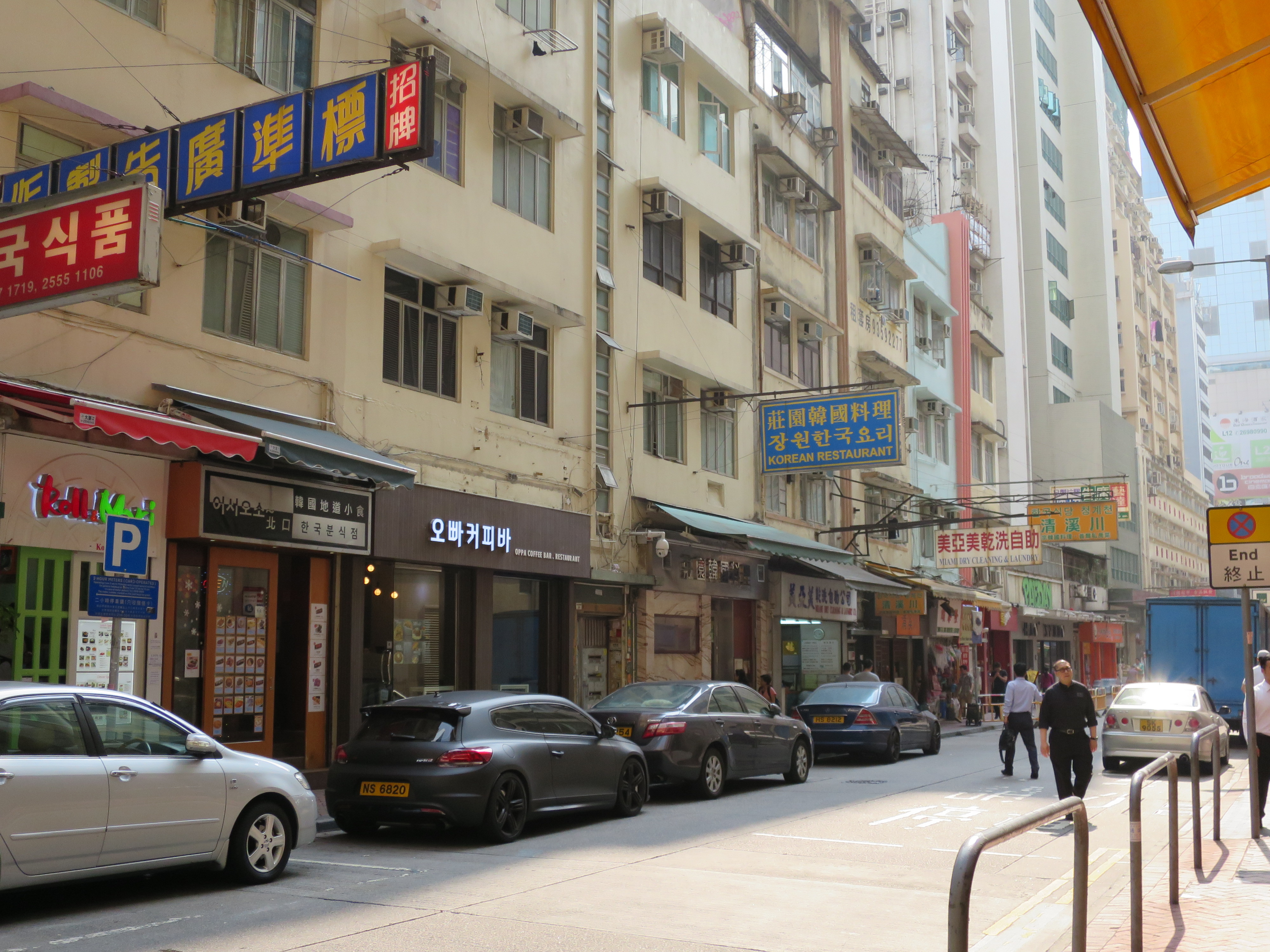
An overall view of Korean Street

Korean Street (Chinese: 韓國街), also known as Little Korea (Chinese: 小韓國), is a Koreatown in Hong Kong located primarily on Kimberley Street in Tsim Sha Tsui. A compact community of Koreans have lived in this area since the 1960s, and there is a concentration of Korean shops opened by Koreans, such as Korean restaurants and grocery stores. There are at least sixteen Korean food shops in Kimberly Street.

However, 90% of Korean Street customers are local Hong Kong people, the growing popularity of Korean culture in Hong Kong being driven by the 2005 Korean drama Dae Jang Geum, and more recently by 2014 drama My Love from the Star. The popularity of My Love from the Star has led to rents in the area to rise by over 40%. From Kimberley Street proper, Korean Street has expanded into the neighbouring Kimberley Road and Austin Road.

== Location ==
Starting from Kimberley Street which locates between Granville Road and Jimerberley Road and extending to the nearby streets which are Kimberley Road and Austin Road. The main entrance is the opposite of the back of The ONE shopping mall. "It is sandwiched between Granville Road and Kimberly Road."

== History ==
Before Kimberley Street became renowned for the Korean shops and restaurants, most of the street-level shops were hardware stores. There were already Korean shops, but most of them were upstairs shops.

Since the 1960s, trading activities between Hong Kong and Korea thrived and some Koreans started immigrating into Hong Kong. With a view to facilitating the Korean immigrants to buy the Korean supplies and providing public areas for them to reunion, some of the Korean immigrants opened some Korean grocery stores, cafés and restaurants. They located their shops in Kimberley Street since most of the Korean immigrants live in Tsim Sha Tsui and the transportation is convenient and comprehensive which allows easy access for the visitors.

The major visitors of Kimberley Street in the 1990s were the Korean immigrants. 80% of the customers was Korean. Yet, the target customers of the Korean shops have been altered from Korean immigrants into Hongkongers since the Korean television drama---Dae Jang Geum was broadcast in 2005. Thus more Korean shops were set up on Kimberley Street.

From 2011 onwards, the K-pop culture reached social media, e.g. YouTube and K-pop videos were viewed nearly 2.3 billion times worldwide. This boosted the popularity of Kimberley Street. Today, Kimberley Street is more prominent than before and becomes one of the tourist spots in Hong Kong. The scope of Korean Street expands to the nearby Kimberley Road and Austin Road due to the skyrocketing popularity of Korean culture.

== Features ==
=== Korean grocery stores ===
Korean grocery stores is sometimes known as the Korean supermarket and they are very popular for Korean household products. The operation time of the shops is around 10 a.m. to around 9 p.m. The several shops found in Tsim Sha Tsui offer fresh produce, seasonings, drinks, soju, beer, frozen foods, pre-made side-dishes, dumplings, snacks, candies, ice cream, and even household products.

=== Korean snack stores ===
These Korean stores, which sell traditional Korean snacks, such as kimbap, kimchi, traditional sauces in Tsim Sha Tsui, are mainly manage by Korean. The operation method is like a takeaway snack bar.

=== Korean restaurants ===
Although the Korean Street is short in Tsim Sha Tsui, it has opened at least 20 Korean restaurants. Those restaurants provide traditional Korean barbecue, hot pot, Korean snacks, Korean fusion dishes, For example, kimchi hot pot, kimbap, stuffed pig intestines, green bean cake, kimchi ramen.

== Gallery ==
Korean food stores

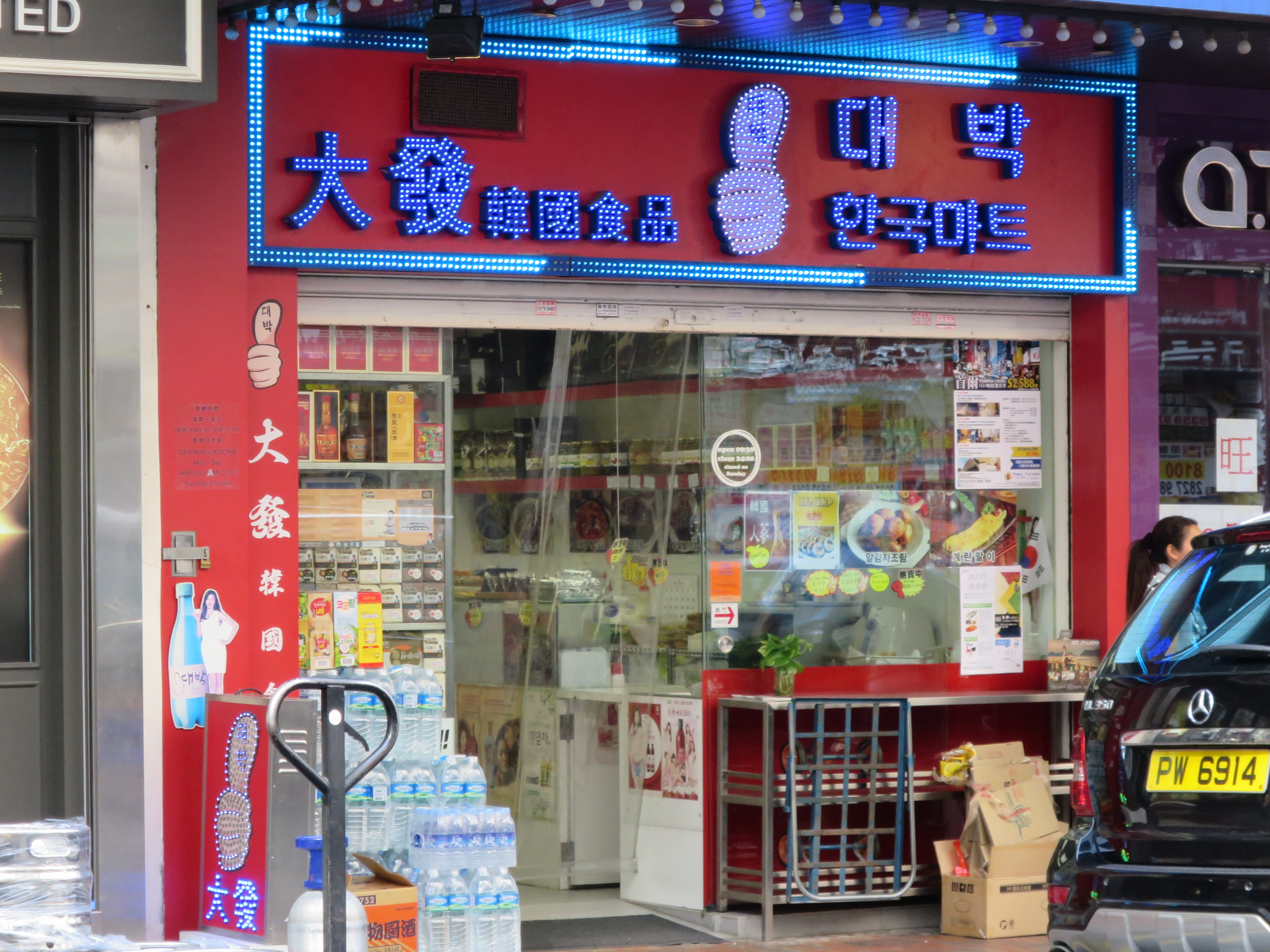
Korean snacks and drinks.

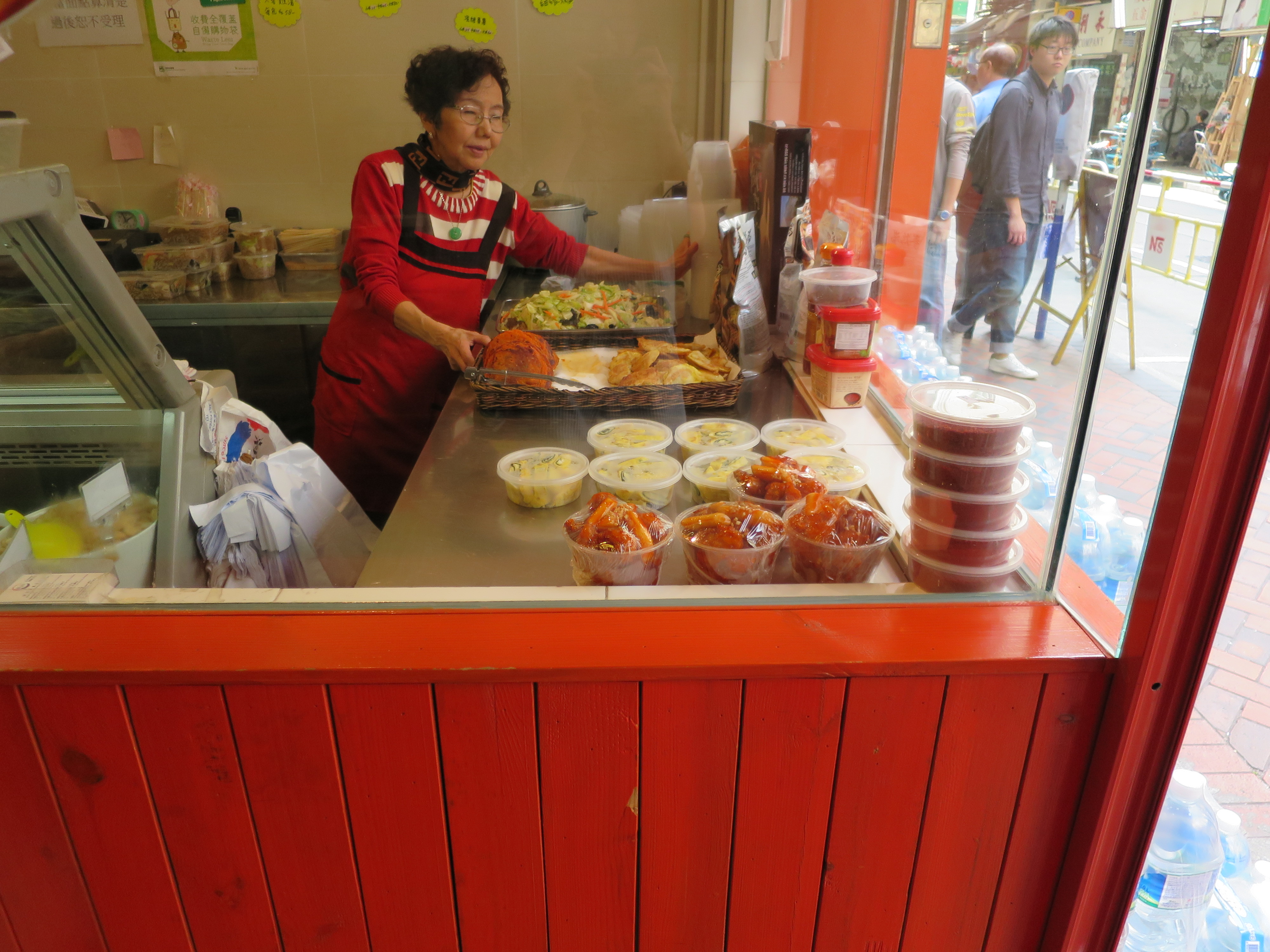
Kim-chi, Korean sushi and Korean pickled food.

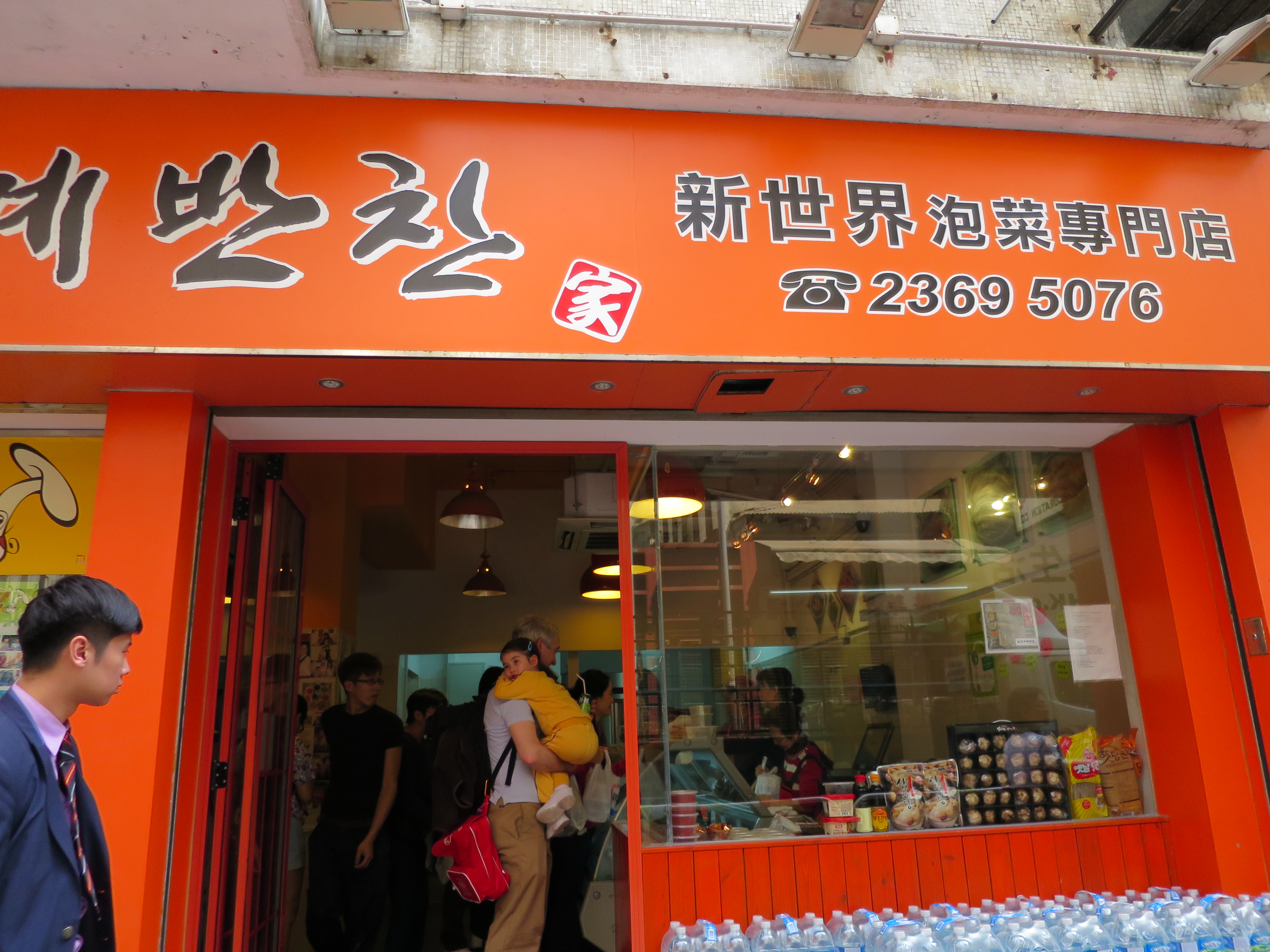

Korean restaurants

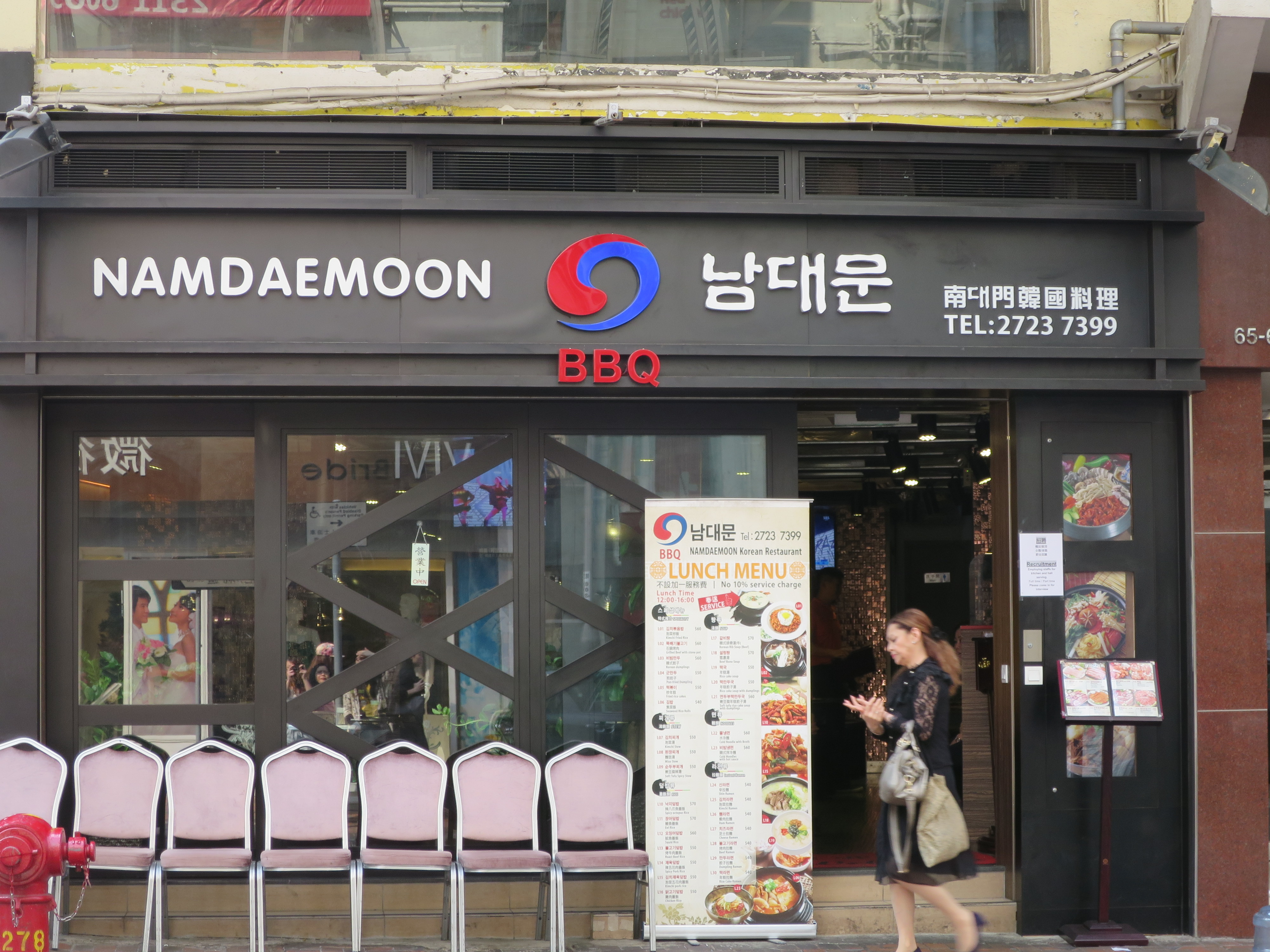
Korean BBQ food.

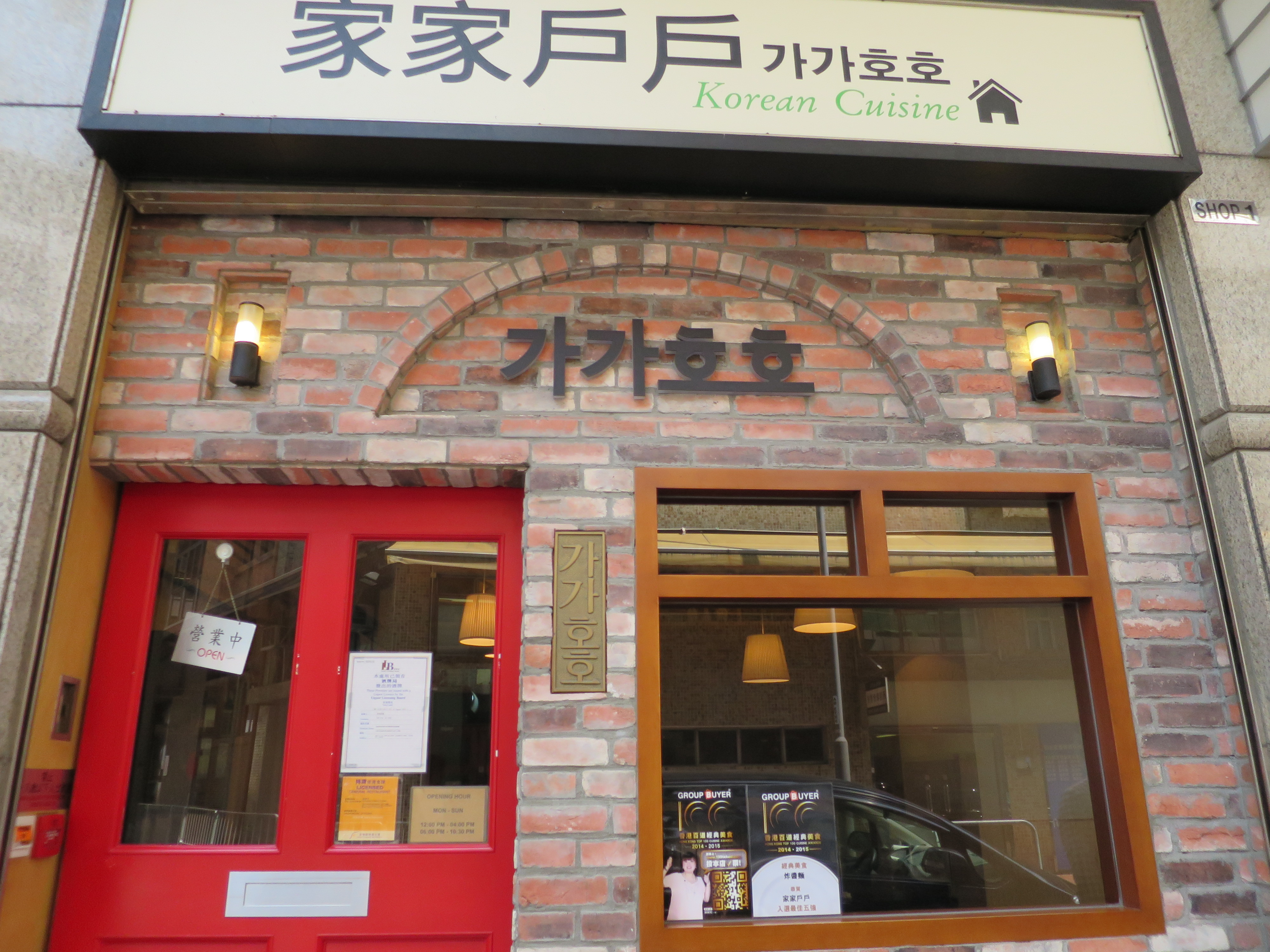
Local Korean food.

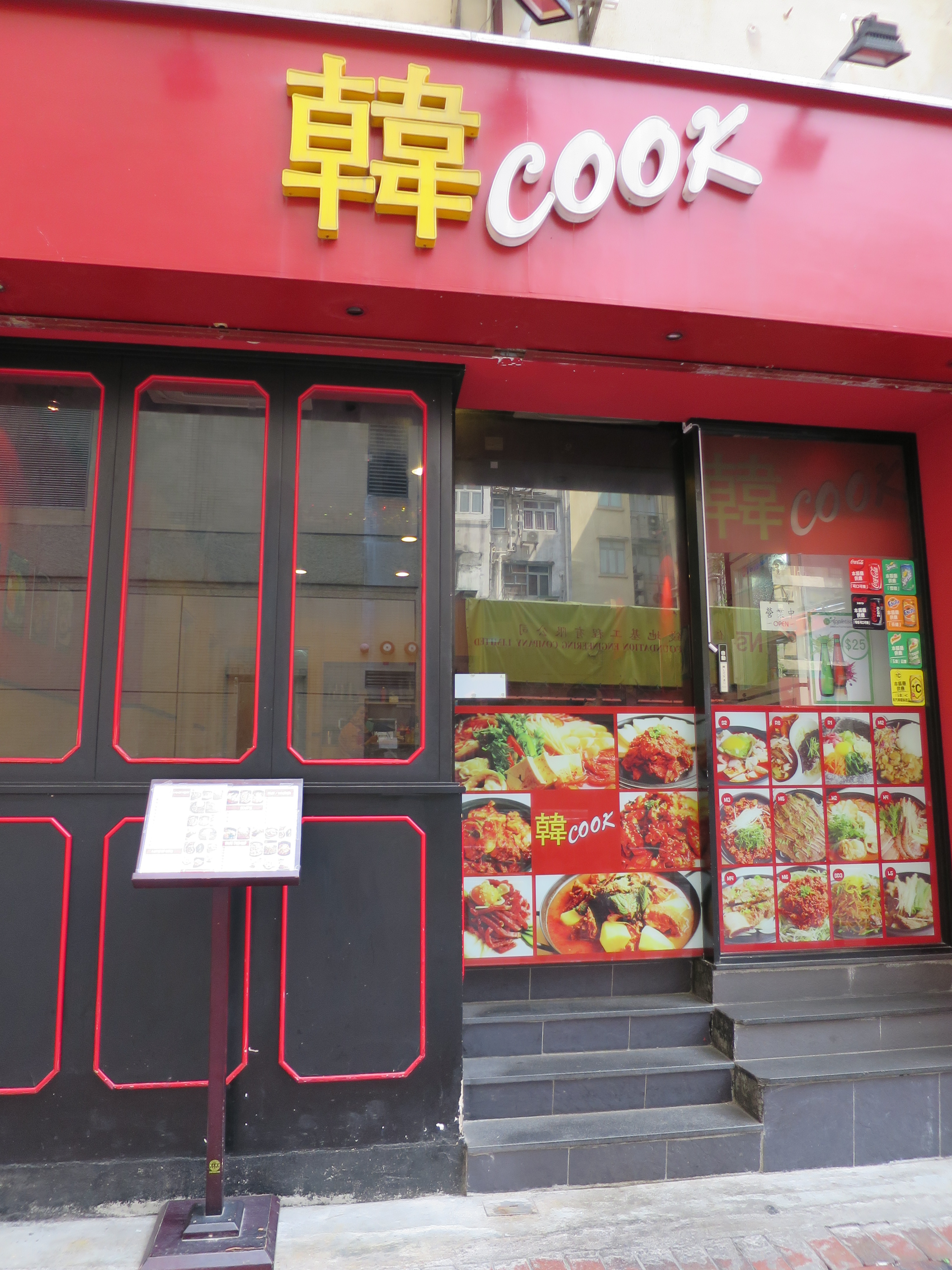
Local Korean food.

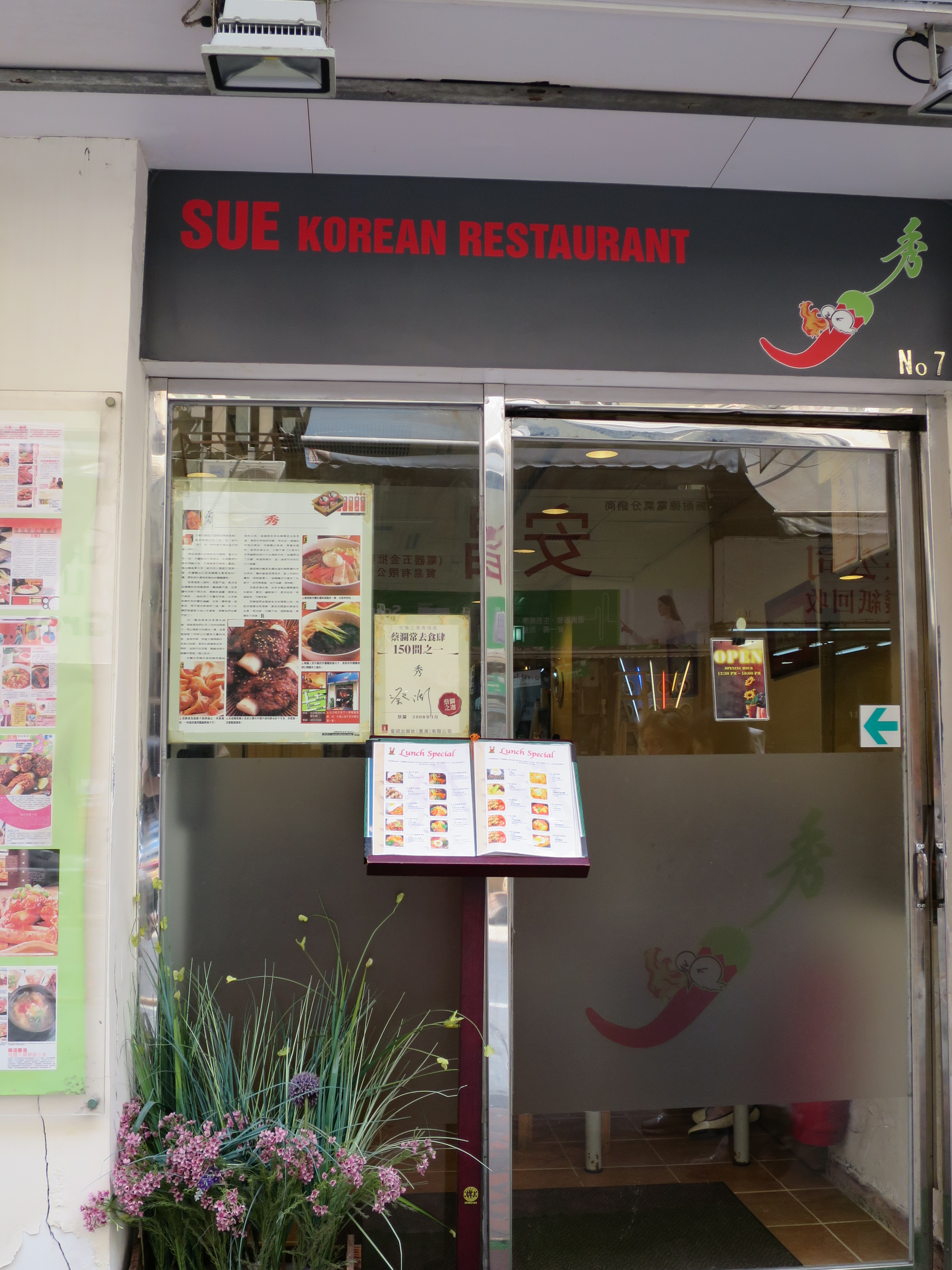
Spicy Korean food.

Korean grocery stores

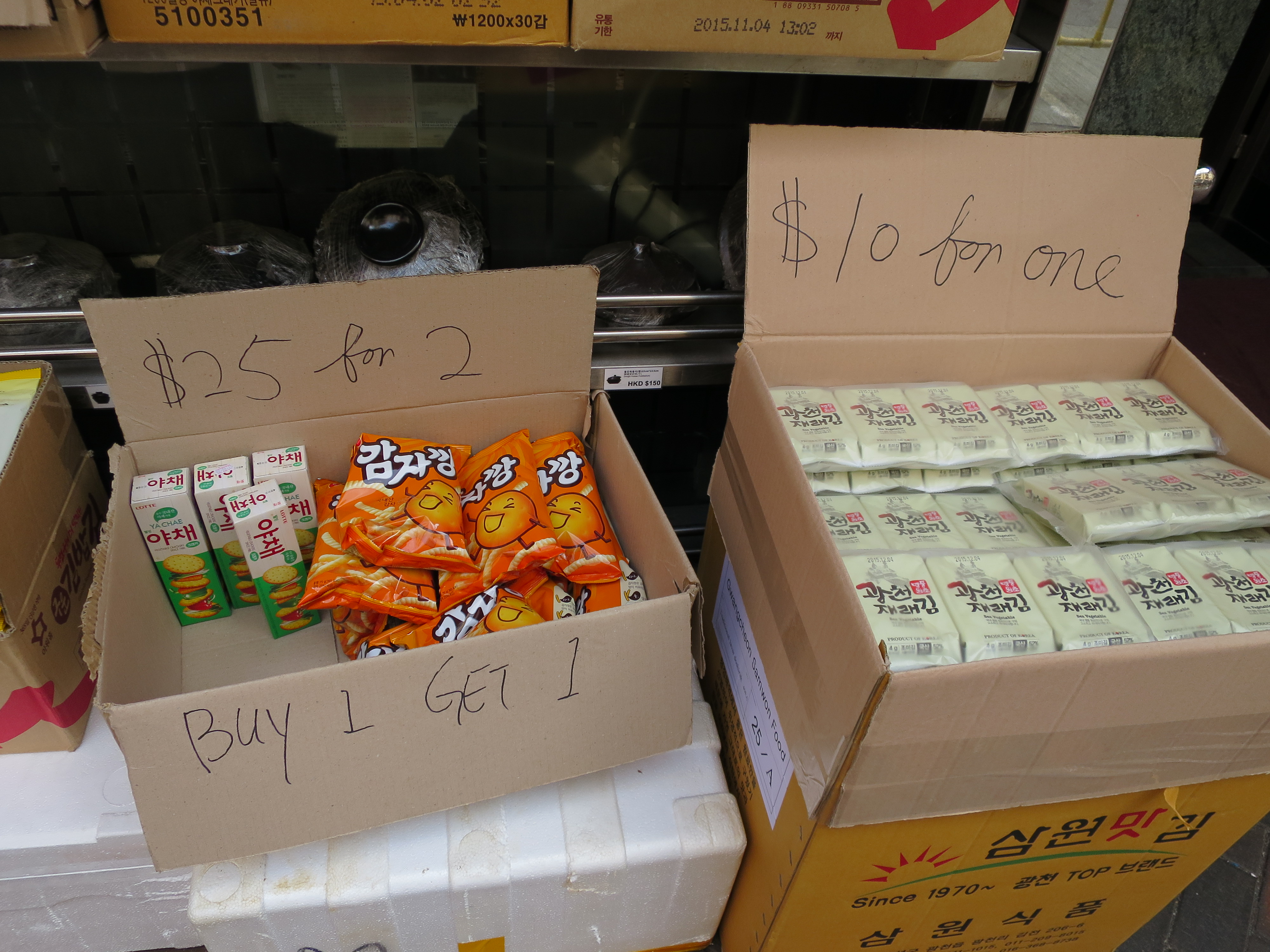
Korean drinks, seasonings and groceries.

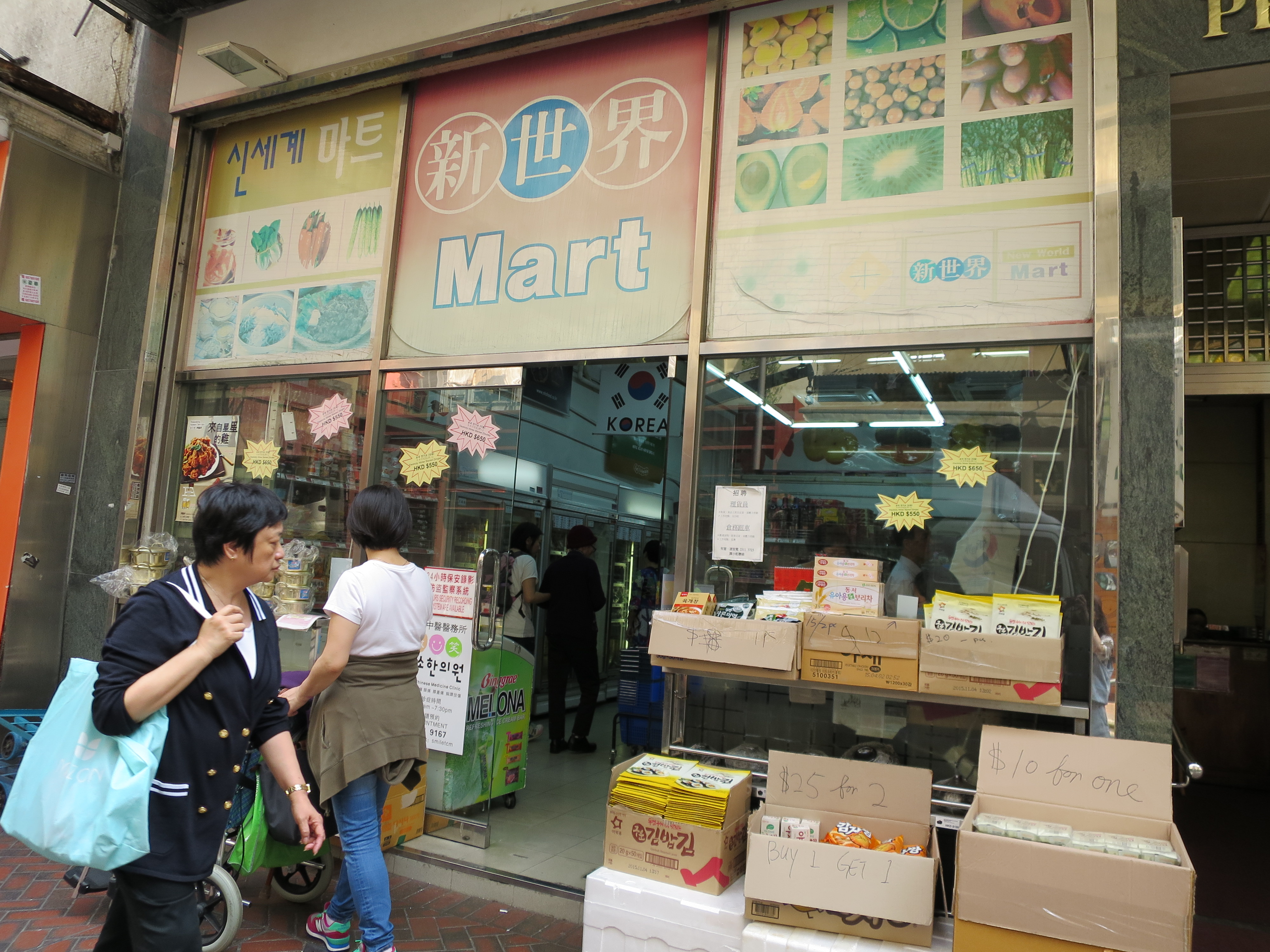

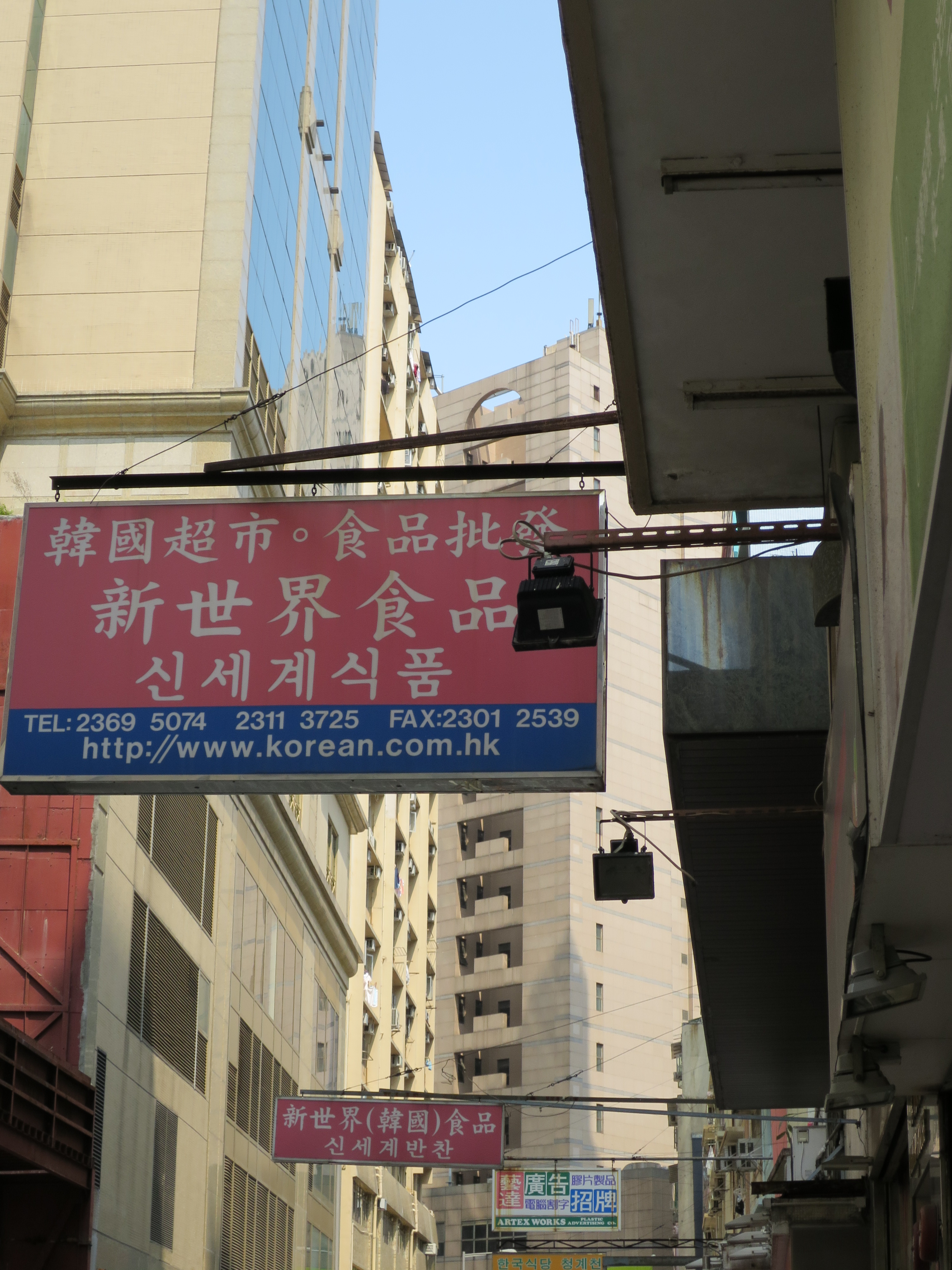

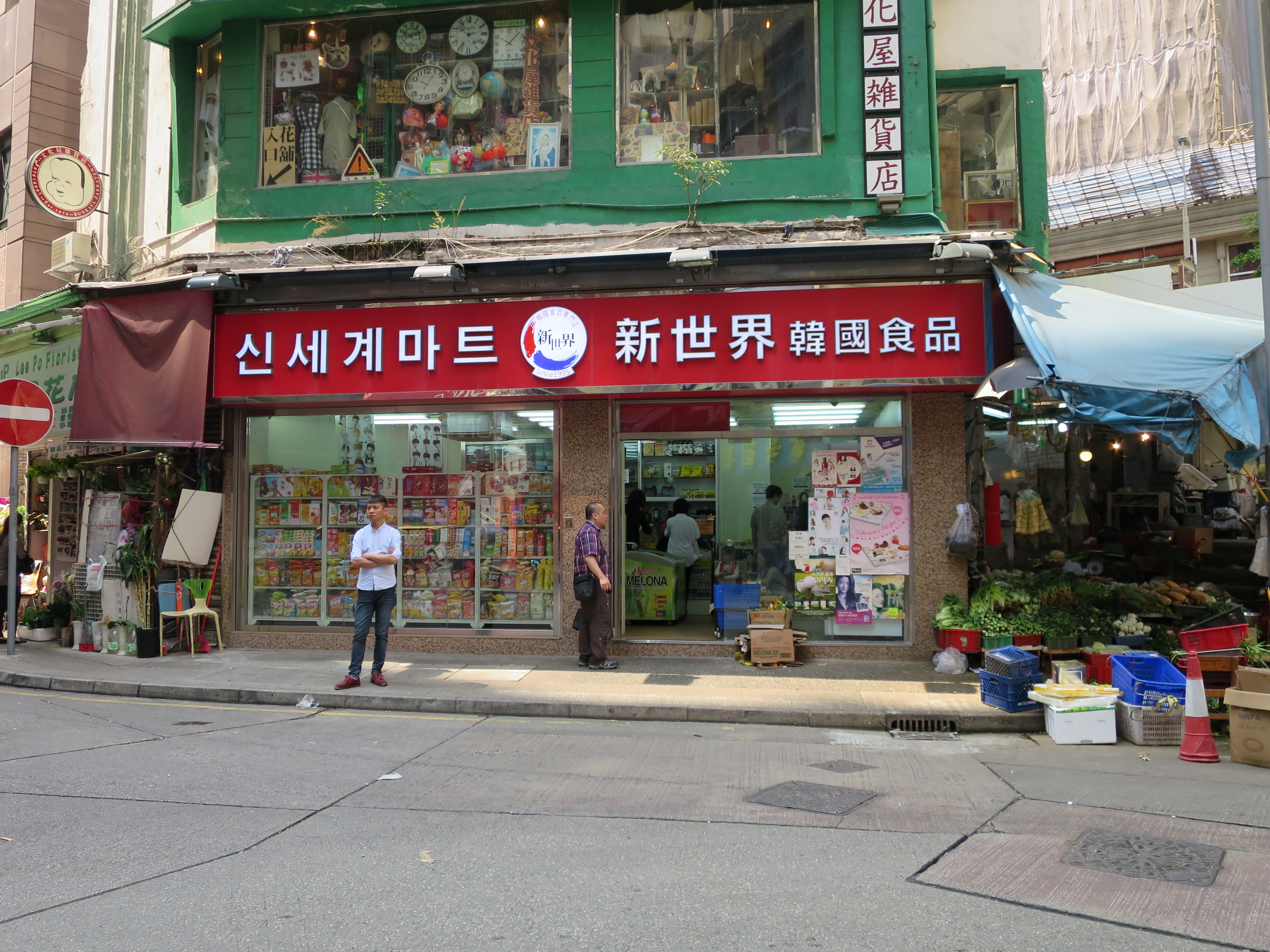
Stores sell some Korean drinks, seasonings and groceries.

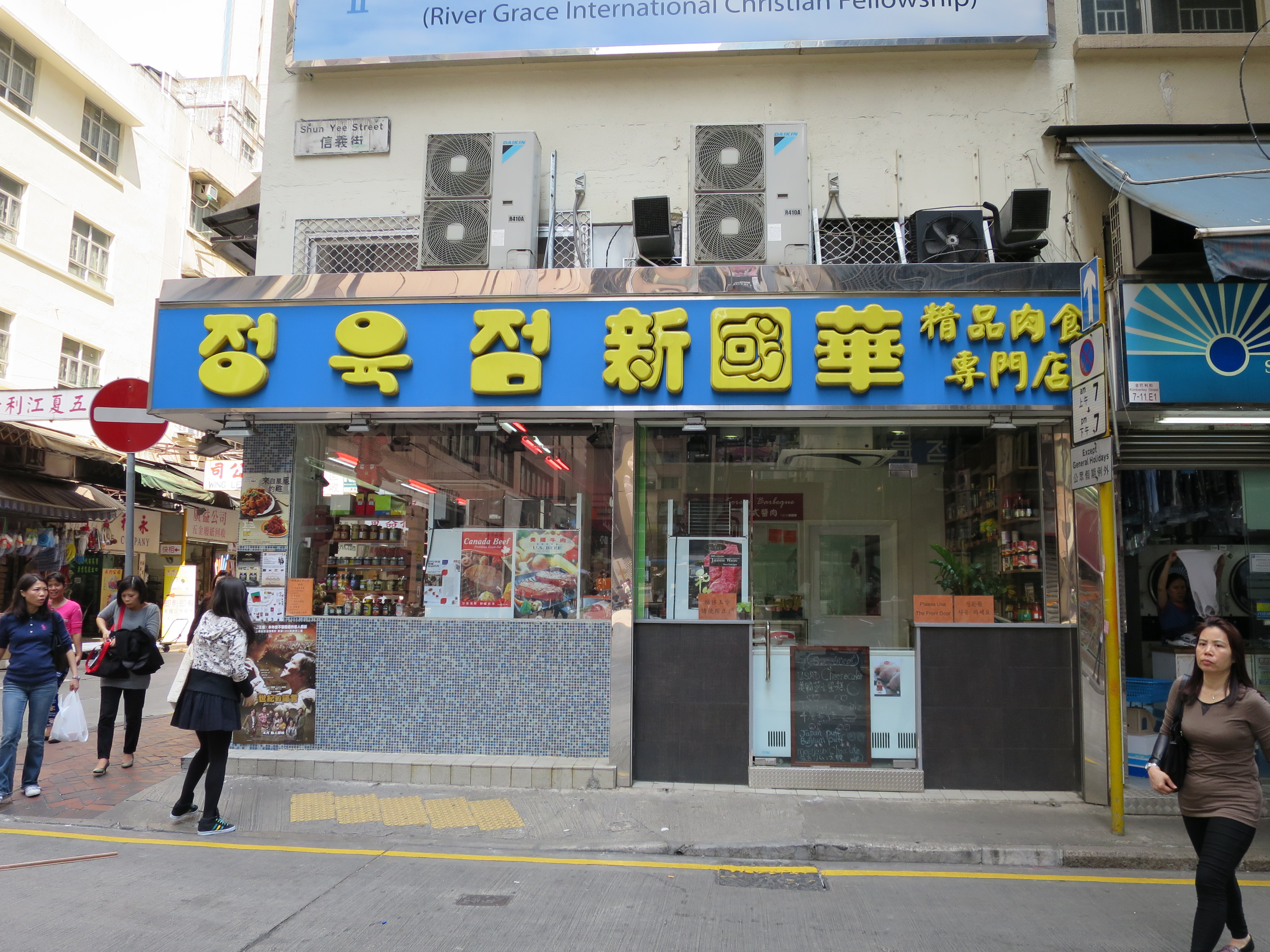
One of the Korean Frozen Meat Store provides mainly raw and frozen meat from Korea.

== Public transport ==
From the Tsim Sha Tsui MTR station, take Exit B1 and walk up Nathan Road to The ONE. From there, walk down Granville Road, and turn up Carnarvon Road just in back of The ONE. You will find the entrance to Kimberley Street on the right.

== See also ==
- Korean Street Guangzhou
- Koreans in Hong Kong
