= Cameron Road =

Road in Hong Kong, China

Coordinates: 22.29941°N 114.17454°E

Cameron Road 金馬倫道
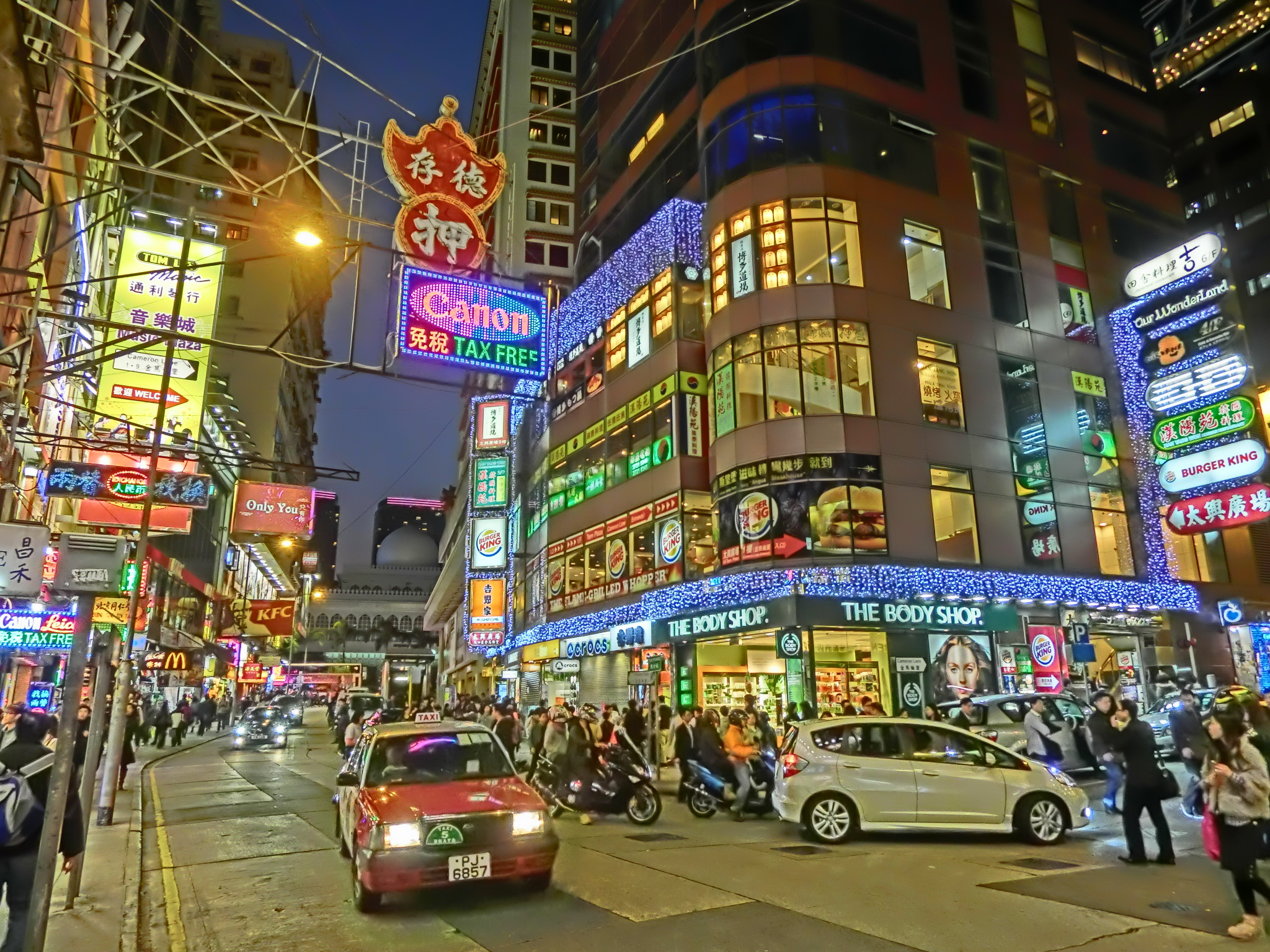
- Cameron Road at night in March 2013.
- Traditional Chinese: 金馬倫道
- Simplified Chinese: 金马伦道
Transcriptions
Standard Mandarin
- Hanyu Pinyin: JīnMǎlun Dao
Yue: Cantonese
- Jyutping: gam1 maa5 leon4 dou6

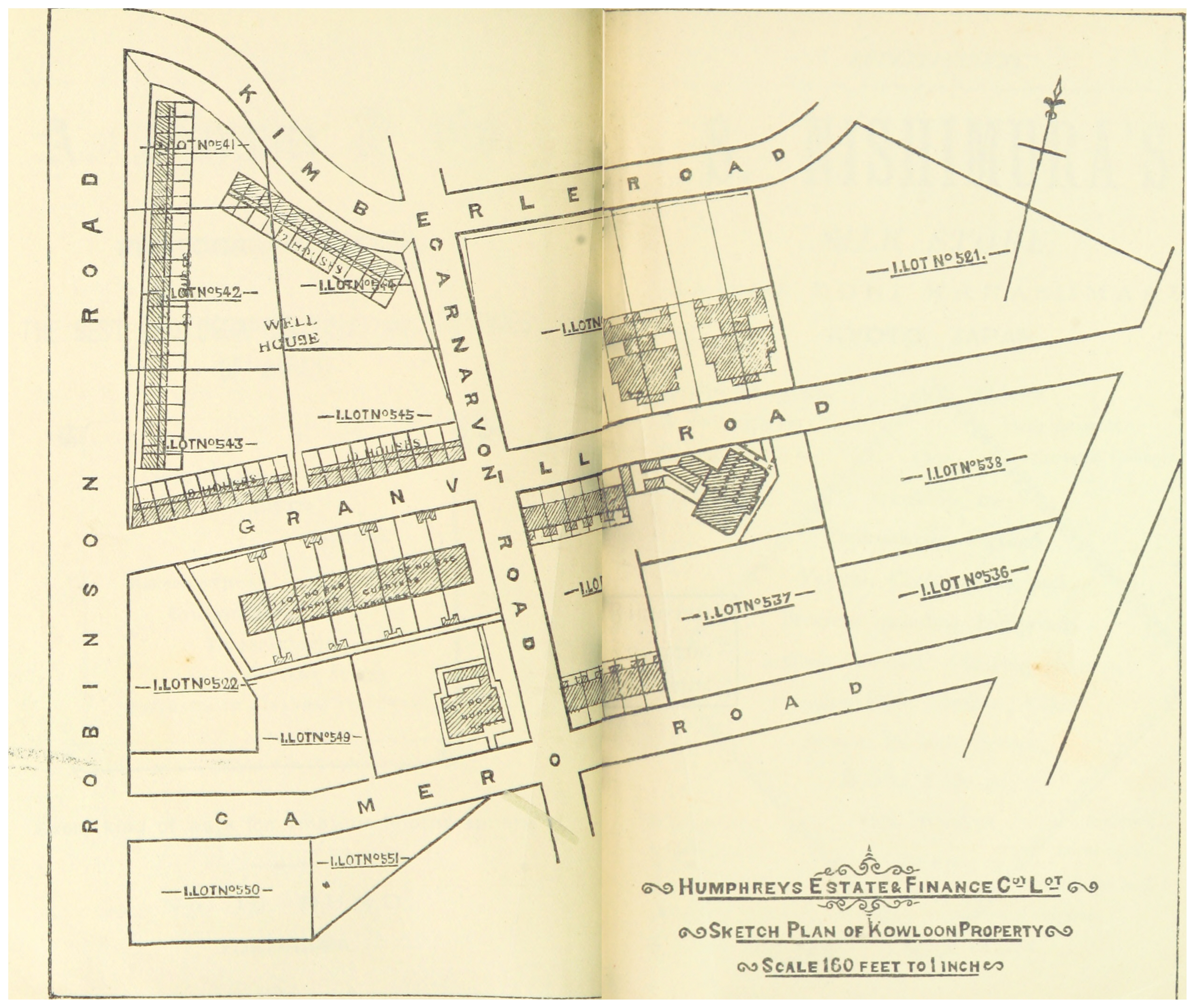
1897 map of the area east of Nathan Road (then called "Robinson Road"), including Kimberley Road, Granville Road, Carnarvon Road and Cameron Road.

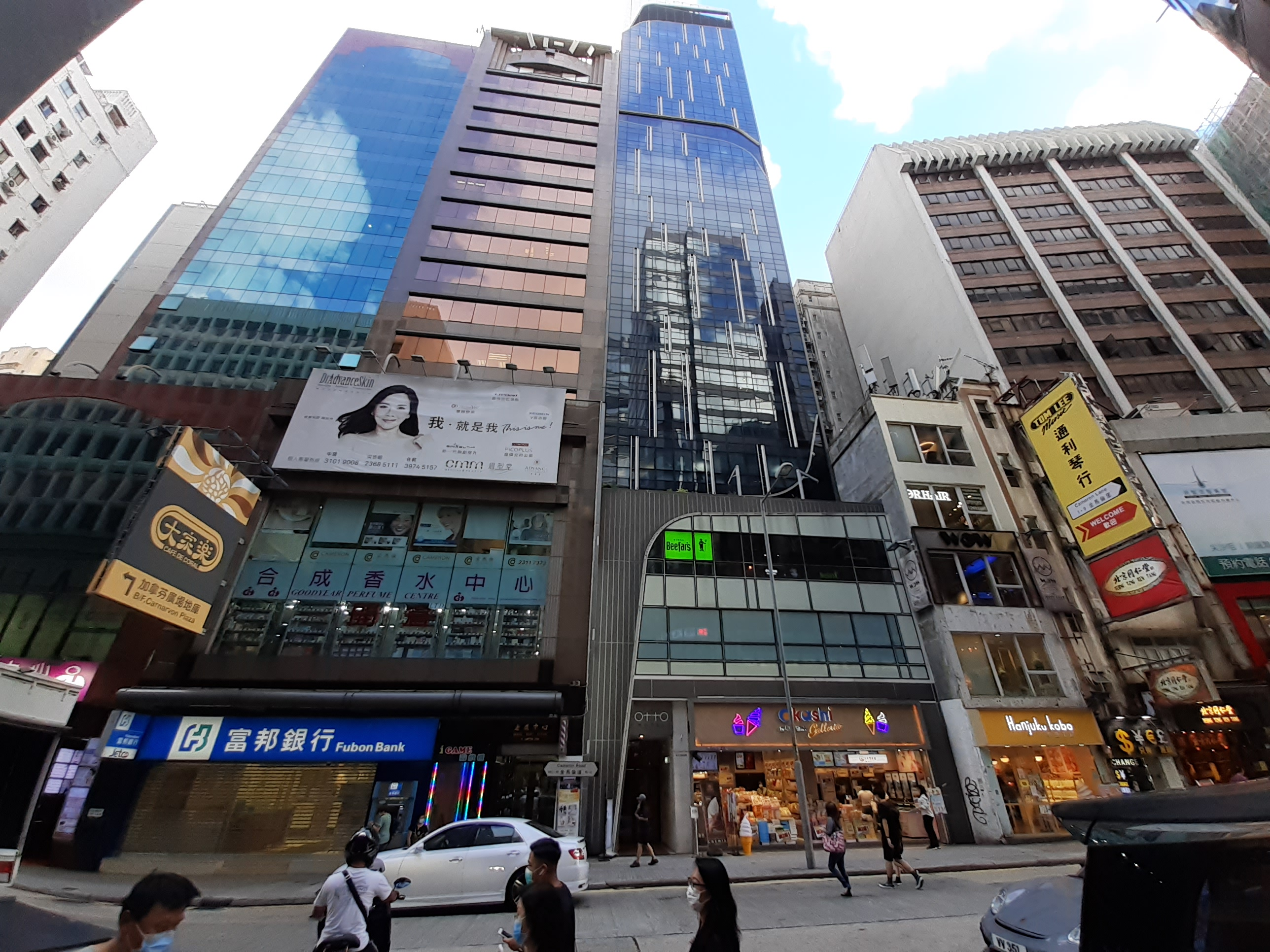
Cameron Road in 2020.

Cameron Road (Chinese: 金馬倫道) is a street in Tsim Sha Tsui, Kowloon, Hong Kong.

== Location ==
The west end of Cameron Road is Nathan Road while the east end is Chatham Road South, and it is almost parallel to Granville Road and Mody Road.

== Name ==
Cameron Road is named after Major General William Gordon Cameron, the Administrator of Hong Kong from April to October 1887.

== Shopping ==
The area east of Nathan Road, comprising Cameron Road, Granville Road and Carnarvon Road has been described as having "teeming shops" and likely the main reason that Hong Kong acquired the "shopping paradise" tag, a phrase first put into print in an ironic manner by author Han Suyin, in her 1952 novel A Many-Splendoured Thing.

== In popular culture ==
The 2003 Johnnie To movie PTU is partly set in Cameron Road. While the final shootout sequence of the film takes place in Canton Road, To reportedly said that "if there was a single location where he would have wanted to stage a gunfight battle, it was Cameron Road, but he could not get permission from the police to do it". The sequence was actually shot in Ap Lei Chau.

== See also ==
- List of streets and roads in Hong Kong
