= Korean Street Guangzhou =

Street in Guangzhou, China

Korean Street Guangzhou is a street located in Yuanjing Road, Guangzhou, China whose residents consist mainly of nationals from the Republic of Korea.

== Background ==
The street is built naturally, it is first a few Korean stores to satisfy the Koreans residing at the road. However, the street government found out there are commercial opportunities here, then they create the requirements for the Korean Street. And then many Koreans come to Yuanjing Rd for investments and so long the Korean Street is done.

== See also ==
- Korean Street, Hong Kong
