= Tung Ying Building =

Building in Kowloon, Hong Kong

Coordinates: 22.2996°N 114.1722°E

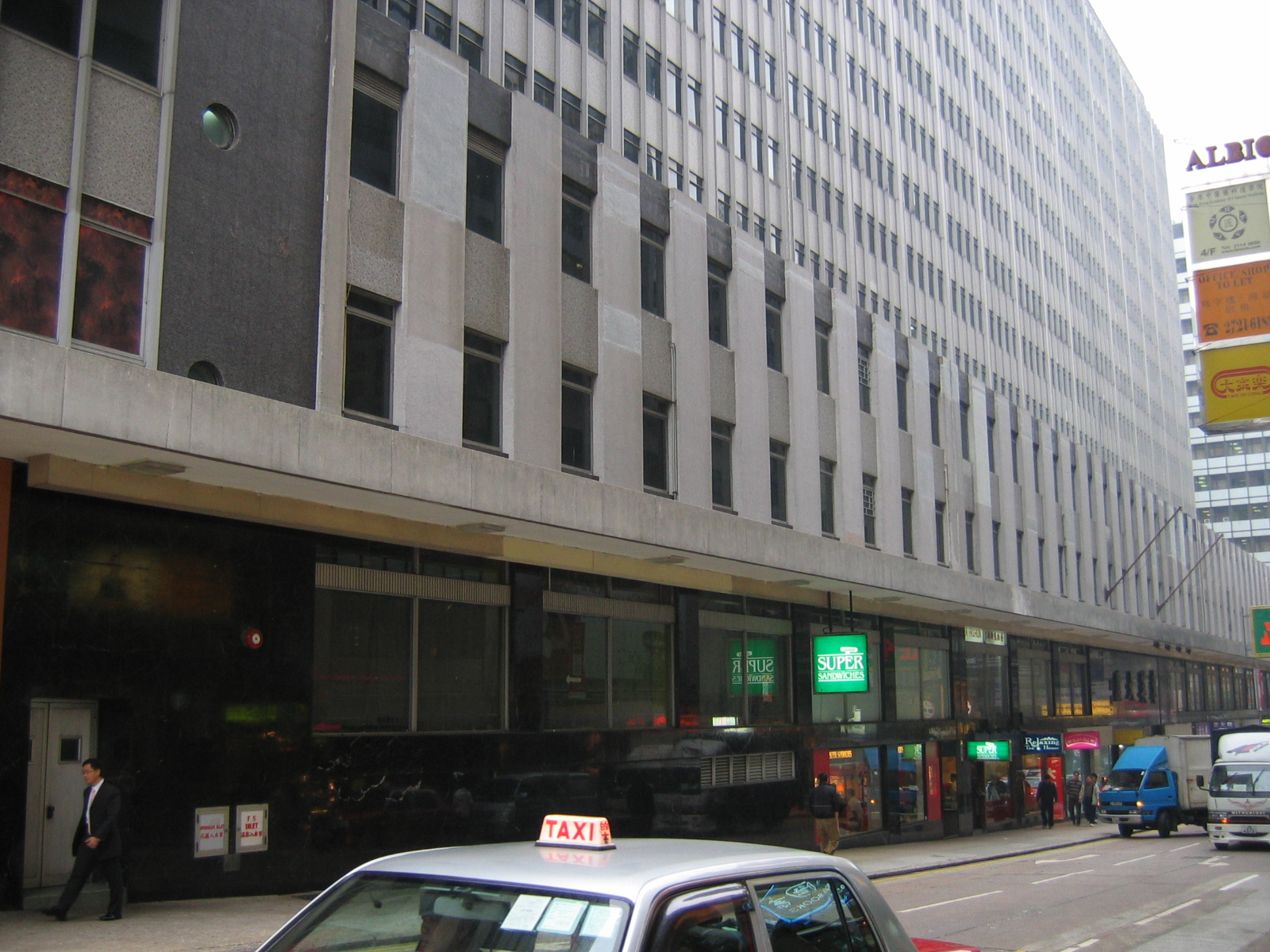
- Tung Ying Building in 2006.
- Traditional Chinese: 東英大廈
- Simplified Chinese: 东英大厦
Transcriptions
Standard Mandarin
- Hanyu Pinyin: Dōng Yīng Dàshà
Yue: Cantonese
- Jyutping: dung1 jing1 daai6 haa6

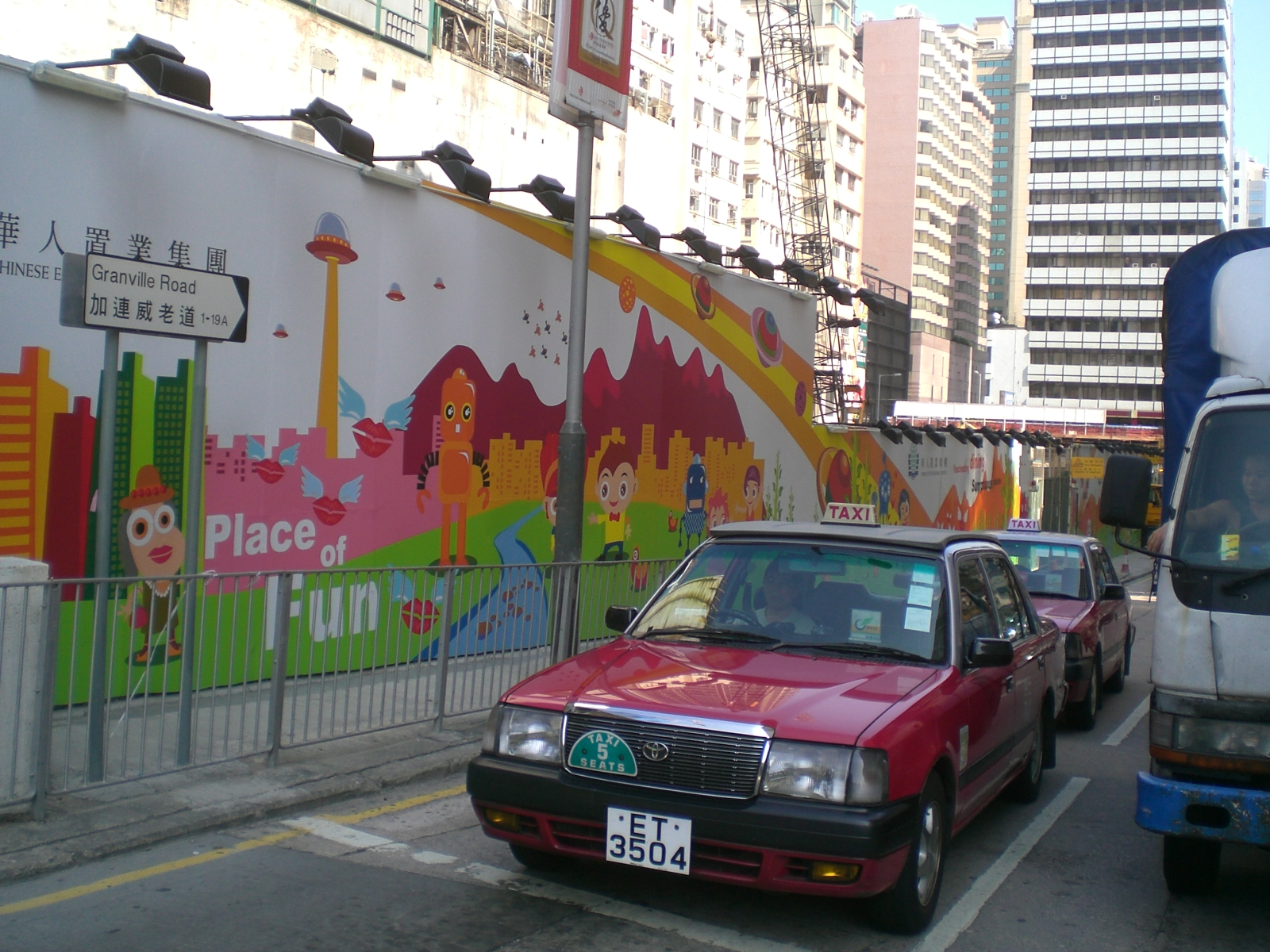
After demolition.

Tung Ying Building (Chinese: 東英大廈) was a 17-storey office building and shopping centre at 100 Nathan Road, at the corner of Granville Road in Tsim Sha Tsui, Kowloon, Hong Kong.

It was built in the 1960s and its style of architecture had become rare in Hong Kong. It was named after the given name of Sir Robert Hotung and his wife. A statue of Sir Robert was located at the ground floor of the building.

It was once the will of the Hotung family not to sell the building. But after his grandson died the family sold it, and the new owner has decided to redevelop.

Chinese Estates Holdings has announced plans to spend up to $1 billion demolishing the 39-year-old Tung Ying Building and turning it into a commercial complex. Demolition work on the Tung Ying Building started in early 2006 and the redevelopment of the site as The ONE shopping centre was completed in 2009/2010.
