= The One (shopping centre) =

Shopping mall in Tsim Sha Tsui, Hong Kong

Coordinates: 22.2998°N 114.1724°E

The ONE

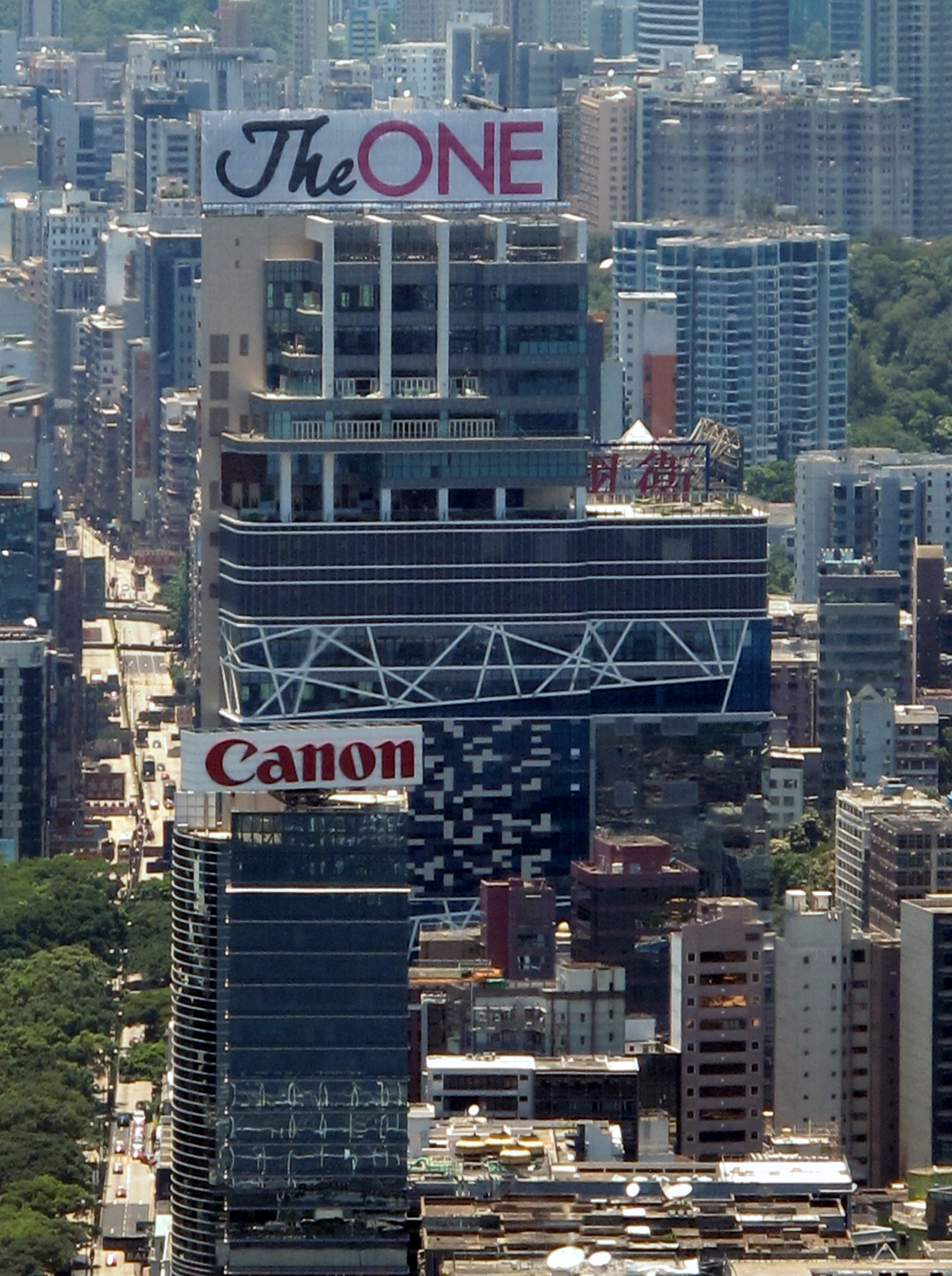
- The ONE shopping centre
- Location: Tsim Sha Tsui, Hong Kong, at the junction of Carnarvon and Granville Roads
- Address: 100 Nathan Road, Tsim Sha Tsui, Hong Kong
- Opened: 29 October 2010; 16 years ago
- Developer: Chinese Estates Holdings
- Manager: Chinese Estates Holdings
- Architect: Paul Noritaka Tange
- Num. of stores: 130
- Floor area: 400,000 square feet (37,000 m^{2})
- Floors: 23
- Website: The ONE

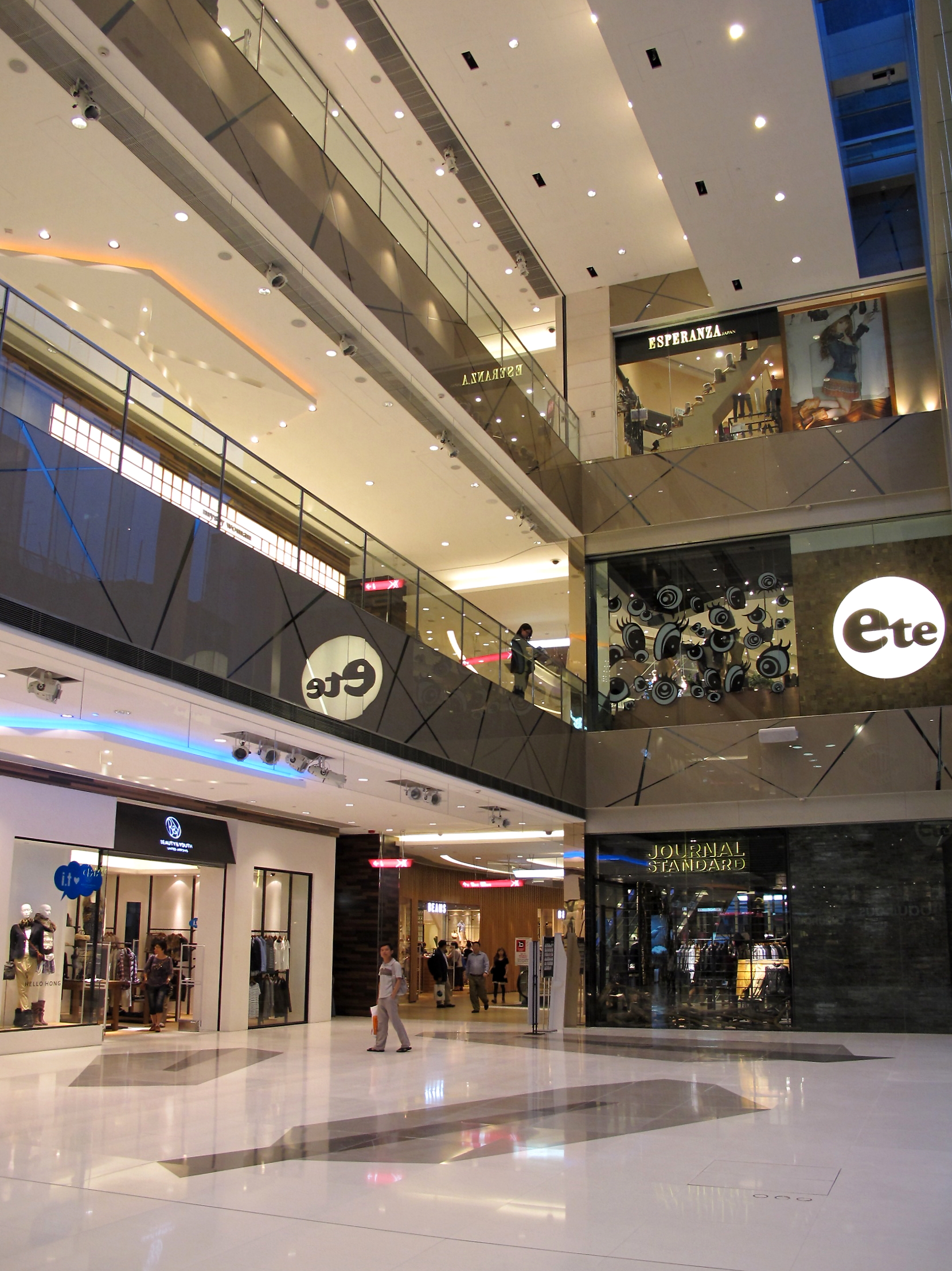
Atrium of The ONE

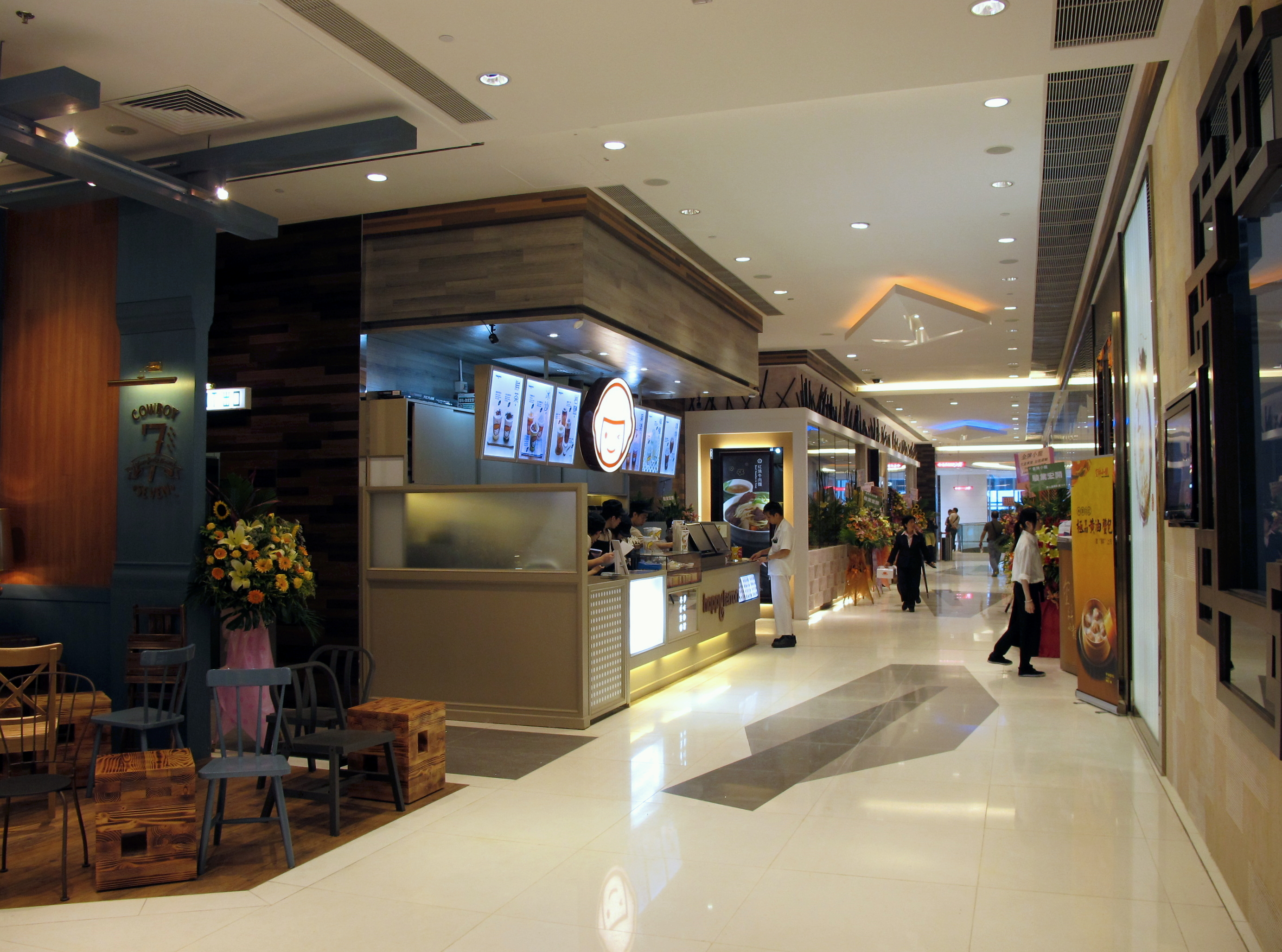
Level 4 Restaurants

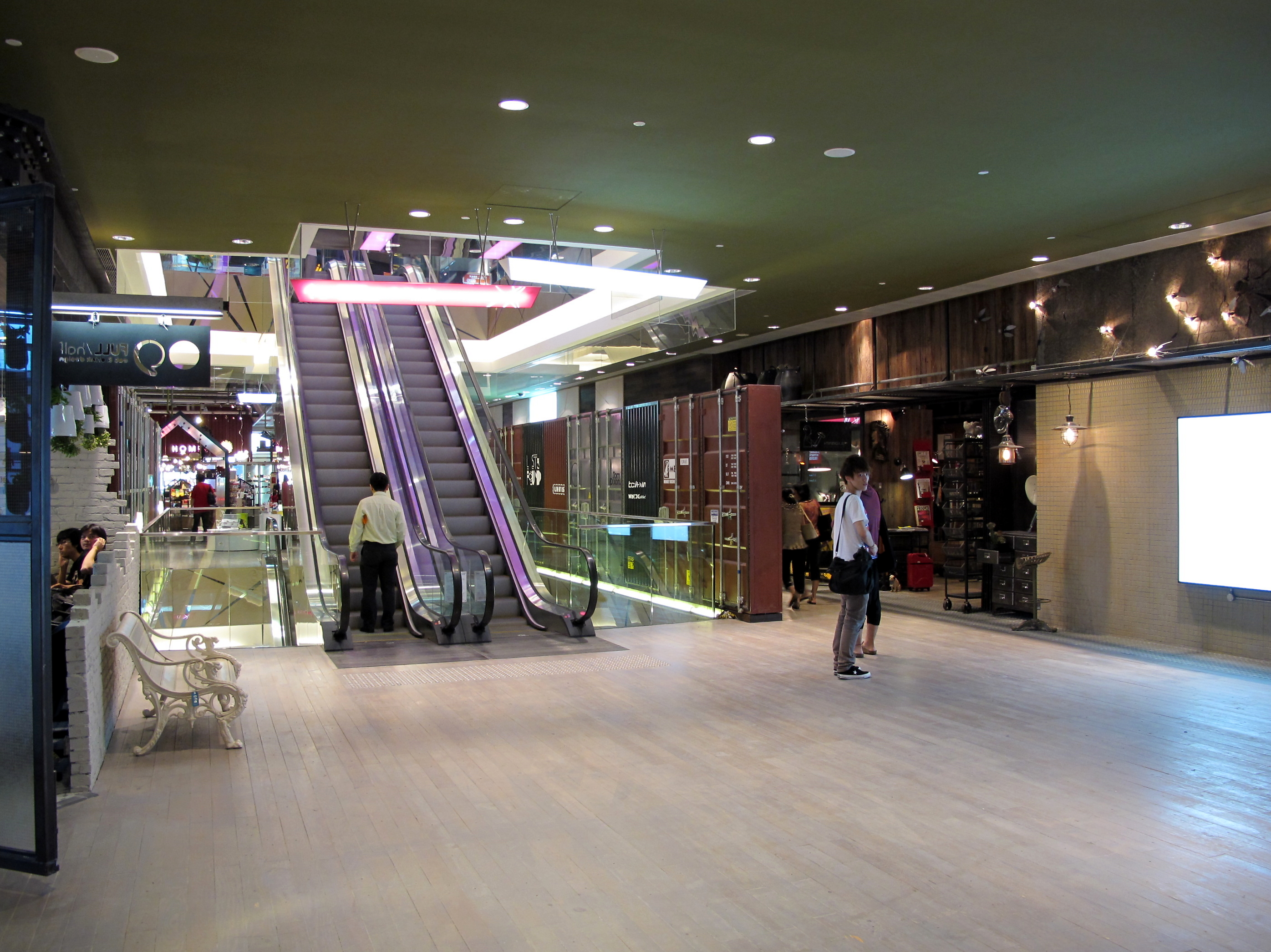
8th floor

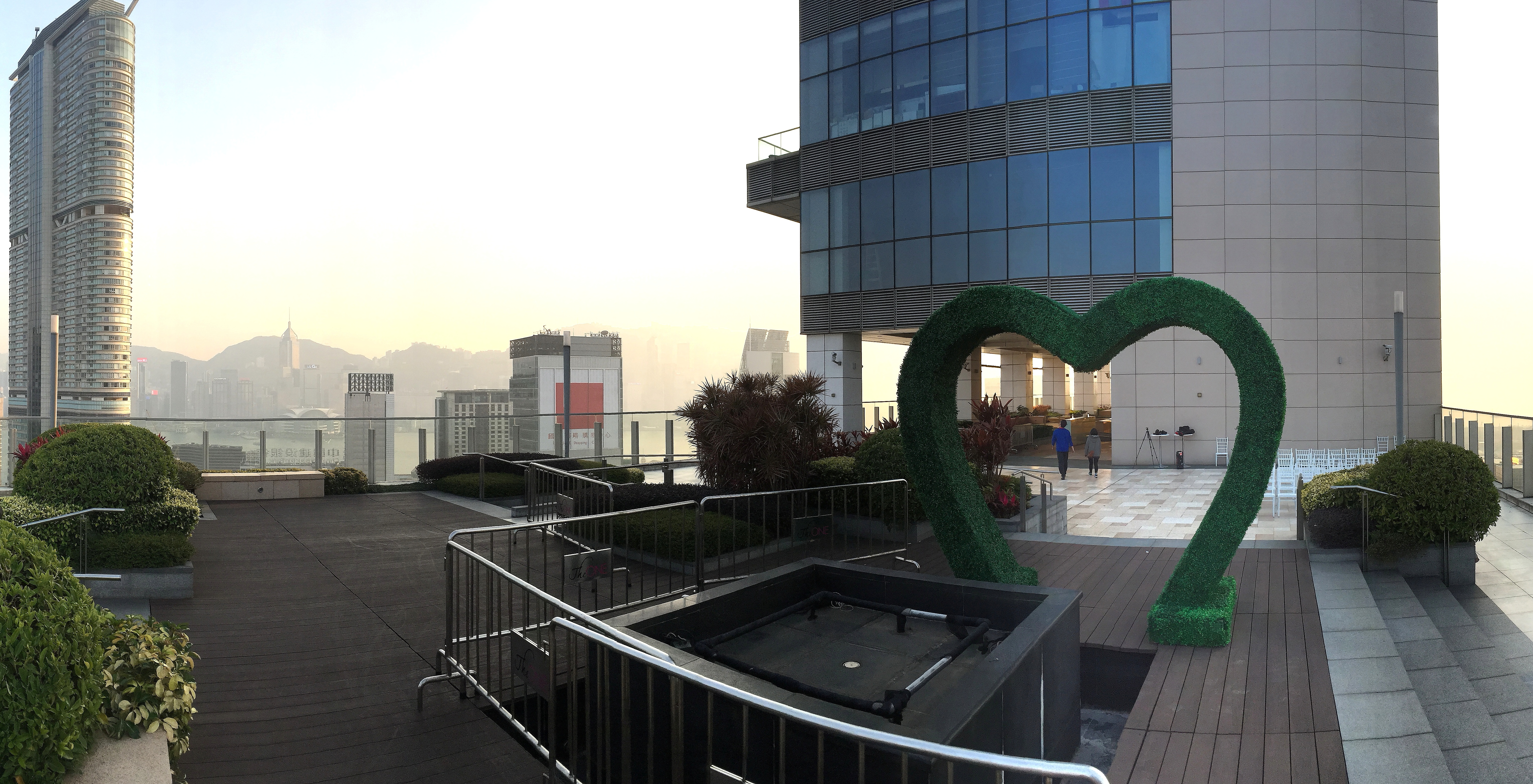
16th Sky Garden

The ONE is a shopping centre in Tsim Sha Tsui, Kowloon, Hong Kong. It is built on the site of the former Tung Ying Building at 100 Nathan Road. It was developed by Chinese Estates Holdings and opened in 2010. Owner Joseph Lau Luen-hung gifted the property to his wife in 2017.

== History ==
The current site of The One used to be occupied by Tung Ying Building. During the economic recession in 2003, it was sold to Chinese Estates Holdings Limited for HK$1.1 Billion. The company then decided to spend HK$2.5 Billion for reconstruction of the whole building, construction work started to take place after demolishing it during August 2006. The One was completed on 16 June 2009.

== Overview ==
The One is a 29-storey building with a total construction are of 400,000 sq ft (37,000 m^{2}), consisting of shops and a cinema. It is erected vertically towards the sky consisting a variety of shops. It is one of the tallest retail only buildings in the world.

Exterior construction was topped out on 22 December 2009 and was completed in May 2010. The mall officially opened on 29 October that year.

== Floor layout ==
Apart from L16, The One is open to the public.

LG2

LG2 was originally named "Digital One Zone". When the mall first opened, it was leased to major tenants related to technology such as Fotomax. However, on 18 June 2011, the site changed to JUSCO MaxValu Prime supermarket.

LG1: Trends

When the shopping mall first opened, this floor was totally empty. It was not until December 2010 when stalls and temporary stalls were set up there. In January 2011, it then changed to JUSCO Exhibition stalls, and later on changed to JUSCO MaxValu Prime supermarket, covering an area of approximately 28,000 sq ft (2,600 m^{2}). Fast food outlets were also set up, including Okinawa Route 58, The Cocoa Trees, and Tutti Frutti.

G-UG2: Fashion

L1-L3: Popular clothing and accessories

L1-L3's targeting group are females. Major tenants includes Cobo, Frmac Qui, Bla Bla Bra and Tee Locker. There are also two fast food outlets and also the Frozen Yogurt store Tuttimelon.

L4-L5: International Cuisine

There is a large variety of international cuisine on L4 and L5, but Asian cuisine in particular.

L6-L11: Lifestyle stores

L12-13: Restaurants

12th Floor: East Ocean Seafood Restaurant

13th Floor: Palace Wedding Chinese Restaurant

L16: Garden Terrace

The Garden Terrace covers over an area of 10,000 ft^{2} (930 m^{2}). Its original intention was to let the public view the Hong Kong skyline, including Victoria Harbour, Tsim Sha Tsui and Kowloon East. However, not long after completion it was only accessible by leasing for special occasions.

L17-L21: High-class Cuisine

== Criticisms ==
Exterior LED Lights causing Light pollution

The Environmental Protection Department received 5 complaints about the strong LED lights from the exterior of The ONE, and not switching off until 4 am, causing nearby residents unable to sleep. The management company later on decided to switch off lights of the billboard on the southern side of The ONE at 9 pm and then the northern side at 11 pm.

== Construction photos ==
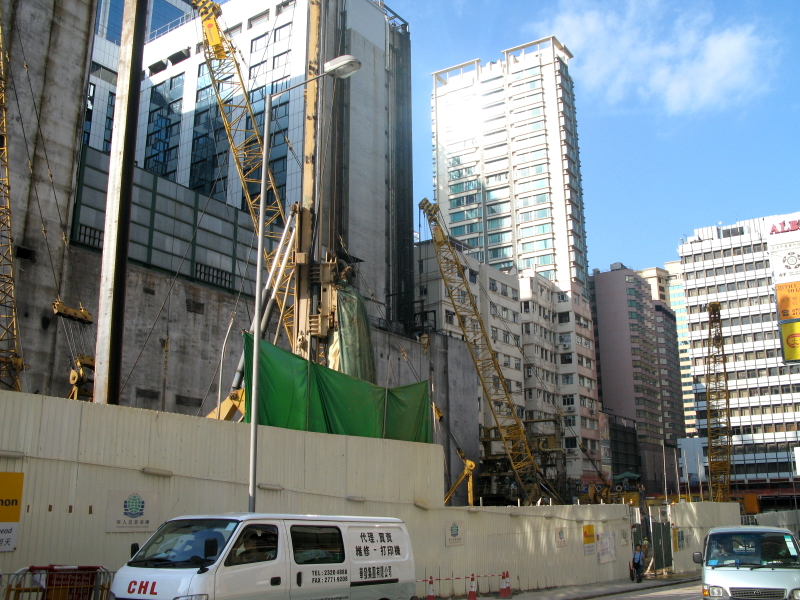
May 2007

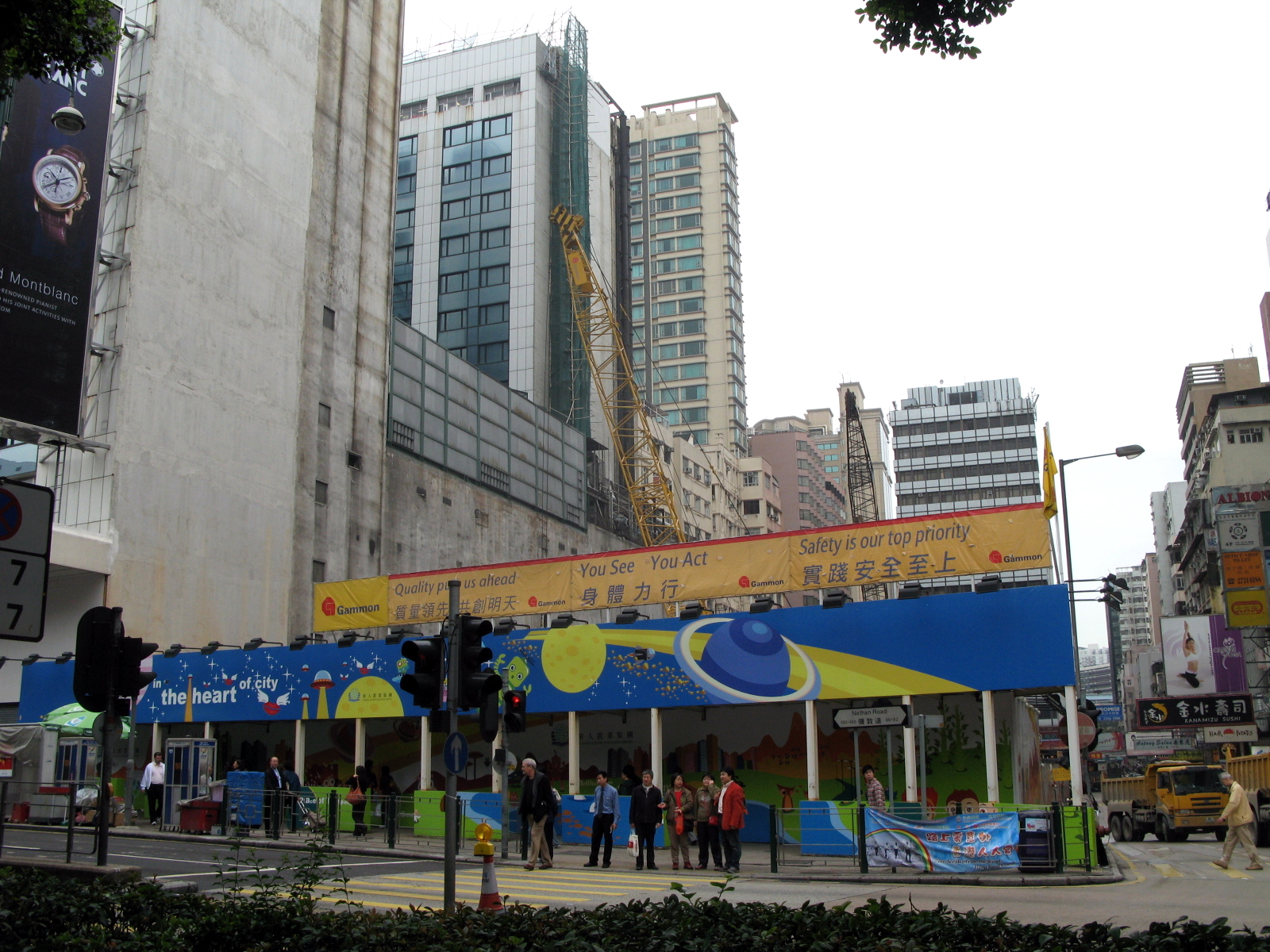
February 2008

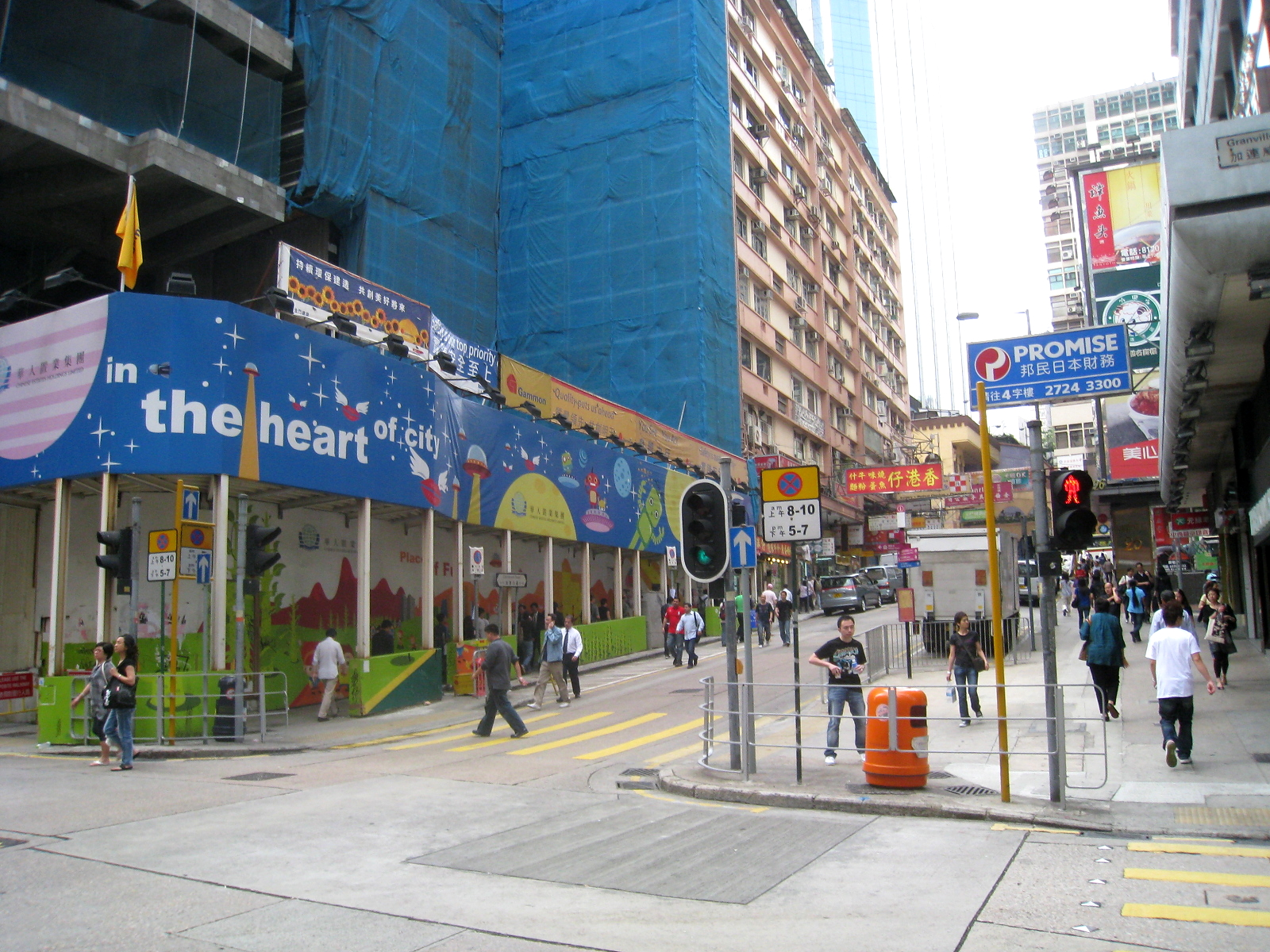
May 2009

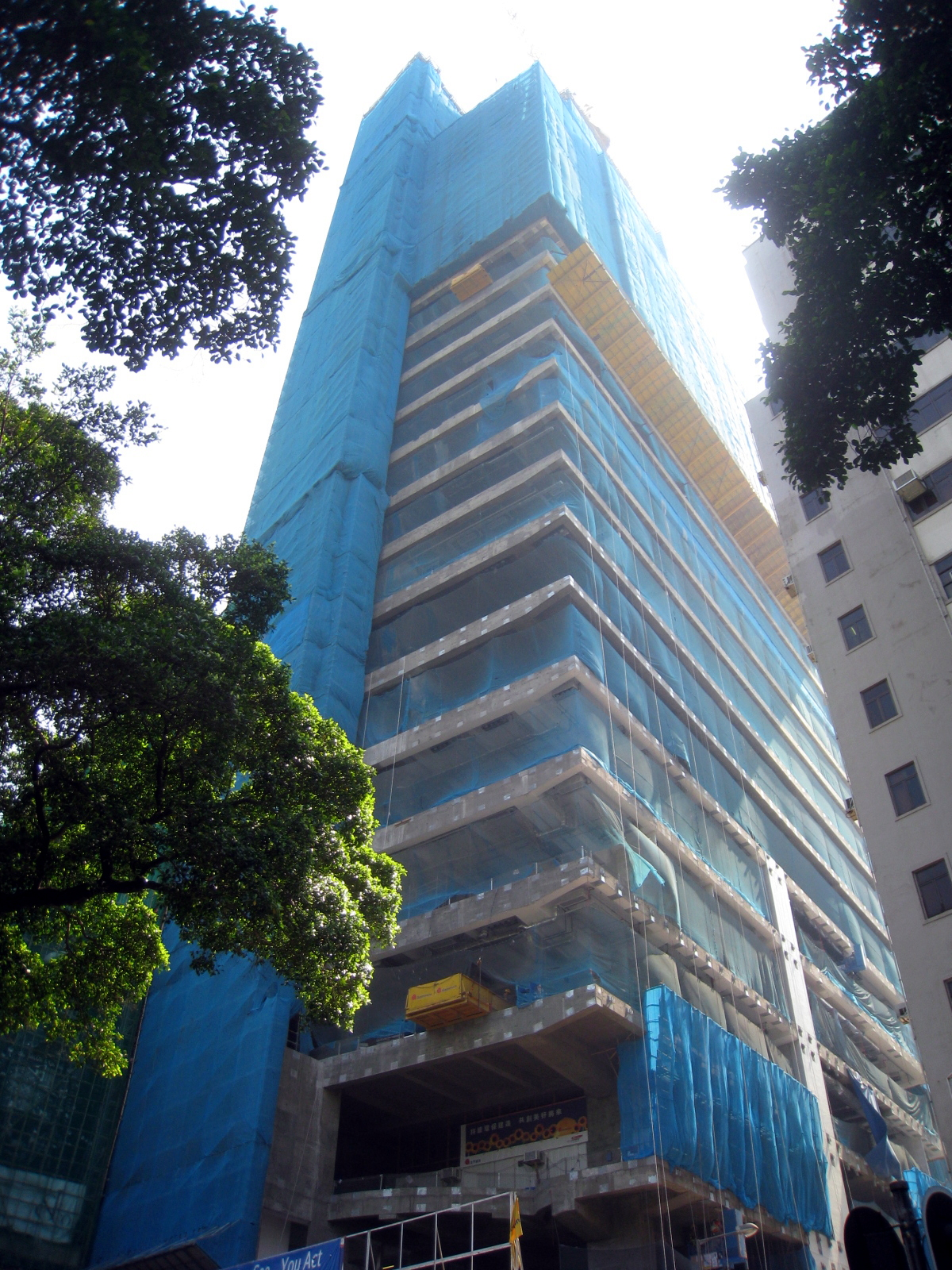
July 2009

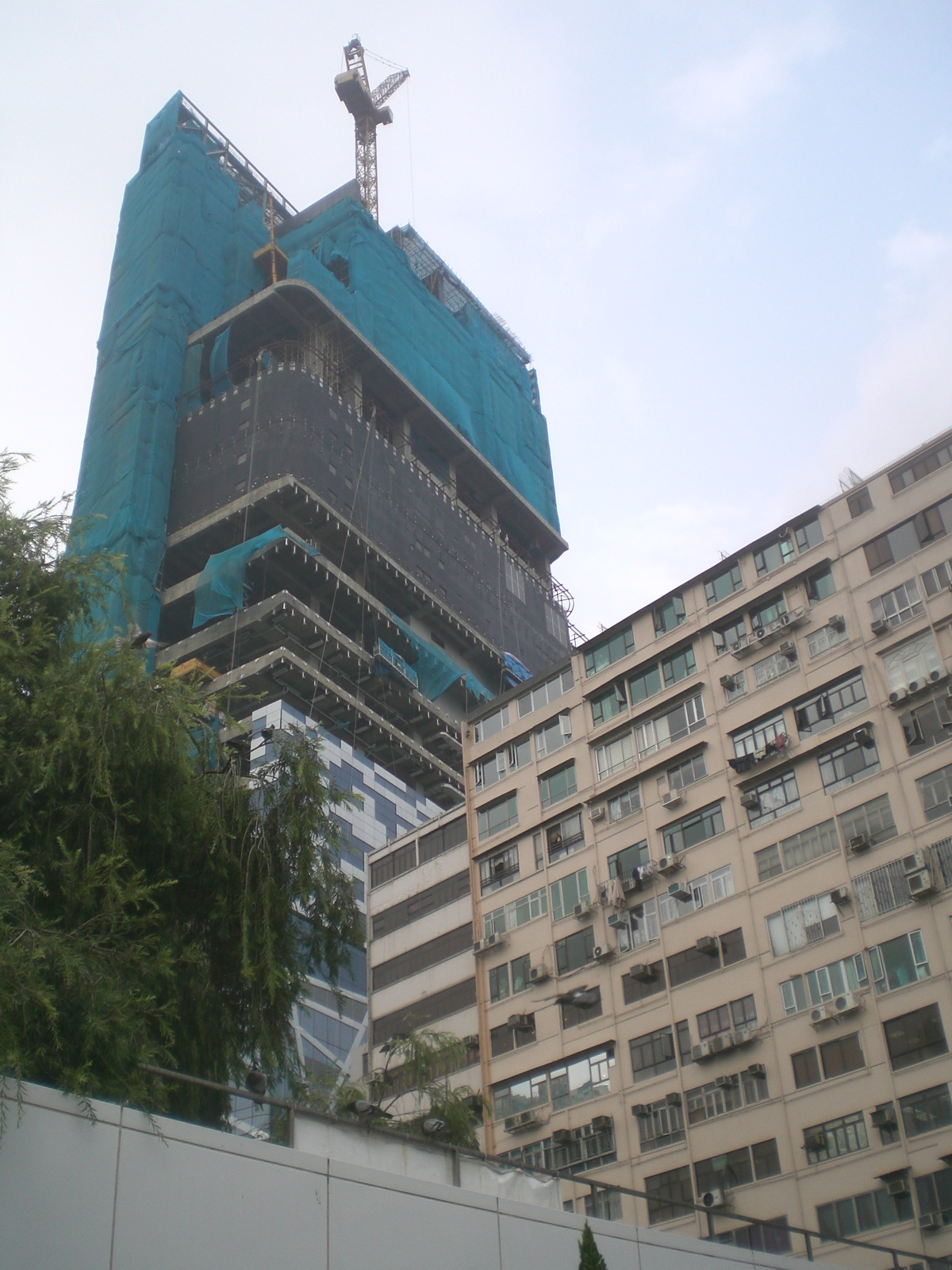
October 2009

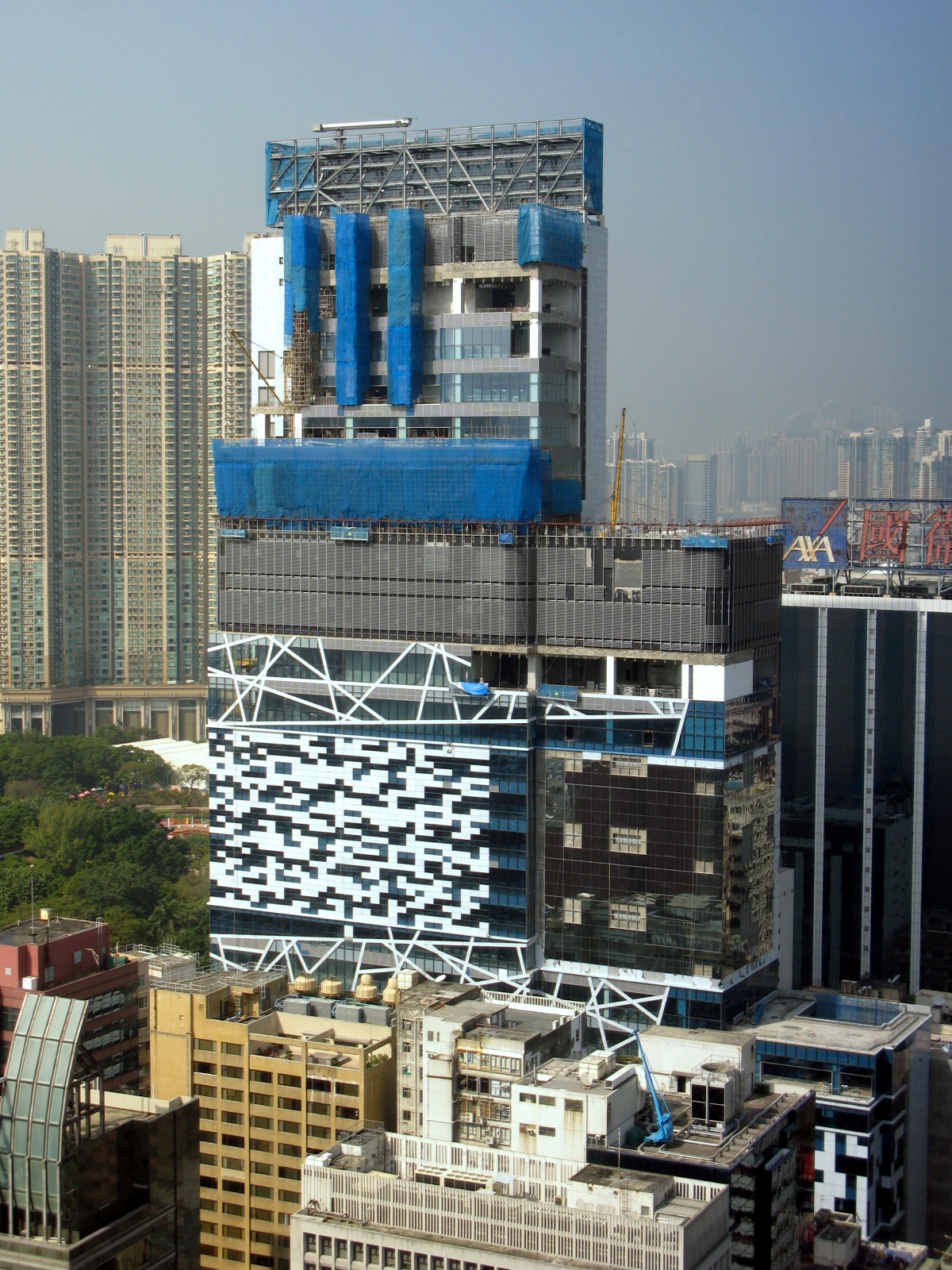
December 2009
