= Hong Kong Time =

Official time zone of Hong Kong

- Time zone

UTC offset
- BT: UTC+08:00

Current time
- 01:47, 8 August 2026 BT [refresh]

Observance of DST
- DST is not observed in this time zone.

Hong Kong Time
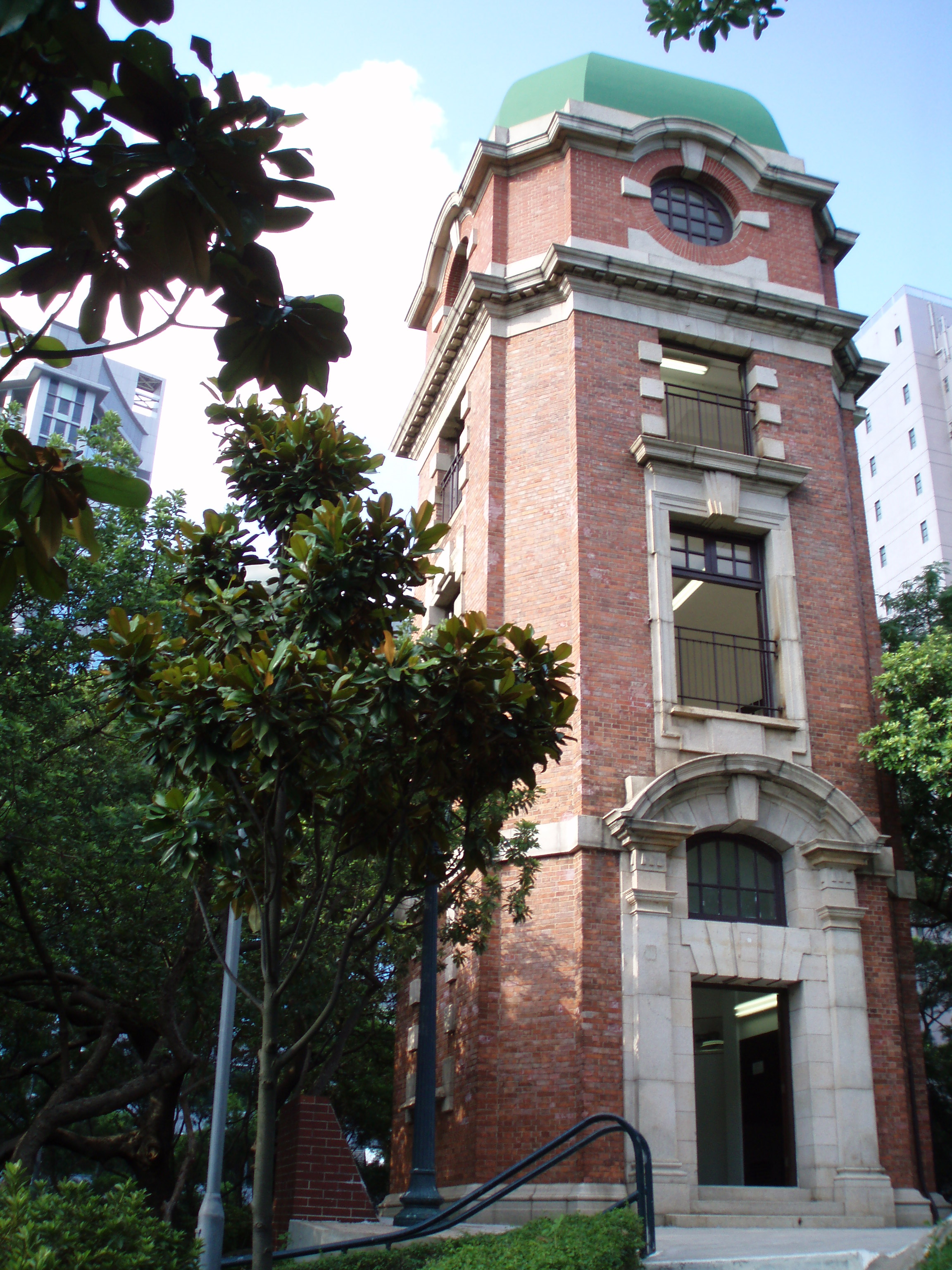
- Blackhead Point Signal Tower, where a time ball was used in the 19th century and early 20th century to announce time.
- Traditional Chinese: 香港時間
- Simplified Chinese: 香港时间
Transcriptions
Standard Mandarin
- Hanyu Pinyin: Xiānggǎng Shíjiān
- Wade–Giles: Hsiang-kang Shih-chien
- IPA: [ɕjáŋkàŋ ʂɻ̩̌tɕjɛ́n]
Yue: Cantonese
- Jyutping: Hoeng1gong2 si4gaan3

Hong Kong Time (abbreviation: HKT; Chinese: 香港時間; Jyutping: hoeng1 gong2 si4 gaan3) is the time in Hong Kong, observed at UTC+08:00 all year round. The Hong Kong Observatory is the official timekeeper of the Hong Kong Time.

Hong Kong adopted daylight saving measures in 1941. However, the practice eventually declined in popularity and was eliminated after 1979.

It is indicated as Asia/Hong_Kong in the IANA time zone database.

== Time standards ==
In Hong Kong, Hong Kong Time is defined in the Interpretation and General Clauses Ordinance (Cap 1), Laws of Hong Kong.

Section 67(2) of the Ordinance states that:

"Hong Kong Time" (香港時間) means the time used for general purposes throughout Hong Kong namely, 8 hours, or such other period as may be determined by the Legislative Council by resolution under this subsection or under section 16 of the Oil (Conservation and Control) Ordinance (Cap 264), in advance of Universal Standard Time.

Currently, Hong Kong time is defined as UTC+08:00. The reference in section 67(2) to the Oil (Conservation and Control) Ordinance is actually a power given to the Legislative Council of Hong Kong to change Hong Kong Time for the purposes of conserving oil, i.e. to implement daylight saving time. However, no daylight saving time has been observed since 1979.

The Hong Kong Time was first set to Local Mean Time (GMT+07:36:42) on 1 January 1885 at 13:00 by the then Royal Observatory Hong Kong. In 1904, the Greenwich Mean Time was adopted as the basis for Hong Kong Time, the time was set at 8 hours in advance of Greenwich Mean Time. The current Coordinated Universal Time system was adopted as an official time standard on 1 January 1972. However, the legal Hong Kong Time still remained based on Greenwich Mean Time until it was changed to Universal Standard Time in 1998 after the Hong Kong handover.

== Timekeeping ==
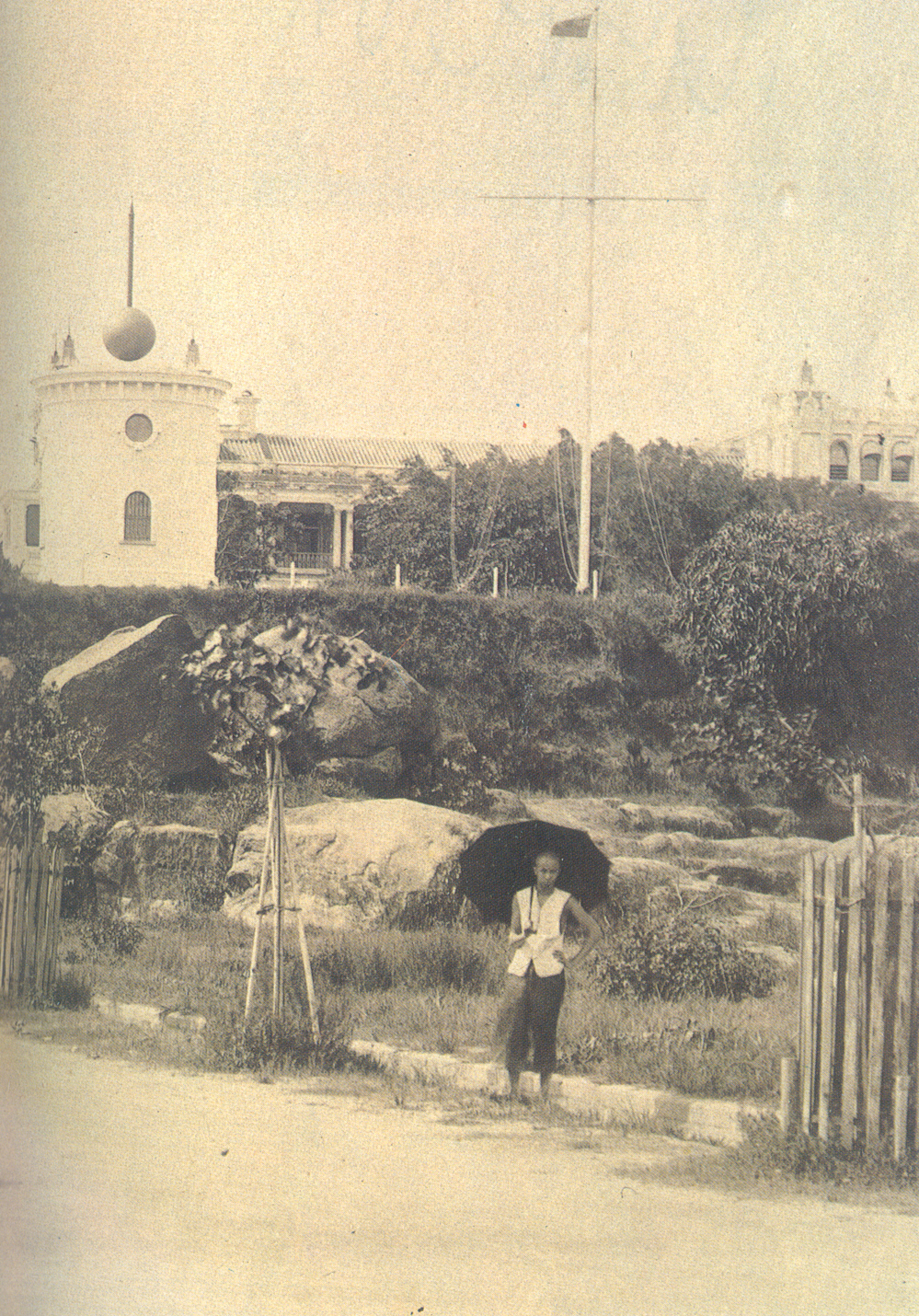
The time ball in front of Marine Police Headquarters Compound, Tsim Sha Tsui, Kowloon c. 1908.

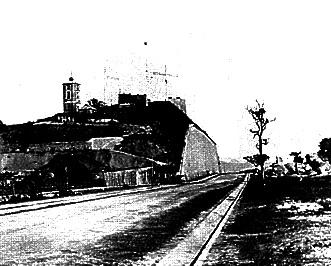
The time ball tower at Blackhead Point in 1908.

From 1885, Hong Kong Time was determined by astronomical observations at the Hong Kong Observatory using a six-inch (150 mm) equatorial mount and a three-inch (76 mm) Transit Circle. The time was announced to the general public, particularly mariners, by dropping a six-foot (1.8 m) diameter time ball from a mast exactly at 13:00 daily in front the Marine Police Headquarters Compound, where it is visible from the Victoria Harbour. In January 1908, the time ball was relocated to the hill of Blackhead Point where it had even higher visibility. With the rise of radio broadcast and the launching of Radio Hong Kong in 1922, the importance of the time ball decreased. It was decommissioned on 30 June 1933.

In 1980, the Royal Observatory adopted a timing system based on a Caesium beam atomic clock. This system narrowed the engineering tolerance down to less than 1 millisecond. The frequency standard of the clock is based on the primary standard used by Japan's Communications Research Laboratory. In 1994, the atomic clock was replaced with a newer model.

== See also ==
- UTC+08:00
- ASEAN Common Time
- tz database
