= HMS Minden =

Nineteen Century Mumbai constructed vessel

Coordinates: 22°17′48″N 114°10′29″E

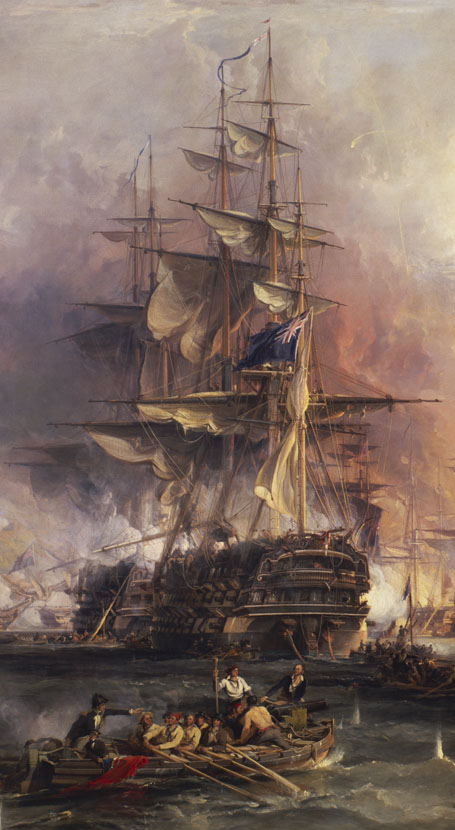
- The Bombardment of Algiers, 27 August 1816, by George Chambers (1836), portrays HMS Minden

History

United Kingdom
- Name: HMS Minden
- Ordered: 9 July 1801
- Builder: Wadia Group
- Launched: 19 June 1810
- Honours and awards: Naval General Service Medal (1847); "30 July Boat Service 1811"; "Algiers"
- Fate: Sold for breaking up, 1861
- Notes: Hulked, 1842

General characteristics
- Class & type: Ganges-class ship of the line
- Tons burthen: 1721 bm
- Length: 169 ft 6 in (51.66 m) (gundeck)
- Beam: 47 ft 8 1/2 in (14.5 m)
- Depth of hold: 20 ft 3 in (6.17 m)
- Propulsion: Sails
- Sail plan: Full-rigged ship
- Armament: 74 guns; Gundeck: 28 × 32 pdrs; Upper gundeck: 28 × 18 pdrs; Quarterdeck: 14 × 9 pdrs; Forecastle: 4 × 9 pdrs

HMS Minden was a 74-gun Ganges-class third-rate ship of the line of Royal Navy. Launched on 19 June 1810 at Bombay, she was named after 1759 Battle of Minden.

== Construction ==
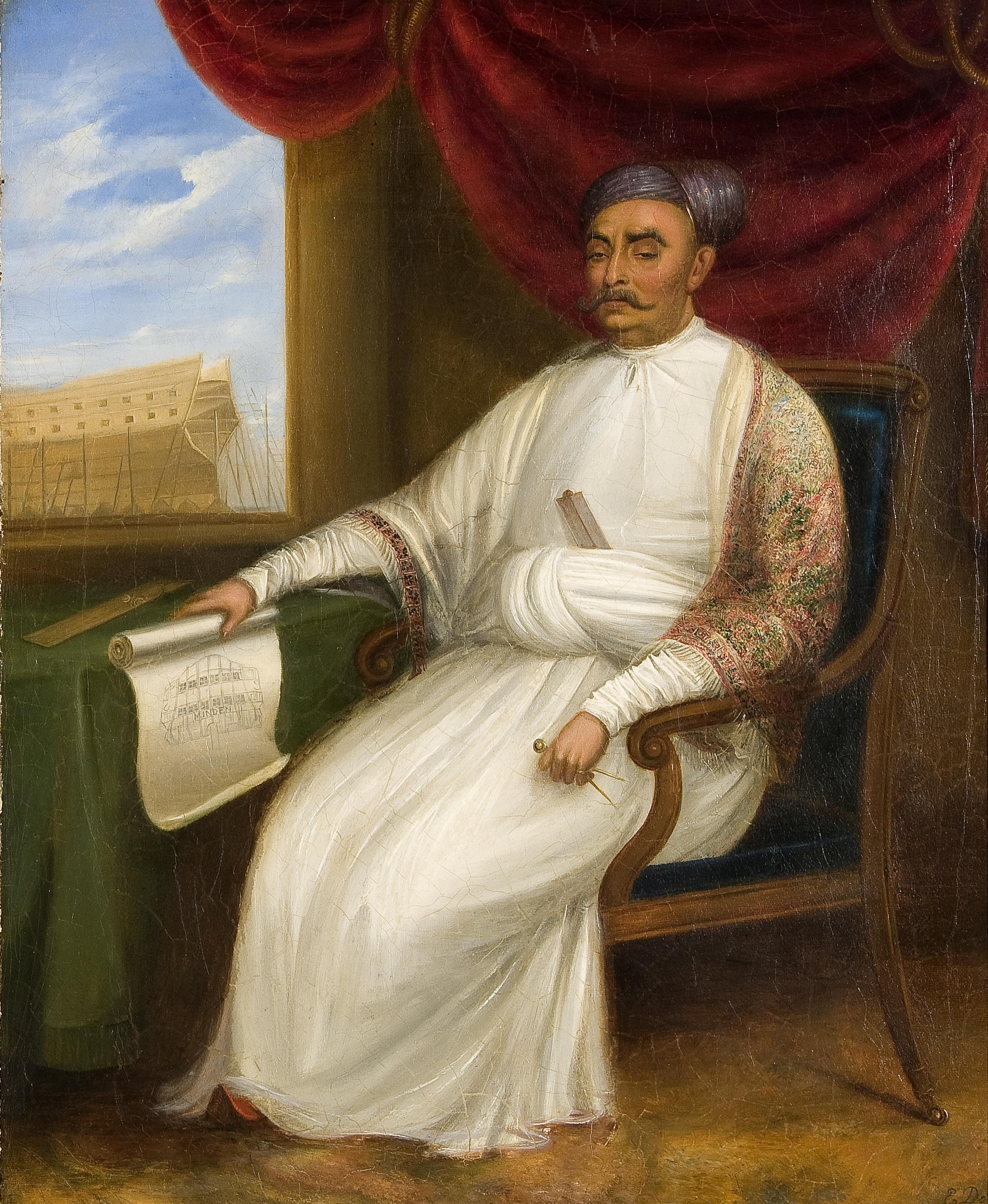
Jamsetjee Bomanjee Wadia, the Parsi master shipbuilder. The Minden can be seen under construction outside the window. Jamsetjee holds a plan of the ship, and wears a shawl as traditionally given to builders by the East India Company on completion of a new ship

Jamsetjee Bomanjee Wadia of the Wadia Group built Minden. She was launched from the Duncan Docks in Bombay, Bombay Presidency India, and was built of teak.

The Bombay Courier, 23 June 1810 wrote:

"On Tuesday last His Majesty’s Ship, the Minden built in the new docks (Bombay) by Jamsetji Bomanji Wadia was floated into the stream at high water, after the usual ceremony of breaking the bottle had been performed by the Honorable Governor Jonathan Duncan. Also In having produced the Minden, Bombay is entitled to the distinguished praise of providing the first and only British ship of the line built out of the limits of the Mother Country; and in the opinion of very competent judges, the Minden, for beauty of construction and strength of frame, may stand in competition with any man-o-war that has come out of the most celebrated Dockyards of Great Britain. For the skill of its architects, for the superiority of its timber, and for the excellence of its docks, Bombay may now claim a distinguished place among naval arsenals".

== Service history ==
Minden sailed from Bombay on 8 February 1811 on her first cruise, under the command of Edward Wallis Hoare, and manned by the crew of the Russell. In March she sailed from Madras to take part in the invasion of Java. On 29 July two of her boats, under the command of Lieutenant Edmund Lyons, with only 35 officers and men aboard, attacked and captured the fort covering the harbour of Marrack, to the westward of Batavia. The Naval General Service Medal with the clasp "30 July Boat Service 1811" was issued to survivors of this action in 1848. The Dutch and French forces in Java surrendered in September. Minden then sailed for the UK and escorted convoys to the East Indies, the Cape of Good Hope, South America, and the coast of Africa.

Minden sailed from Portsmouth under Captain Alexander Skene on 6 August 1812 arriving at Madras, India on 29 January 1813 where she then served as the flagship of Vice Admiral Sir Samuel Hood, Commander-in-Chief of the East Indies Station. While there, she was first commanded by Captain William Webley, then by Captain Joseph Prior, and thereafter (20 April 1814) by Captain George Henderson (until 14 January 1815). "In the summer of 1814 [Admiral Hood] made a voyage, in his majesty’s ship Minden, to the eastern parts of his station.” He eventually arrived at Semarang, Java on 29 June 1814. Hood then "sailed on the Minden from Batavia on 1 August 1814 for Madras, where he [later] died on 24 December of that year.”. The Minden remained in the East Indies until September 1815 when she returned to England, arriving at Portsmouth on 4 February 1816.

In late July 1816 Minden sailed from Plymouth Sound, as part of an Anglo-Dutch fleet that made an attack on Algiers on 27 August. The Naval General Service Medal with the clasp "Algiers" was issued to survivors of this battle in 1848.

Minden then sailed for the East Indies, and was reported to be at Trincomalee in 1819. In July 1830 Minden was at Plymouth. She was commissioned there on 19 March 1836 and sailed for the Tagus joining the British squadron. In 1839 she was at Malta, returning to Plymouth in early 1840.

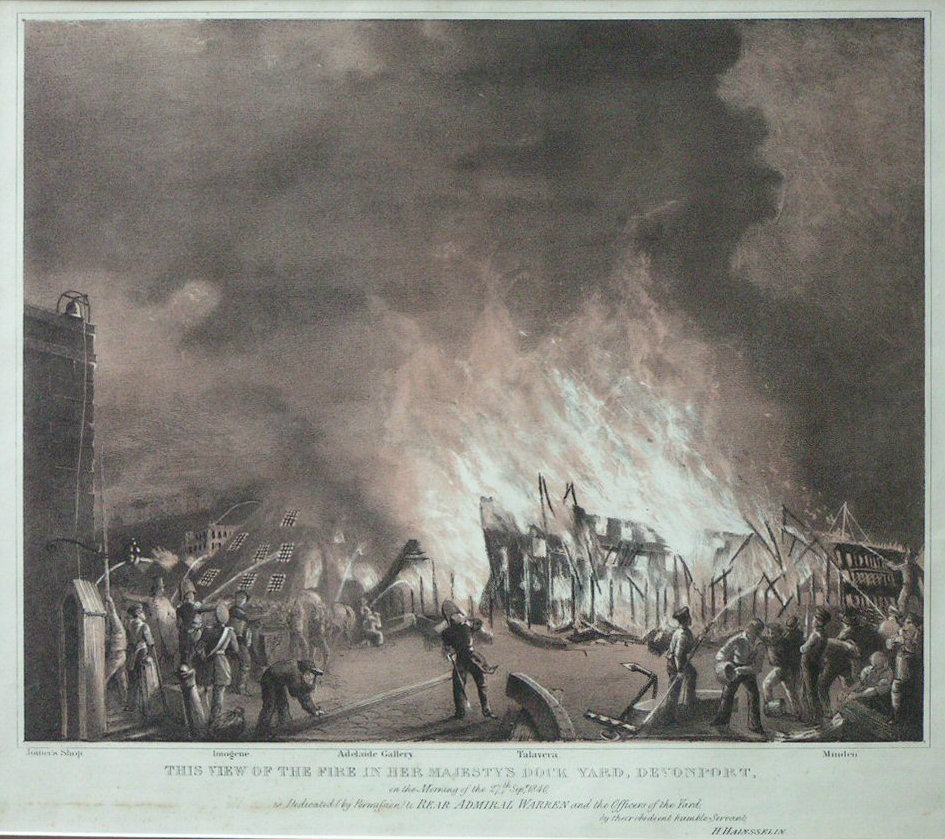
The fire on the morning of 27 September 1840, which threatened to destroy Devonport dockyard and the Minden

She was at Devonport dockyard when it suffered severe damage in a large scale fire on 25 September 1840, it started in the North Dock on HMS Talavera which was completely gutted, spread to the Minden whose fire was successfully put out, and spread to nearby buildings and equipment.

A typhoon destroyed the shore-based Royal Naval Hospital at Hong Kong on 22 July 1841, and Minden was commissioned at Plymouth in December 1841 to serve as a hospital ship there. She was stationed at Hong Kong as a hospital ship from 1842 until she was replaced by HMS Alligator in 1846. Minden then served there as stores ship until sold for scrapping in August 1861.

In memory of the ship, two streets were named after her, Minden Row and Minden Avenue, located behind Signal Hill of Tsim Sha Tsui in Kowloon, Hong Kong.
