= Minden Row =

Street in Hong Kong

Coordinates: 22.296453°N 114.173699°E

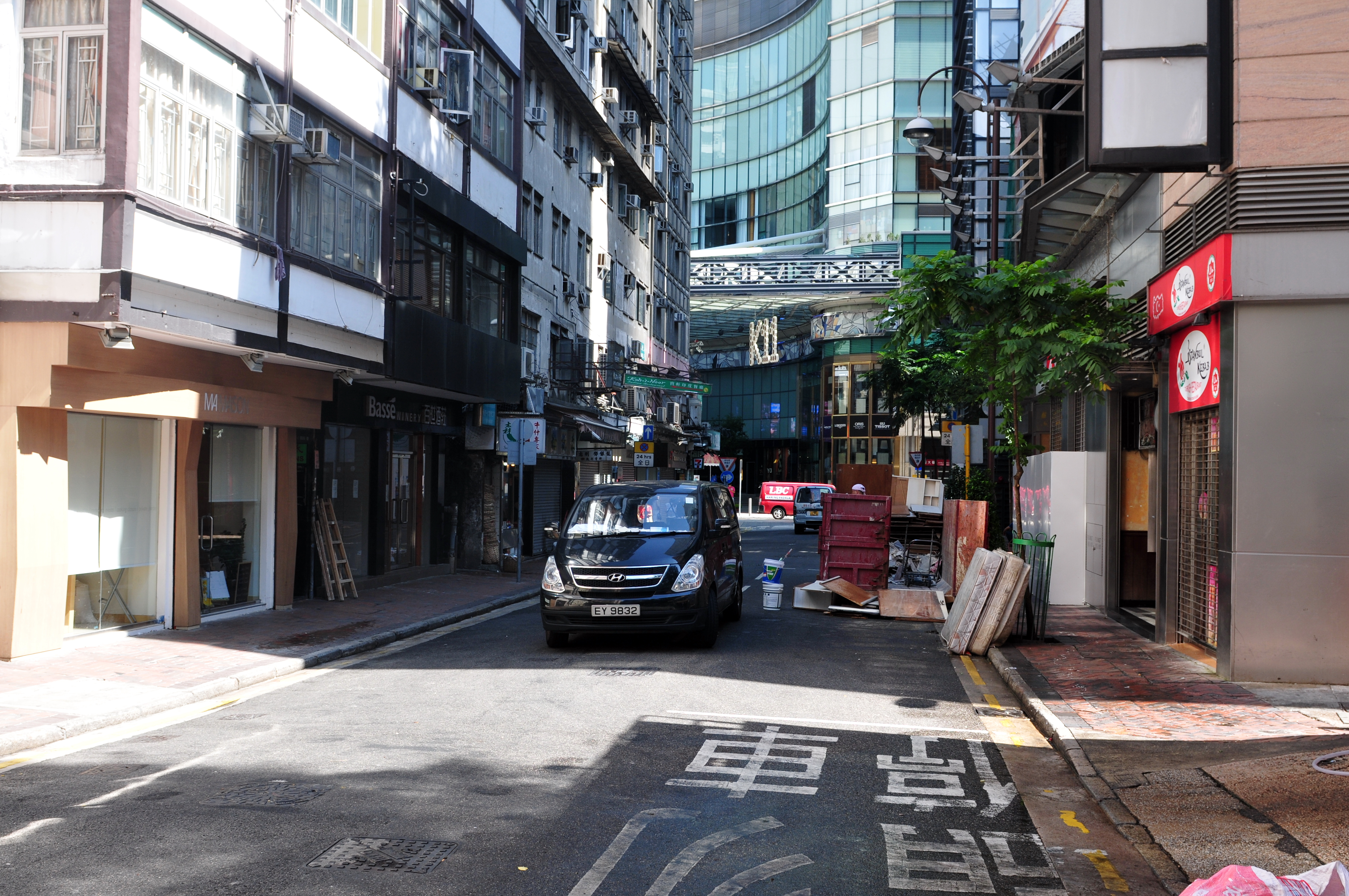
View of Minden Row toward the K11 shopping mall

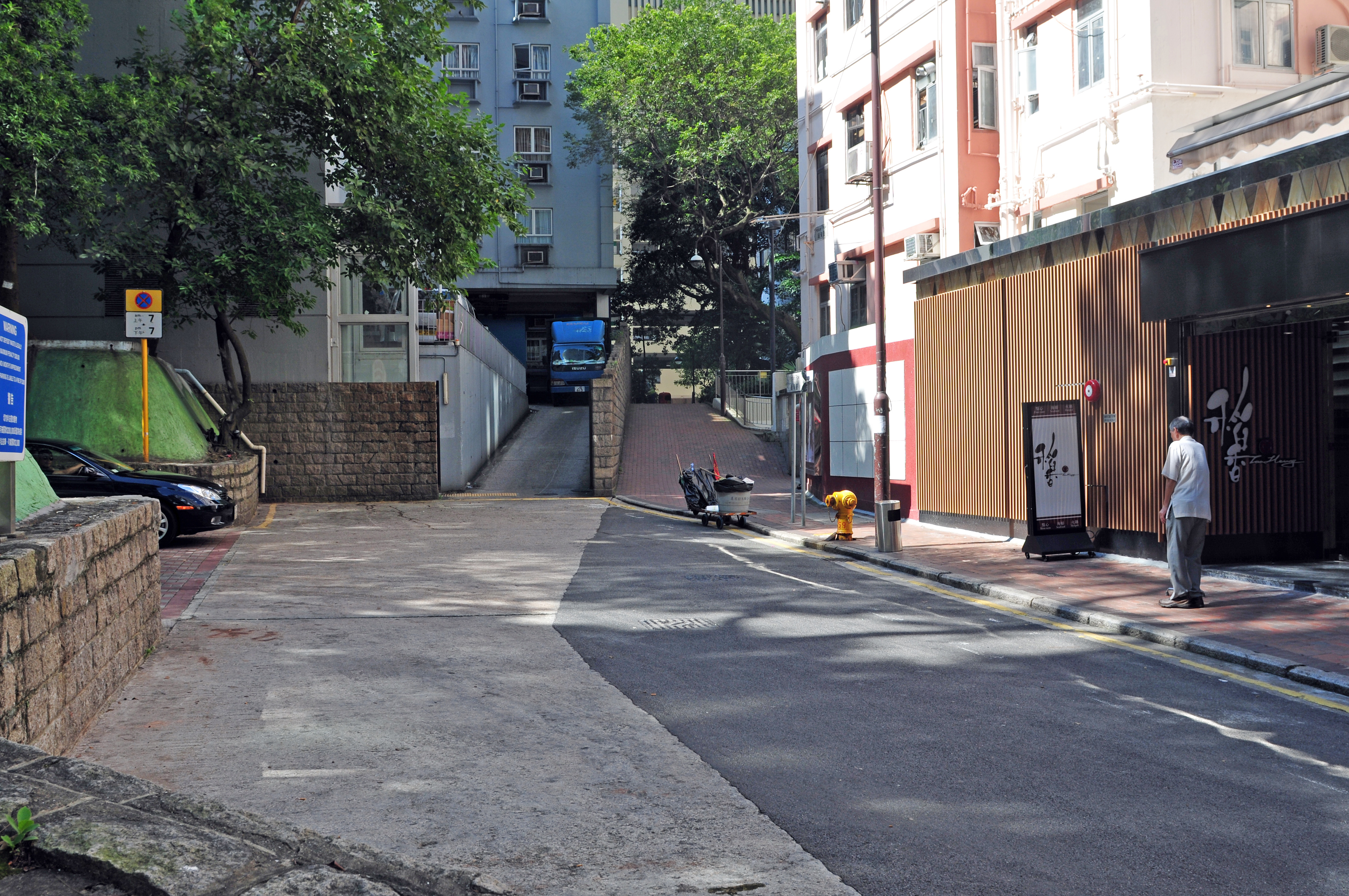
View of Minden Row toward the Mariner's Club.

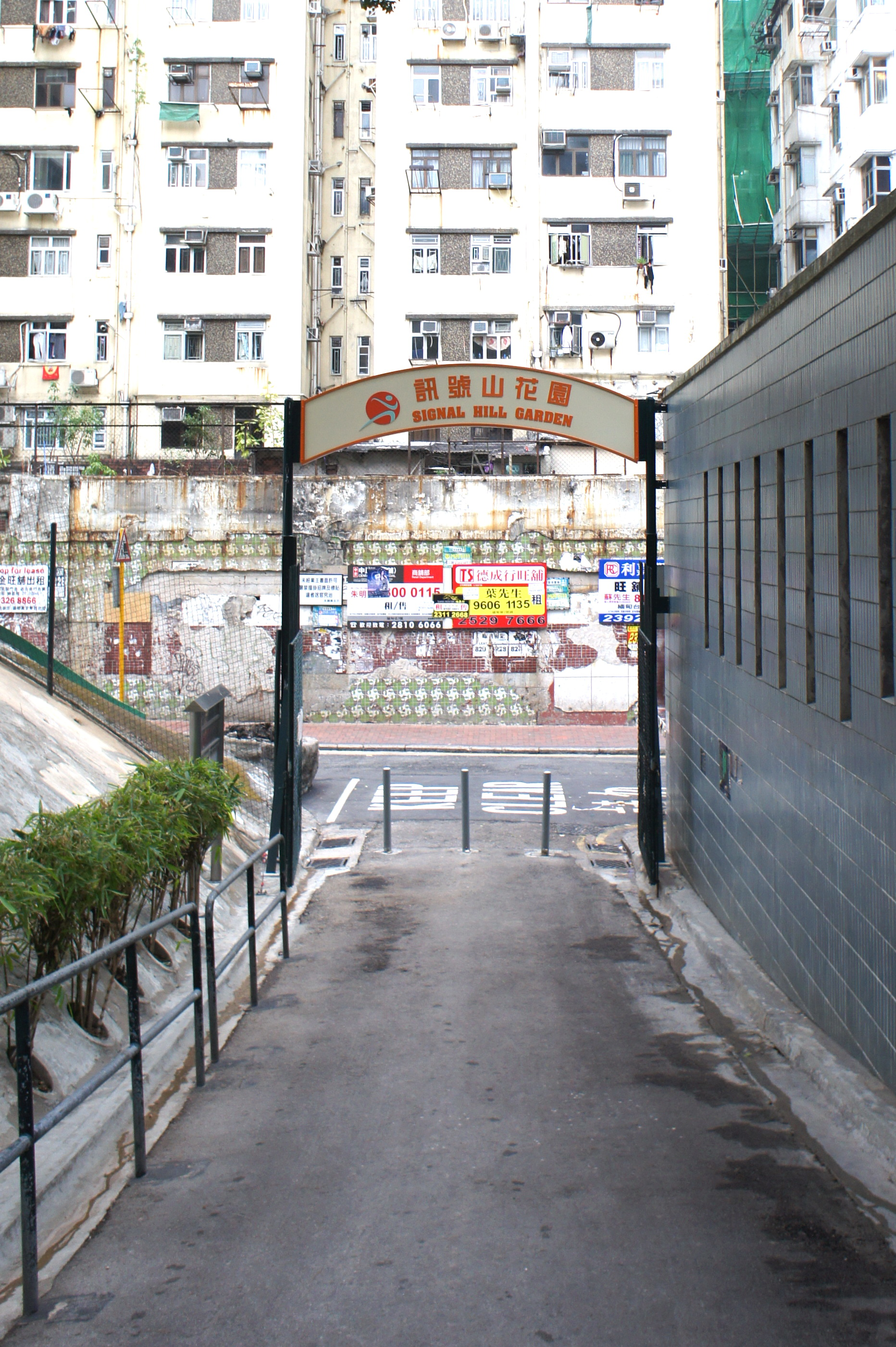
Signal Hill Garden entrance along Minden Row.

Minden Row (Chinese: 緬甸臺) is a street in Tsim Sha Tsui, Kowloon, Hong Kong. It junctions Mody Road to the north and ends at Middle Road to the south. A short alley called Minden Avenue (棉登徑) junctions the middle of the street.

== Name ==
The street is named after HMS Minden, a Royal Navy ship of the line, which was in turn named after the German town Minden and the Battle of Minden of 1759, a decisive victory of British and Prussian forces over France in the Seven Years' War. She served as a hospital ship in Hong Kong after a typhoon destroyed the shore-based Royal Naval Hospital at Hong Kong on 22 July 1841.

Nonetheless, the Chinese name (Chinese: 緬甸臺; lit. 'Myanmar Row') of the street was a mistranslation, as it has little to do with the Southeast Asian country.

== Features ==
The small section near Middle Road was designated pedestrian only and the entrance of Signal Hill Garden is at its left. The southern portion linking Middle and Salisbury Roads cuts under the Middle Road car park. All tourist attractions and shopping malls in Tsim Sha Tsui are within walking distance and a number of bars and restaurants lies along the street.

== See also ==
- List of streets and roads in Hong Kong
- Mariner's Club
