= Mariner's Club =

Building in Hong Kong

Coordinates: 22.295818°N 114.173811°E

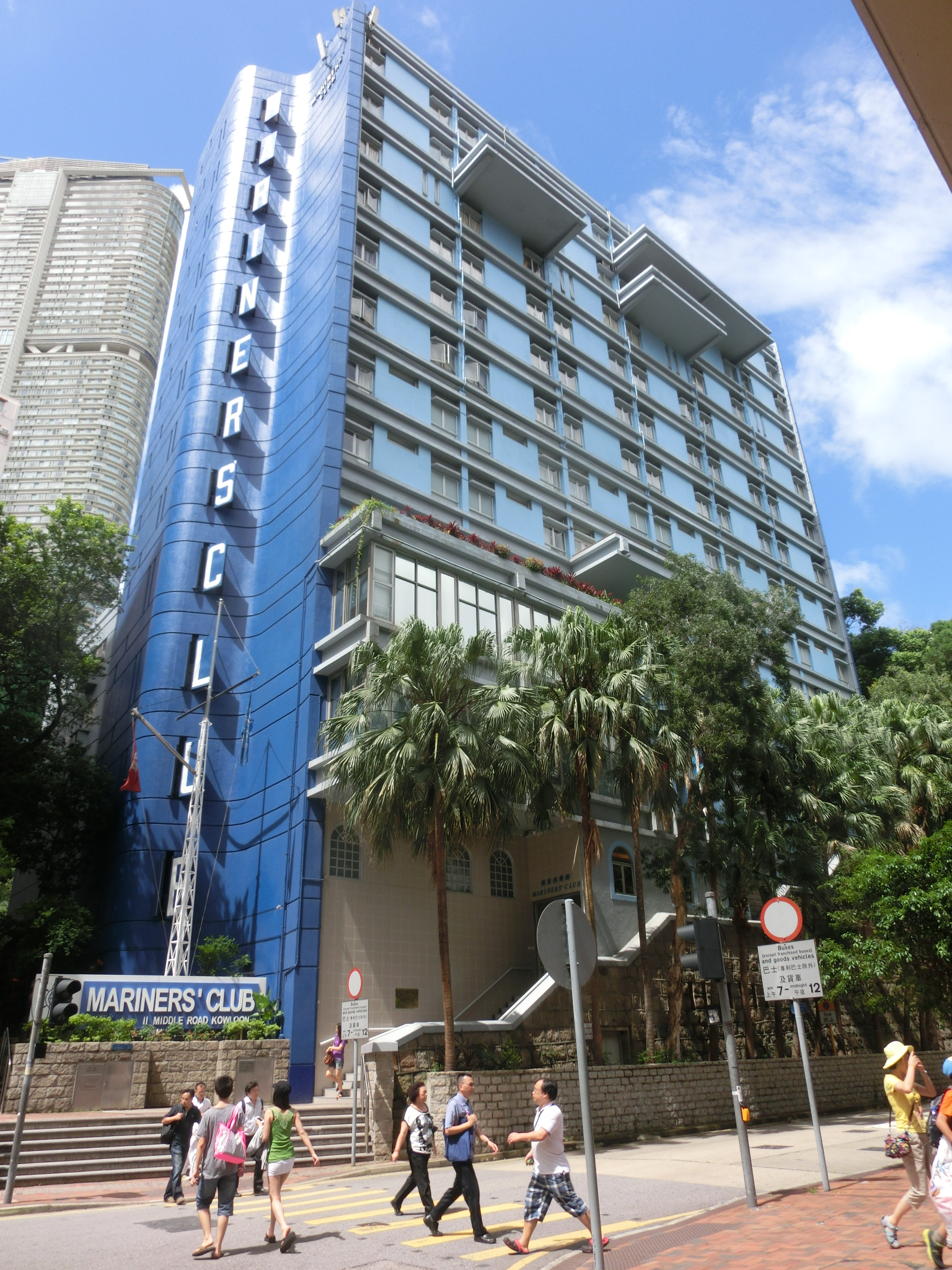
The Mariner's Club in 2013.

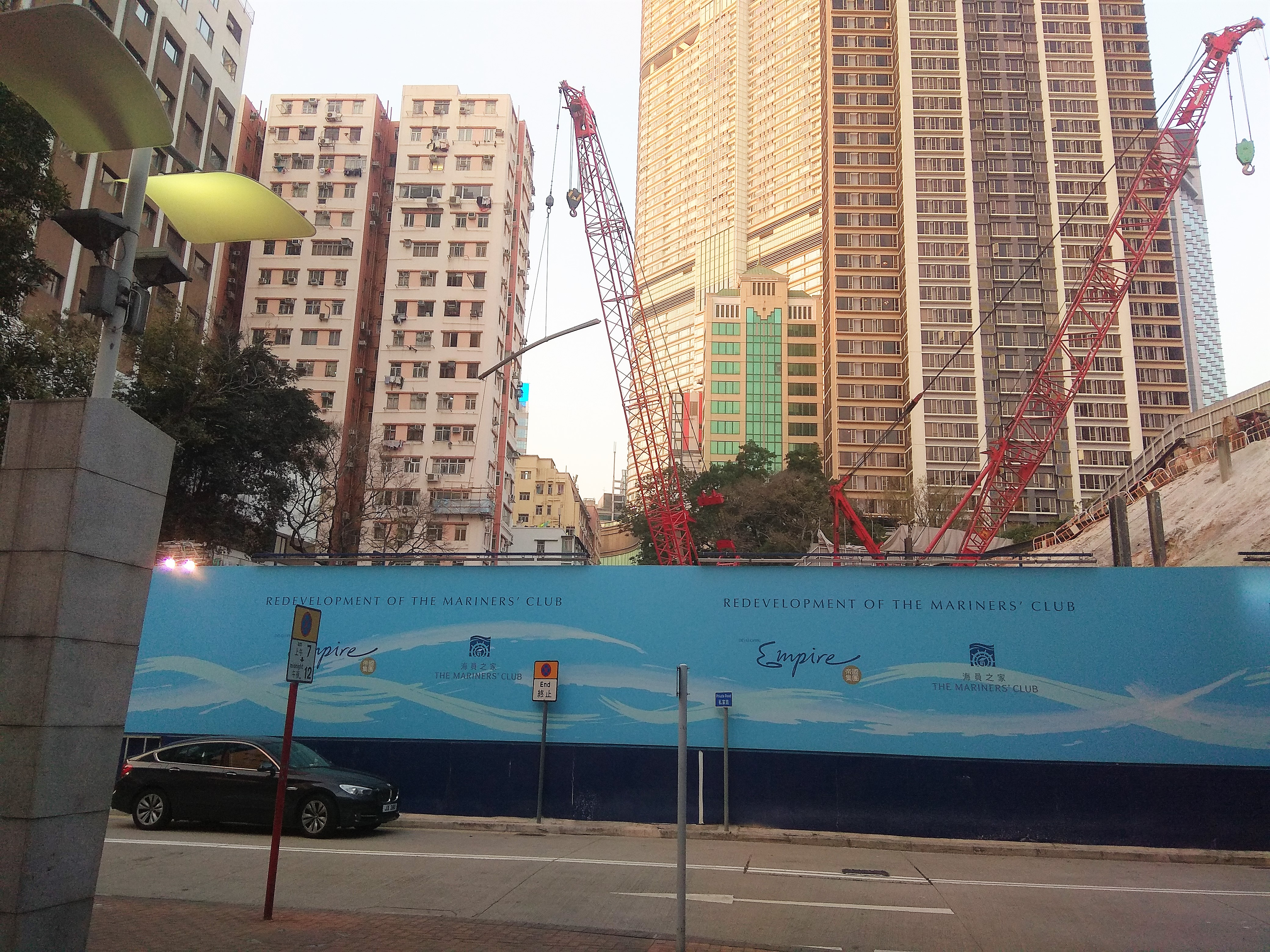
The site under redevelopment in 2021.

The Mariners (Chinese: 海員之家) was a building in 11 Middle Road, Tsim Sha Tsui, Kowloon, Hong Kong.

The Sailors Home & Mission to Seafarers operates two diffrent facilities, including The Mariners in Tsim Sha Tsui and The Mariners Seafarers Centre in Kwai Chung.

Supported by the Hong Kong Government as part of their commitment to the Maritime Labour Convention 2006, The Mariners Tsim Sha Tsui has been redeveloped and opened in 2025 serving as the hub for seafarers, their families, and the maritime community.

== History ==
The Mariners at Tsim Sha Tsui was officially opened on 30 May 1967 by the then Governor Sir David Trench.

In 2018, the original Tsim Sha Tsui building was closed for a redevelopment project backed by the Empire Group to convert the site into a multi-use complex comprising a commercial hotel and a modernized home for seafarers.

== See also ==
- Blackhead Point
- Minden Row
