= HMS Minotaur (1816) =

Ship of the line of the Royal Navy

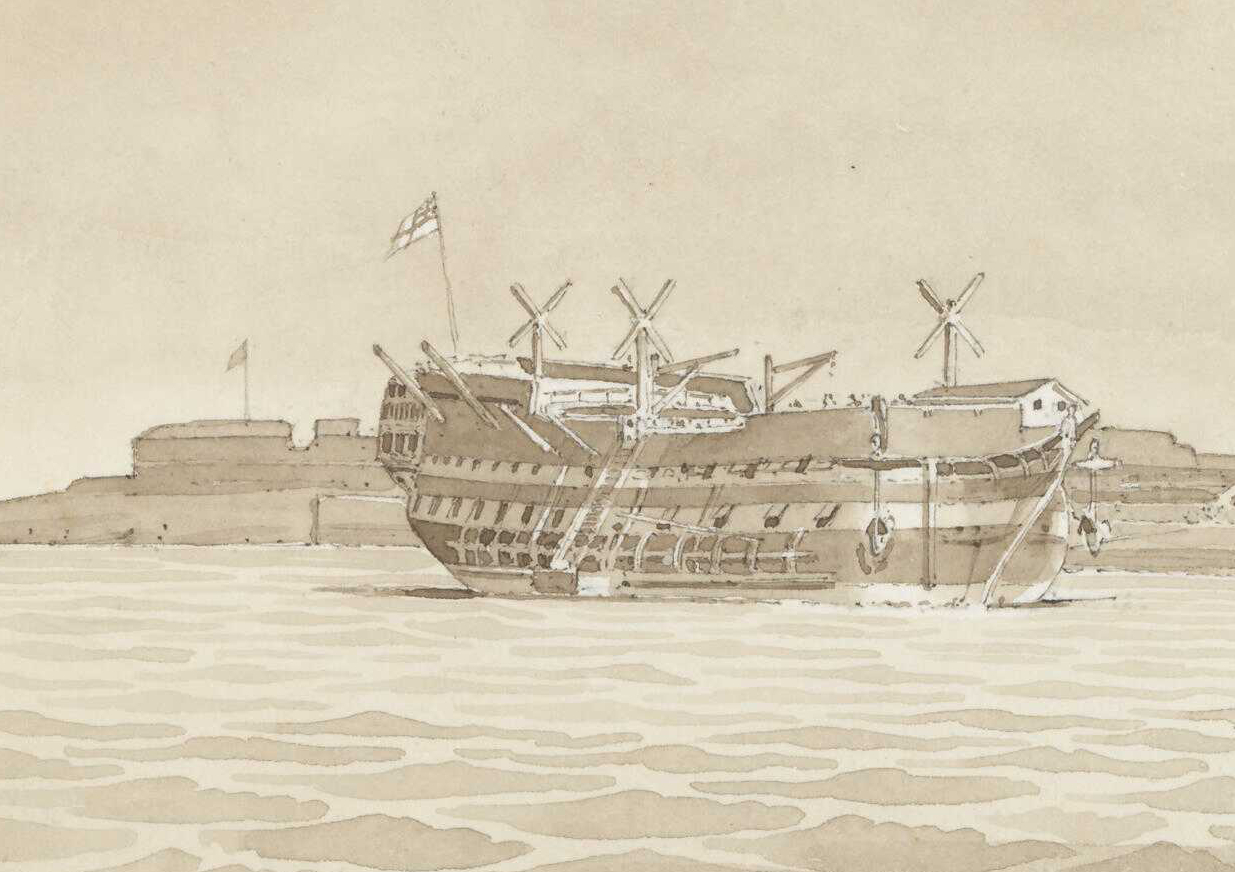
- Minotaur in 1851

History

United Kingdom
- Name: HMS Minotaur
- Ordered: 3 December 1811
- Builder: Robert Seppings (1812-1813), George Parkin (1813-1816), Chatham Dockyard
- Laid down: December 1812
- Launched: 15 April 1816
- Fate: Broken up, 1869

General characteristics
- Class & type: Ganges-class ship of the line
- Tons burthen: 1726 3/94 bm
- Length: 139 ft 7.5 in (42.558 m) (gundeck)
- Beam: 48 ft 2.5 in (14.694 m)
- Depth of hold: 20 ft 3.75 in (6.1913 m)
- Propulsion: Sails
- Sail plan: Full-rigged ship
- Complement: 550
- Armament: 74 guns: Gundeck: 28 × 32 pdrs; Upper gundeck: 28 × 18 pdrs; Quarterdeck: 14 × 9 pdrs; Forecastle: 4 × 9 pdrs

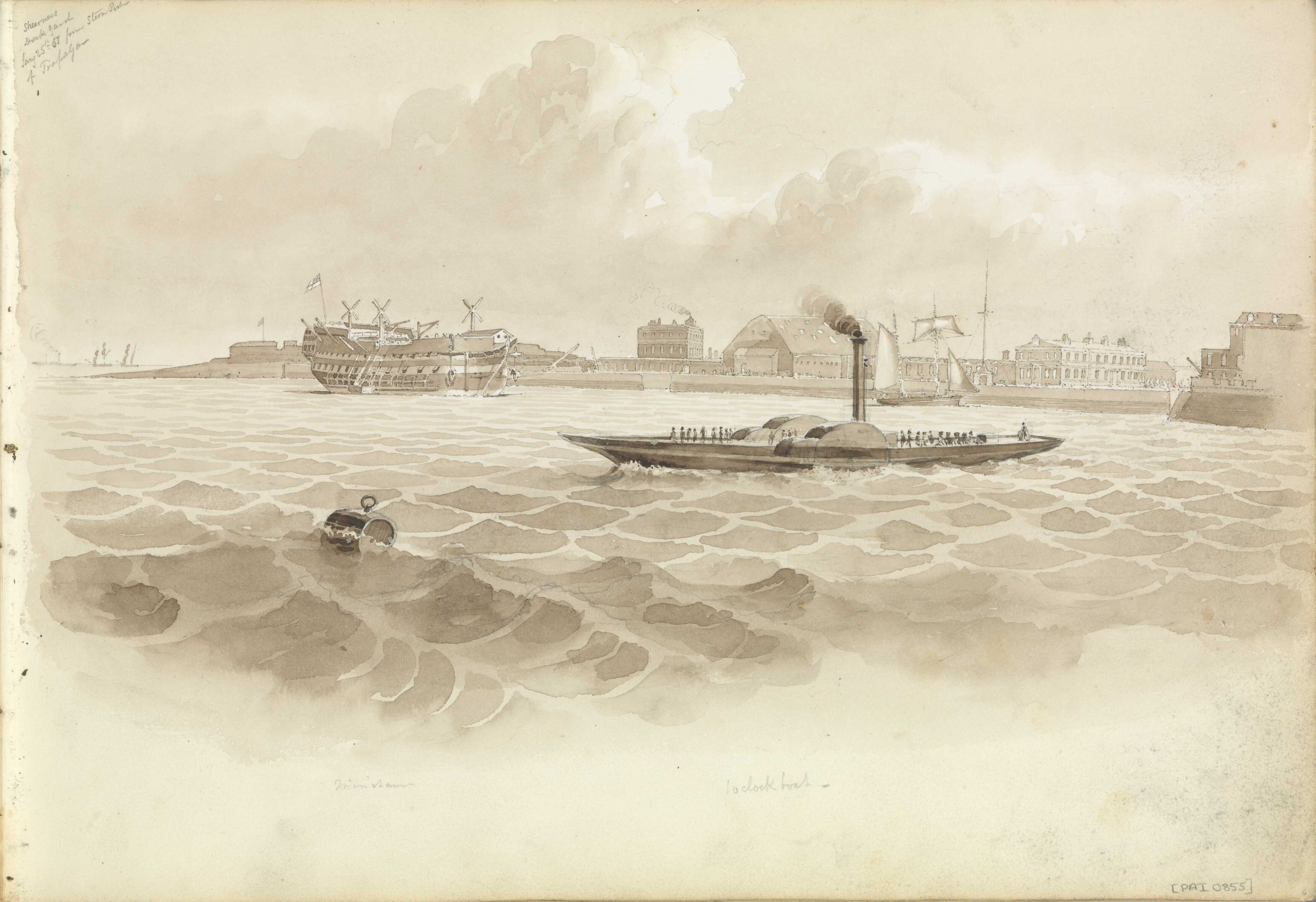
The receiving ship Minotaur on moorings in front of Blockhouse Point, Sheerness and the '1 o'clock boat' (steamer) in the foreground, 25 January 1851

HMS Minotaur was a 74-gun third rate ship of the line of the Royal Navy, launched on 15 April 1816 at Chatham Dockyard.

She was never commissioned for sea service; on completion of construction the new vessel was immediately placed in reserve at Sheerness Dockyard until 1842 when she was fitted as a receiving ship for naval conscripts. By 1859 she had become a guardship in Sheerness harbour, and in 1861 was converted into a floating lazarette for passengers from merchant vessels who were suspected by the Customs Service of bringing in disease. Five years later she was sailed to Gravesend to serve as a hospital for cholera patients.

In July 1866 she was renamed Hermes, but was broken up at Sheerness Dockyard in 1869.
