= Middle Road, Hong Kong =

Street in Tsim Sha Tsui, Hong Kong

Coordinates: 22.29561°N 114.17205°E

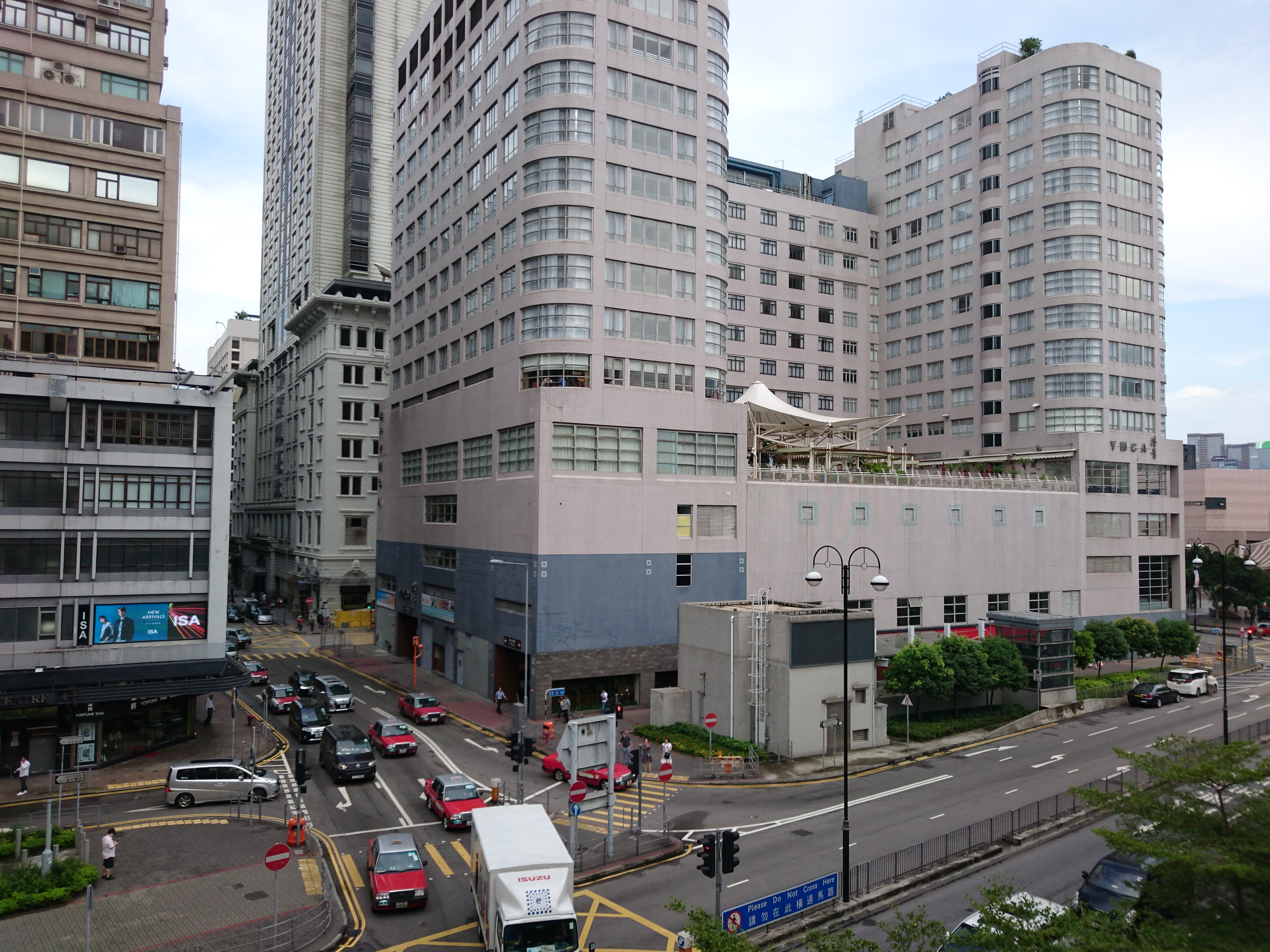
Western end of Middle Road, at its junction with Kowloon Park Drive in August 2016. The building in the centre is The Salisbury YMCA of Hong Kong. Photograph taken from the hill where the Former Marine Police Headquarters Compound stands.

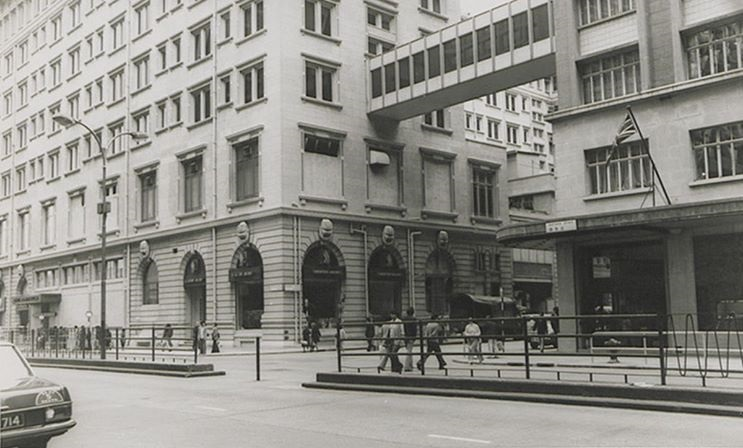
Junction of Nathan Road and Middle Road in the 1970s. The Peninsula Court (1957-1982) was built across Middle Road to act as an annex building of the Peninsula Hotel. A skyway was built in the 1970s to connect the two buildings.

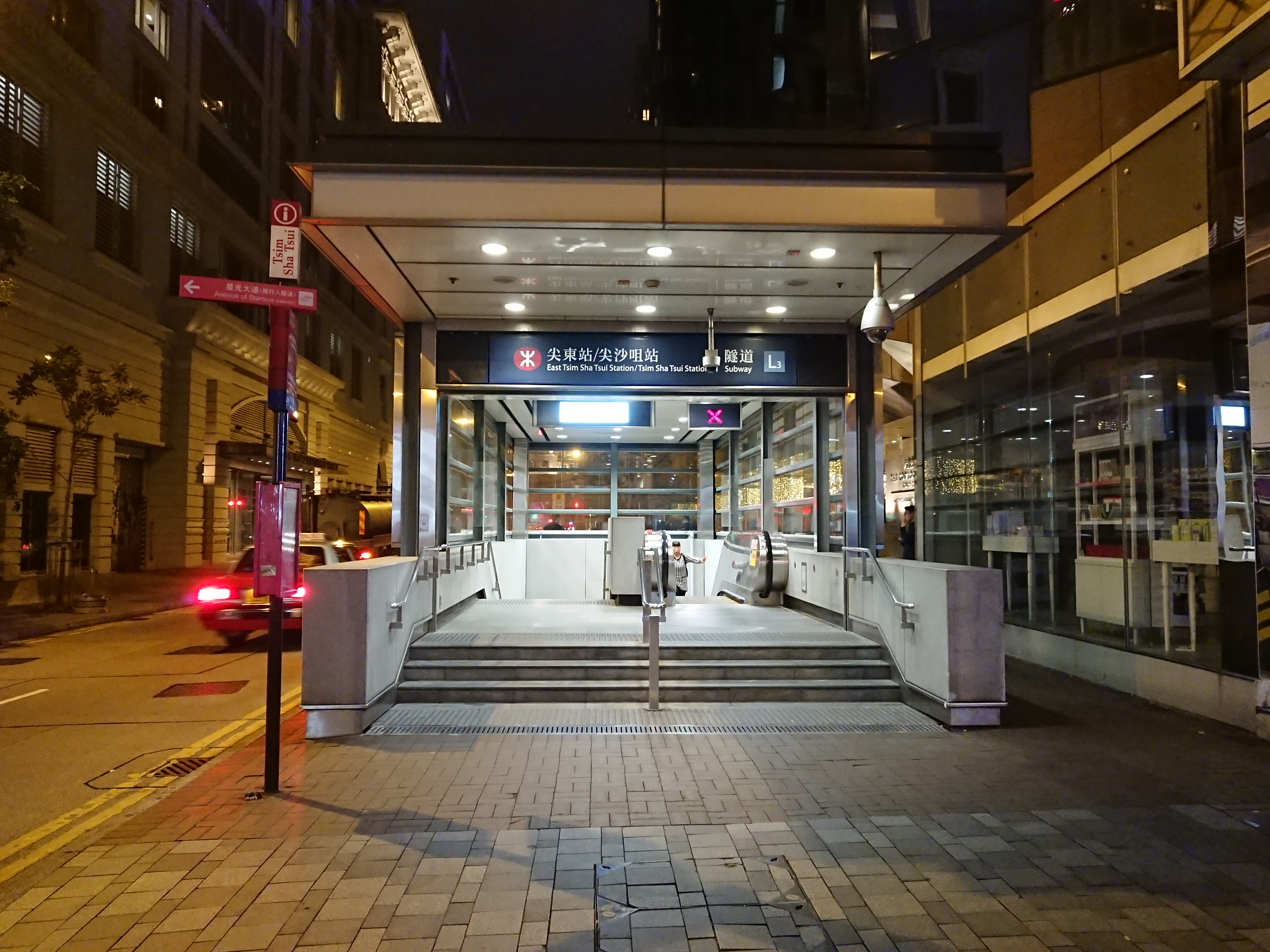
Exit L3 of East Tsim Sha Tsui station in the west section of Middle Road, at the corner of Nathan Road in March 2019. The back of the Peninsula Hotel is visible on the left; the Kowloon Hotel is on the right.

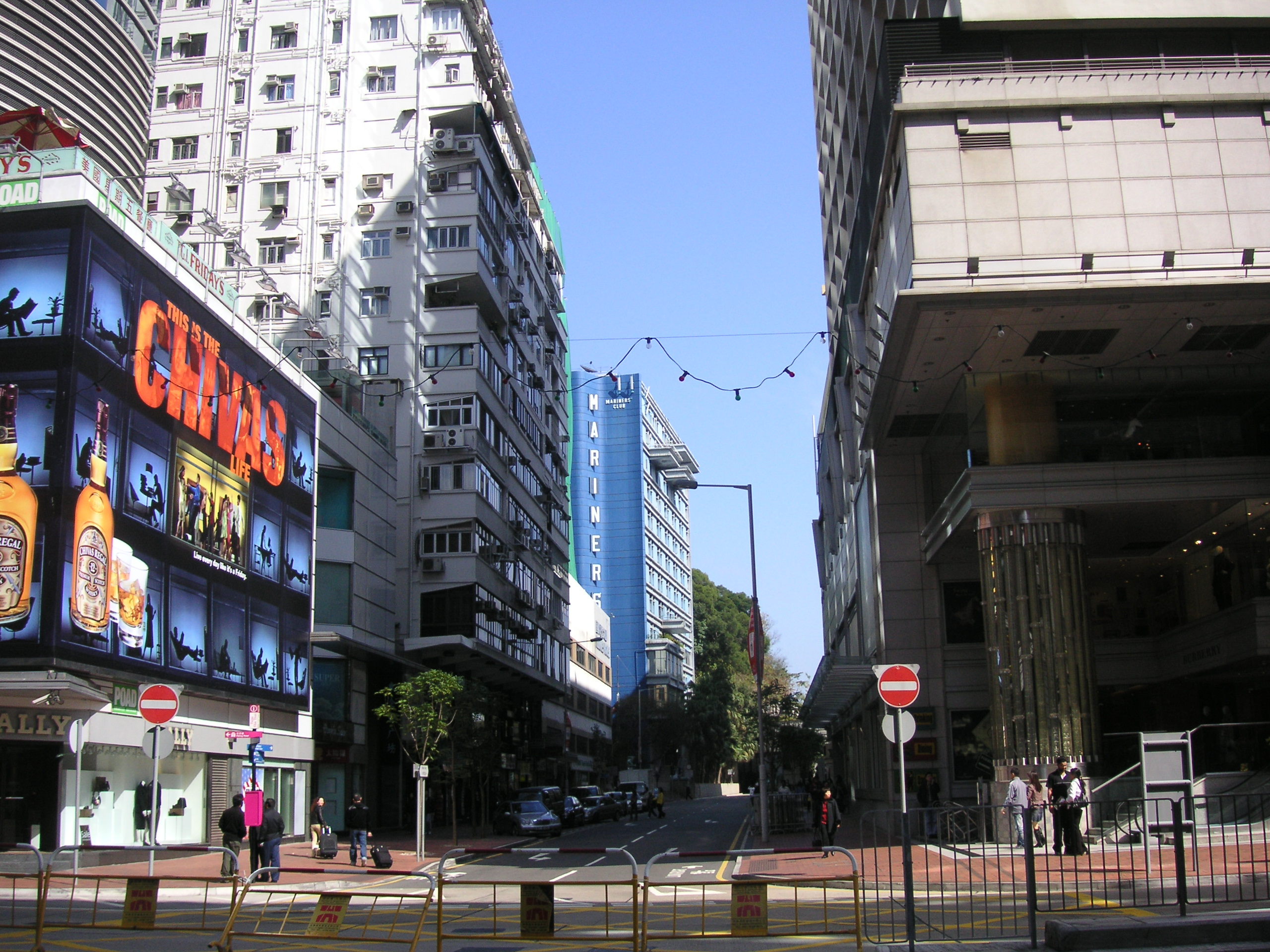
East section of Middle Road with Nathan Road in the front in February 2006. 26 Nathan Road is visible on the left, while the Sheraton Hotel is visible on the right.

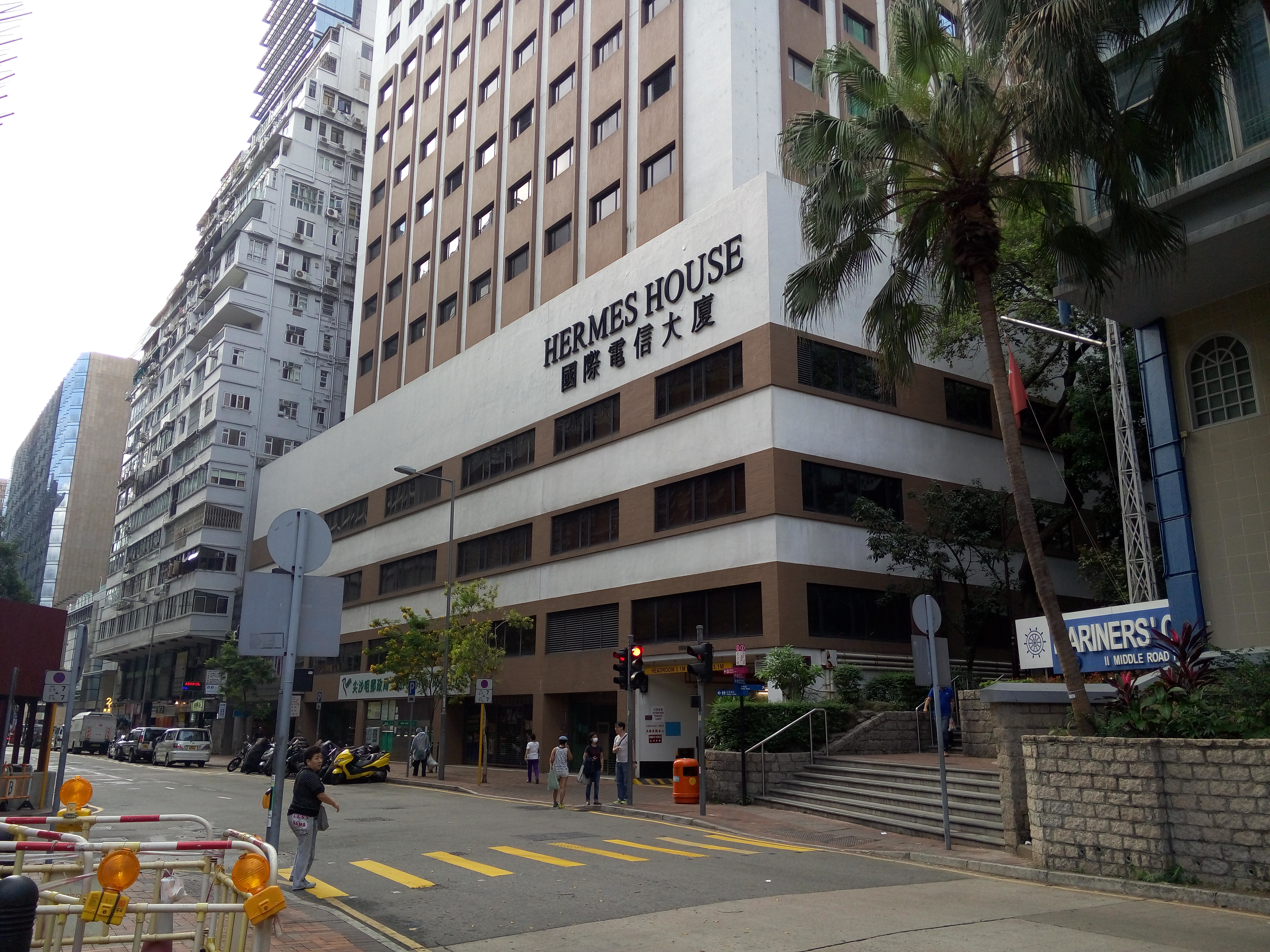
Hermes House in the east section of Middle Road in April 2015. The stairs on the right lead to Minden Row.

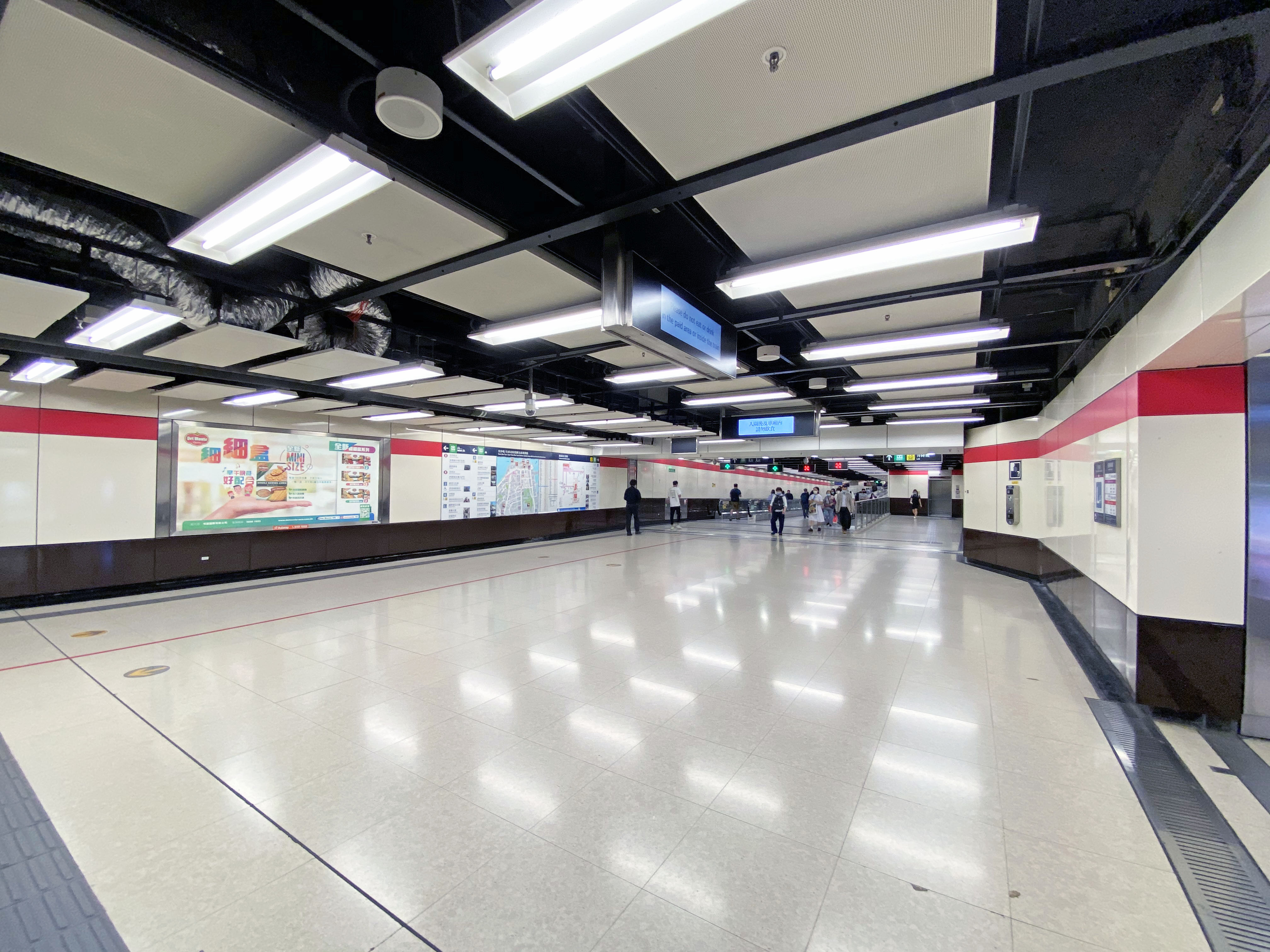
Subway underneath Middle Road in October 2020. The exit on the right leads to Kowloon Hotel.

Middle Road (traditional Chinese: 中間道; simplified Chinese: 中间道; Cantonese Yale: jung1 gaan1 dou6; pinyin: Zhōngjiān Dào) is a street in the southern part of Tsim Sha Tsui, Kowloon, Hong Kong.

The street runs from Kowloon Park Drive in the west to the entrance of East Tsim Sha Tsui station in the east, where it makes a 90-degree turn to the south, terminating at Salisbury Road. Part of Middle Road marks the original coastline of Tsim Sha Tsui prior to land reclamation. A subway runs underneath the east–west segment of the street, forming an important pedestrian artery in the district.

== History ==
Constructed in the late 19th century, Middle Road formerly ran along the coastline between Blackhead Point and the hill where the Former Marine Police Headquarters Compound stands. Middle Road roughly aligns with the original concave coastline between these two promontories, where once there was a beach. The bay was reclaimed for the construction of the former Kowloon station of the Kowloon–Canton Railway while the Peninsula Hotel was built on the reclamation between Kowloon station and Middle Road.

In 1929, construction of the Middle Road Children's Playground began at the eastern end of Middle Road as part of a wider suite of public works improvements in the area. This site remains a playground to this day. It was entirely rebuilt in the early 1980s by the Urban Council in tandem with the development of New World Centre across Salisbury Road. It was demolished after the site was taken over by KCR Corporation in 2001 for the construction of East Tsim Sha Tsui station beneath it, but the playground was reprovisioned over the station and reopened on 9 May 2005.

The eastern end of Middle Road was once dominated by the 10-storey Middle Road Multi-storey Car Park Building, which upon opening on 11 January 1965 was the largest multi-storey car park in Hong Kong. The car park stood directly over part of Middle Road, and was home to the Yau Tsim District Office before Yau Tsim and Mong Kok districts merged. In 2014, the government put the site, which was rezoned for commercial use, up for auction. The car park ceased operation in July 2014. In September 2014, it was announced that developer Henderson Land had won the site with a HK$4.7-billion bid. Henderson Land built a commercial tower called "H Zentre", which unlike the old car park is not built overtop of Middle Road.

The section of road beneath the Middle Road car park was originally unnamed. In May 1987, the Urban Council (then responsible for street naming) decided to treat it as a southward extension of Middle Road, thus applying the same name to it.

In the early 2000s, the Kowloon-Canton Railway was extended to a new terminus, East Tsim Sha Tsui station. To link this new station with the existing Tsim Sha Tsui station of the MTR, an extensive pedestrian subway network was built in the area. A 250-metre-long section of subway was built beneath Middle Road, spanning between the new KCR station and the Kowloon Hotel. This subway was later extended further down Middle Road to Kowloon Park Drive, where it connected to two existing government-owned subways. Today, this subway – which runs the entire east–west length of Middle Road – forms a major underground pedestrian artery.

== Features ==
Landmarks and adjoining roads, from West to East:

- > Junction with Kowloon Park Drive
- > Junction with Ashley Road
- The Salisbury YMCA of Hong Kong. At the corner of Middle Road and Kowloon Park Drive
- > Junction with Hankow Road
- Kowloon Hotel. At the corner of Middle Road (north side) and Nathan Road
- East Tsim Sha Tsui station. Exit L4
- The Peninsula Hong Kong. At the corner of Middle Road (south side) and Nathan Road
- East Tsim Sha Tsui station. Exit L3
- > Junction with Nathan Road
- 26 Nathan Road. A commercial building at the corner of Middle Road (north side) and Nathan Road
- Sheraton Hong Kong Hotel & Towers. At the corner of Middle Road (south side) and Nathan Road
- Hermes House. A commercial building
- East Tsim Sha Tsui station. Exit L1
- H Zentre. A commercial building at the former location of the Middle Road Multi-storey Car Park Building
- > Junction with Minden Row (footpath)
- Mariner's Club. At the Blackhead Point end of the street
- East Tsim Sha Tsui station. Exit K
- East Tsim Sha Tsui Station Public Transport Interchange
- Middle Road Children's Playground. Elevated, on a platform over the station
- > Junction with Salisbury Road

== See also ==
- List of streets and roads in Hong Kong
