= 26 Nathan Road =

- 彌敦道26號
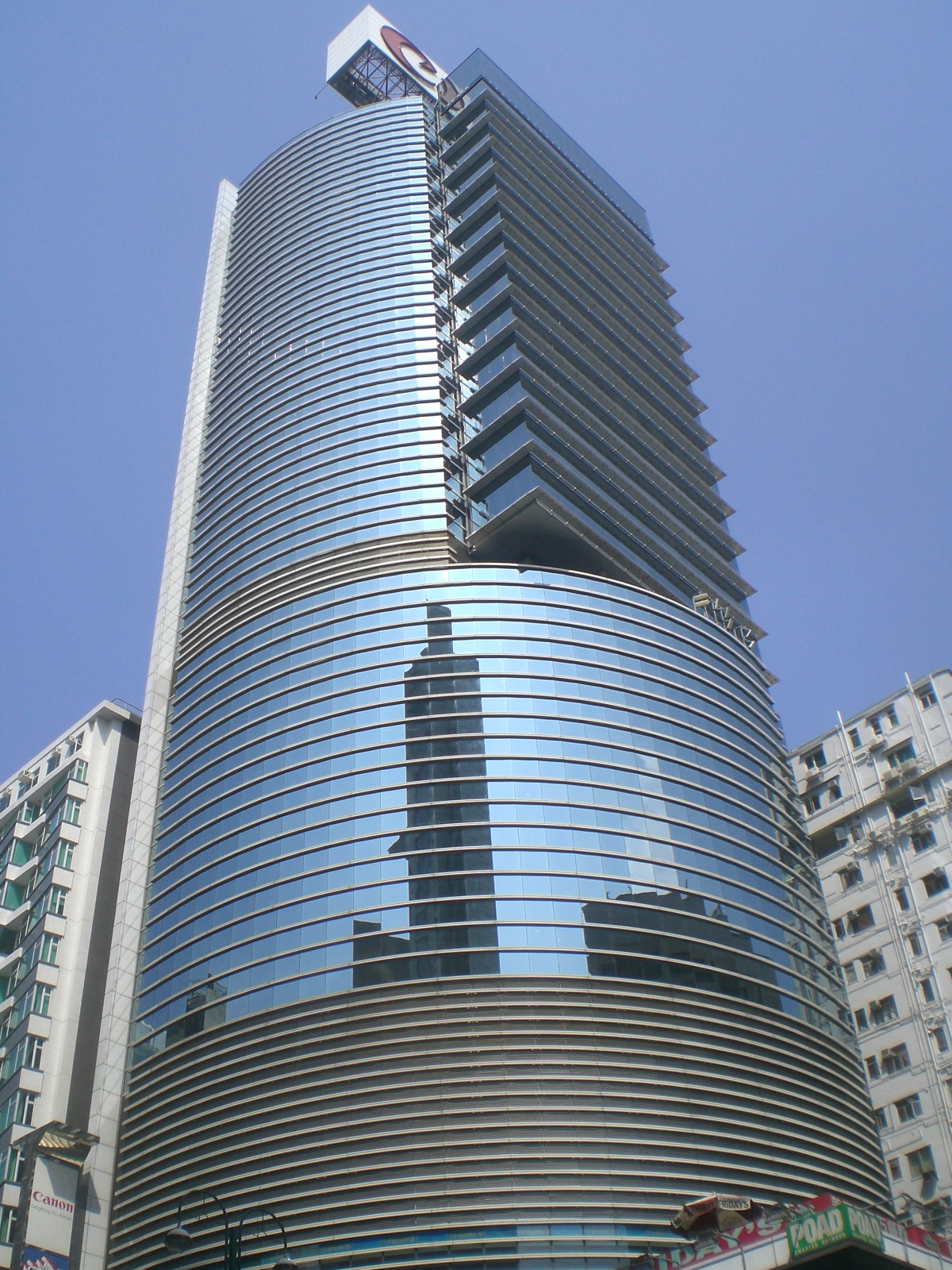
- Alternative names: Titus Square, T-square, Oterprise Square

General information
- Status: Existing/Completed
- Location: 26 Nathan Road, Tsim Sha Tsui, Yau Tsim Mong, Kowloon, Hong Kong
- Coordinates: 22.29594°N 114.17247°E
- Completed: 1997
- Cost: HK$271 million
- Height: 108.8 metres (357 ft)

Technical details
- Floor count: 28
- Floor area: 16,464 square metres (177,220 sq ft)
- Lifts/elevators: 4

Other information
- Parking: Drive Through Drop-off Area

26 Nathan Road (Chinese: 彌敦道26號), formerly known as East Enterprise Square or Oterprise Square (東企業廣場), is a commercial 28-storey commercial building that was expanded from the Ambassador Hotel in Kowloon by Sun Hung Kai Properties development. It is located at the corner of Nathan Road and Middle Road, in the Tsim Sha Tsui area of Yau Tsim Mong District, in Kowloon, Hong Kong.

== History ==
The building was designed in 1993 and completed in 1997. The total cost of construction was HK$271 million (US$35 million).

The Ambassador Hotel that previously occupied the address was built in 1961 and had a 17-story-high exterior mural of the travels of Confucius.

== Features ==
The total gross floor area (GFA) of the building is 16,464 square metres (177,220 sq ft). The building is 108.8 metres (357 ft) tall.

The building was designed as a tower block of offices above a "podium" of shops. The podium has a corridor cut diagonally across it, designed to encourage pedestrians to use it to cut the corner between Nathan Road and Middle Road, drawing them onto private property in towards the shop fronts. The corridor has a skylight ceiling, made of 12mm laminated glass.

The curved angled shape of the block in its lower levels, from floor 6 to floor 13, was designed to provide the best angle of the limited view towards the harbour, which is obscured by the neighbouring Sheraton Hotel and Peninsula Tower. Above that, the view is no longer obscured and the office shapes are more orthogonal. The curtain wall on all of these floors is 8mm silver-coated glass.

Floors 6, 7, and 14 house the building's mechanical services. There are three passenger and one cargo lifts. There is no parking, but there is a drive-through drop-off area.
