= Ganges-class ship of the line =

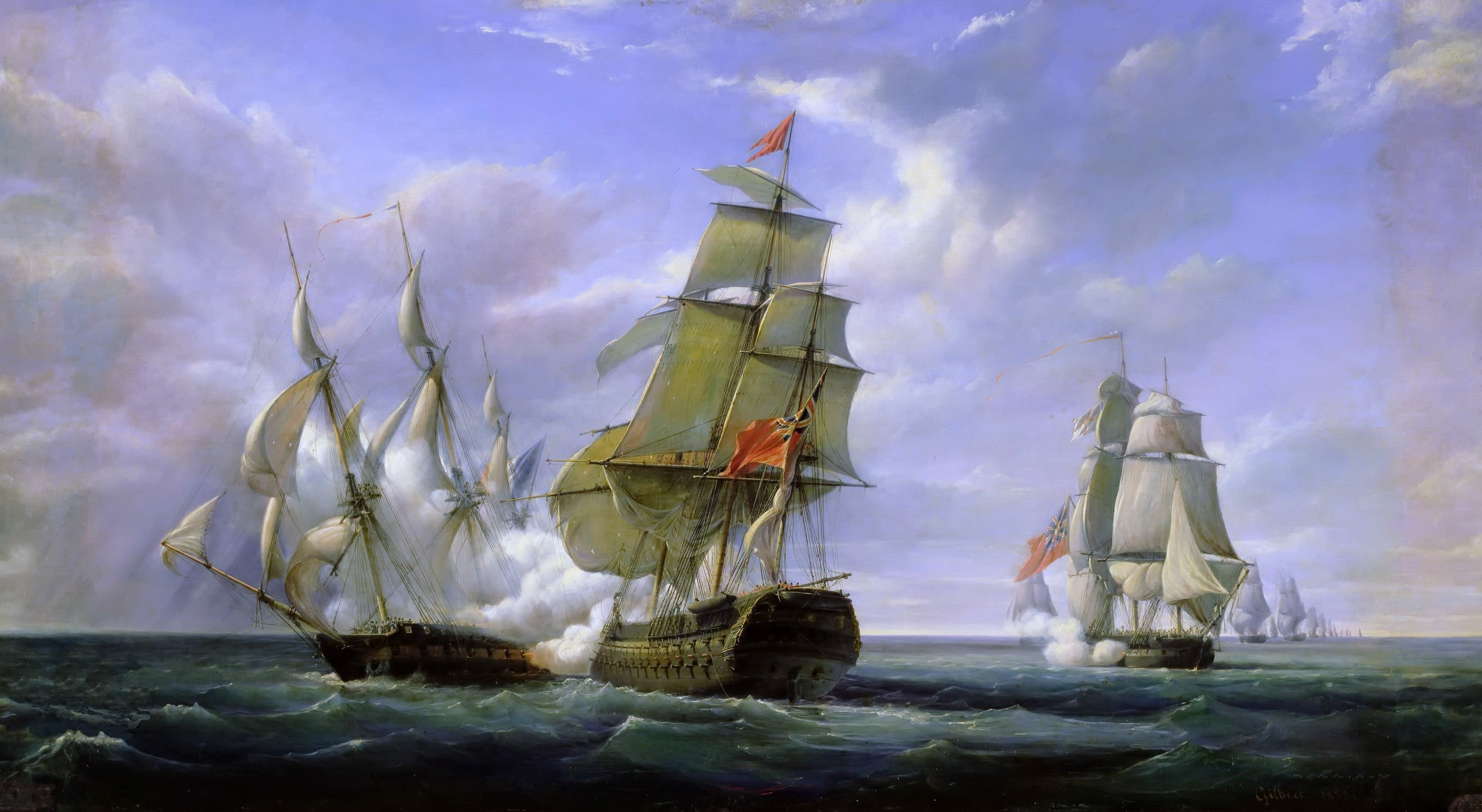
- HMS Tremendous (centre) at the action of 21 April 1806

Class overview
- Name: Ganges
- Operators: Royal Navy
- Preceded by: Alfred class
- Succeeded by: Courageux class
- In service: 30 March 1782 - 1897
- Completed: 6

General characteristics
- Type: Ship of the line
- Length: 169 ft 6 in (51.66 m) (gundeck); 138 ft 7 3/4 in (42.3 m) (keel)
- Beam: 47 ft 8 1/2 in (14.5 m)
- Propulsion: Sails
- Armament: 74 guns: Gun deck: 28 × 32-pounders; Upper gun deck: 28 × 18-pounders; Quarter deck: 14 × 9-pounders; Forecastle: 4 × 9-pounders
- Notes: Ships in class include: Ganges, Culloden, Tremendous, Invincible, Minden, Minotaur

The Ganges-class ships of the line were a class of six 74-gun third rates, designed for the Royal Navy by Sir Edward Hunt in 1779.

== Ships ==
- HMS Ganges

Builder: Randall, Rotherhithe
Ordered: 14 July 1779
Launched: 30 March 1782
Fate: Broken up, 1816

- HMS Culloden

Builder: Randall, Rotherhithe
Ordered: 12 July 1779
Launched: 16 June 1783
Fate: Broken up, 1813

- HMS Tremendous

Builder: Barnard, Deptford
Ordered: 1 January 1782
Launched: 30 October 1784
Fate: Sold out of the service, 1897

- HMS Invincible

Builder: Woolwich Dockyard
Ordered: 25 June 1801
Launched: 15 March 1808
Fate: Broken up, 1861

- HMS Minden

Builder: Lovji Nusserwanjee Wadia, Duncan Docks, Bombay
Ordered: 9 July 1801
Launched: 19 June 1810
Fate: Sold out of the service, 1861

- HMS Minotaur

Builder: Chatham Dockyard
Ordered: 3 December 1811
Laid Down: December 1812
Launched: 15 April 1816
Fate: Hulked, 1842, Broken up 1869
