= Blackhead Point =

Cape in Hong Kong

Coordinates: 22°17′46″N 114°10′27″E

Signal Hill Garden
- 訊號山花園
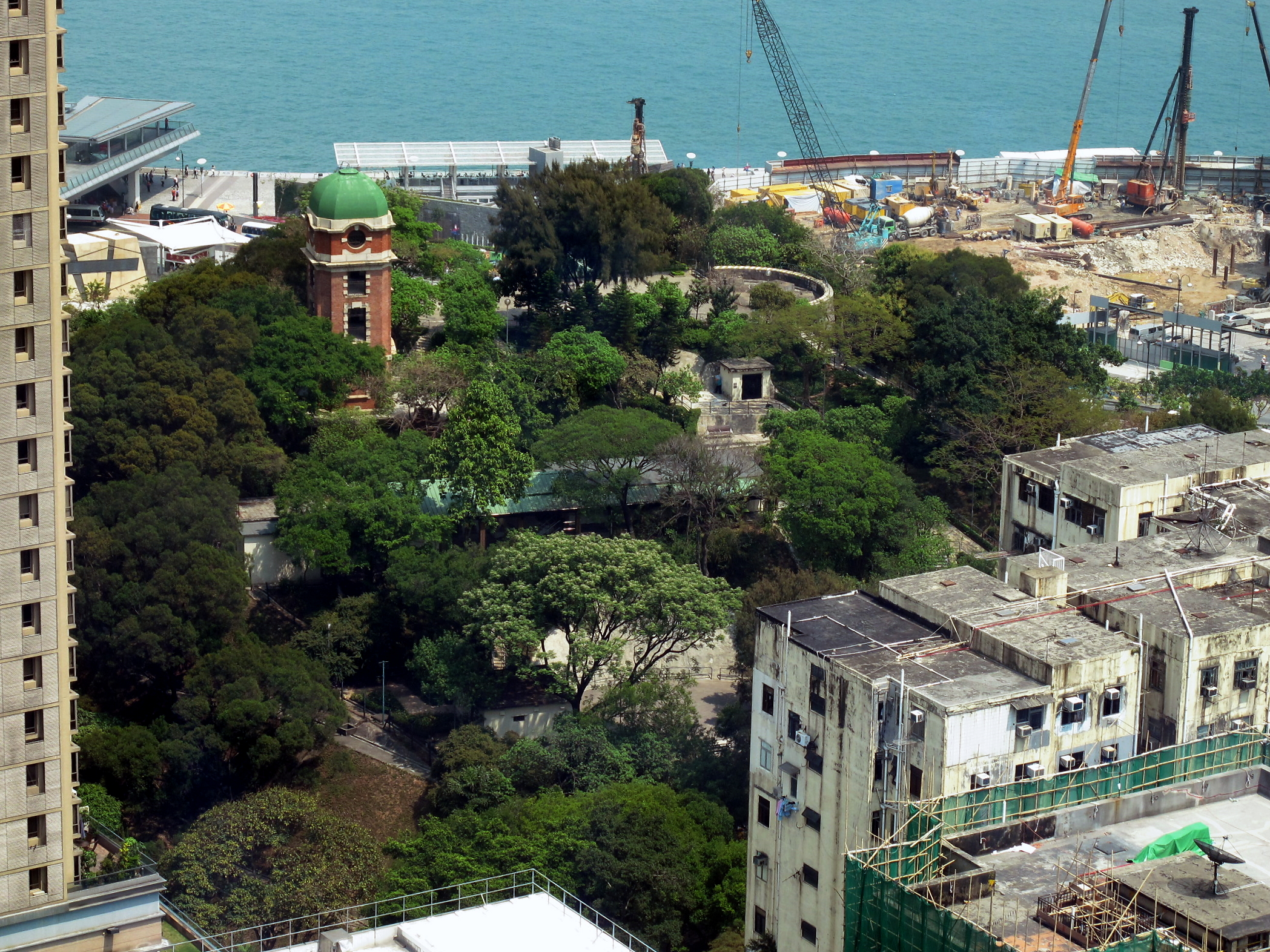
- Aerial view
- Interactive map of Signal Hill Garden
- Location: Tsim Sha Tsui, Kowloon
- Area: 1.3 hectares (3.2 acres)
- Opened: 20 August 1974; 51 years ago
- Operator: Leisure and Cultural Services Department (since 2000), Urban Council and Urban Services Department (until 31 December 1999)
- Open: Year round
- Public transit: Tsim Sha Tsui station

Blackhead Point
- Traditional Chinese: 黑頭山
- Simplified Chinese: 黑头山
Transcriptions
Standard Mandarin
- Hanyu Pinyin: Hēi tóu shān
Yue: Cantonese
- Yale Romanization: Hāk tàuh sāan
- Jyutping: Hak1 tau4 saan1

Tai Pau Mai
- Chinese: 大包米
Transcriptions
Standard Mandarin
- Hanyu Pinyin: Dà bāo mǐ
Yue: Cantonese
- Yale Romanization: Daaih bāau máih
- Jyutping: Daai6 baau1 mai5

Signal Hill
- Traditional Chinese: 訊號山
- Simplified Chinese: 讯号山
Transcriptions
Standard Mandarin
- Hanyu Pinyin: Xùn hào shān
Yue: Cantonese
- Yale Romanization: Seun houh sāan
- Jyutping: Seon3 hou6 saan1

Blackhead Point (Chinese: 黑頭山; lit. 'black head hill'), also known as Tai Pau Mai (大包米; 'large bag of rice') indigenously, or by the names Tsim Sha Tsui Point and Signal Hill (訊號山), was a cape before any land reclamation took place in Tsim Sha Tsui, Kowloon, Hong Kong. It currently remains a small hill near the coast.

Signal Hill is about 40 metres (130 ft) high and measures approximately 110 metres (360 ft) from east to west, and 80 metres (260 ft) from north to south. It is the site of Signal Hill Garden and features the Signal Hill Tower as well as remains of military structures.

== Etymology ==
Blackhead Point was named after a German businessman in Hong Kong named Friedrich Johan Berthold Schwarzkopf, who naturalised as a British citizen and anglicised his name as 'Blackhead'.

The name used by local residents for the Hill was Tai Pau Mai (大包米; 'large bag of rice') because it was believed that the hill resembled a large bag of rice.

== Signal Hill Tower ==
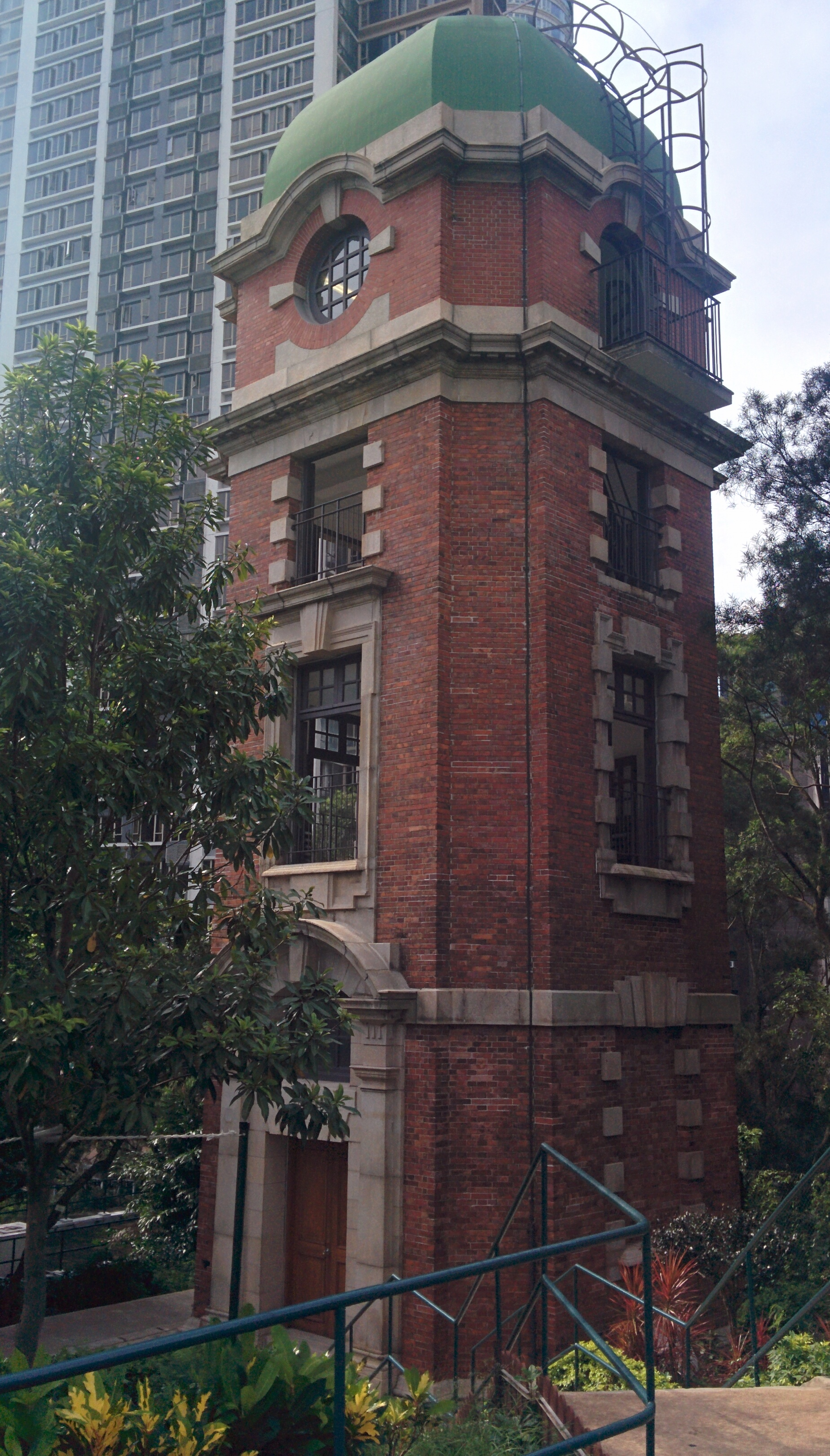
Signal Hill Tower 2019

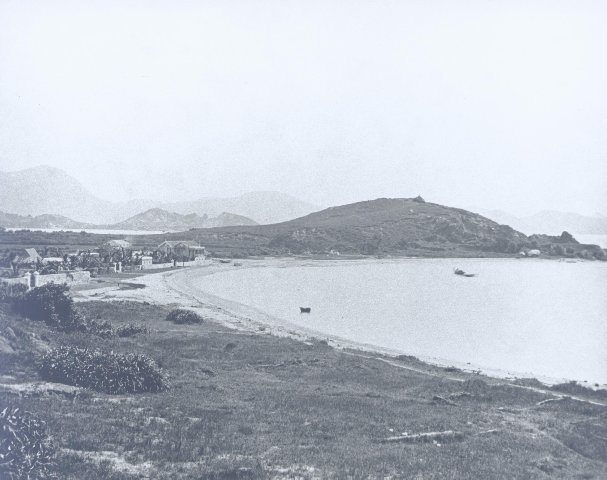
Tsim Sha Tsui Bay and Blackhead Point in 1870.

The Signal Hill Tower (訊號塔) was built in the Edwardian style in 1907 at the top of the hill. It was originally a three-storey building. The tower stood at 12.8 metres (42 feet) tall, with a red brick facade. Then, another storey was added to the structure in 1927 for clearer view of the tower from incoming vessels, this heightened it to 18.9 m (62 ft). The windows of the added storey features round windows whereas the original floors have square windows. Prior to the addition, the roof of the building was flat. A dome-shaped roof painted light green was built in replacement. There was a 5 1/2-metre-long (18-foot) mast which used to contain the time ball atop the building.

The purpose of the tower was to house a time ball apparatus of the Hong Kong Observatory previously located in the nearby Marine Police Headquarters Compound. The apparatus operated in the building from January 1908 to June 1933, dropping once daily from 1908 to 1920, and twice a day from 1920 to 1933. The dropping of the time ball ceased on 30 June 1933 as the building itself was in disrepair, short of staff, and the method used to check the marine chronometers had become obsolete, in comparison with radio-telegraphy and telephony.

During World War II, Signal Hill Tower was used as a temporary ammunition store.

The Urban Council restored the tower in the 1970s. The building was designated a Grade II historic building in 1981 and was upgraded to a Grade I historic building on 18 December 2009. On 23 October 2015, the tower was also declared a monument.

== Signal Hill Battery ==
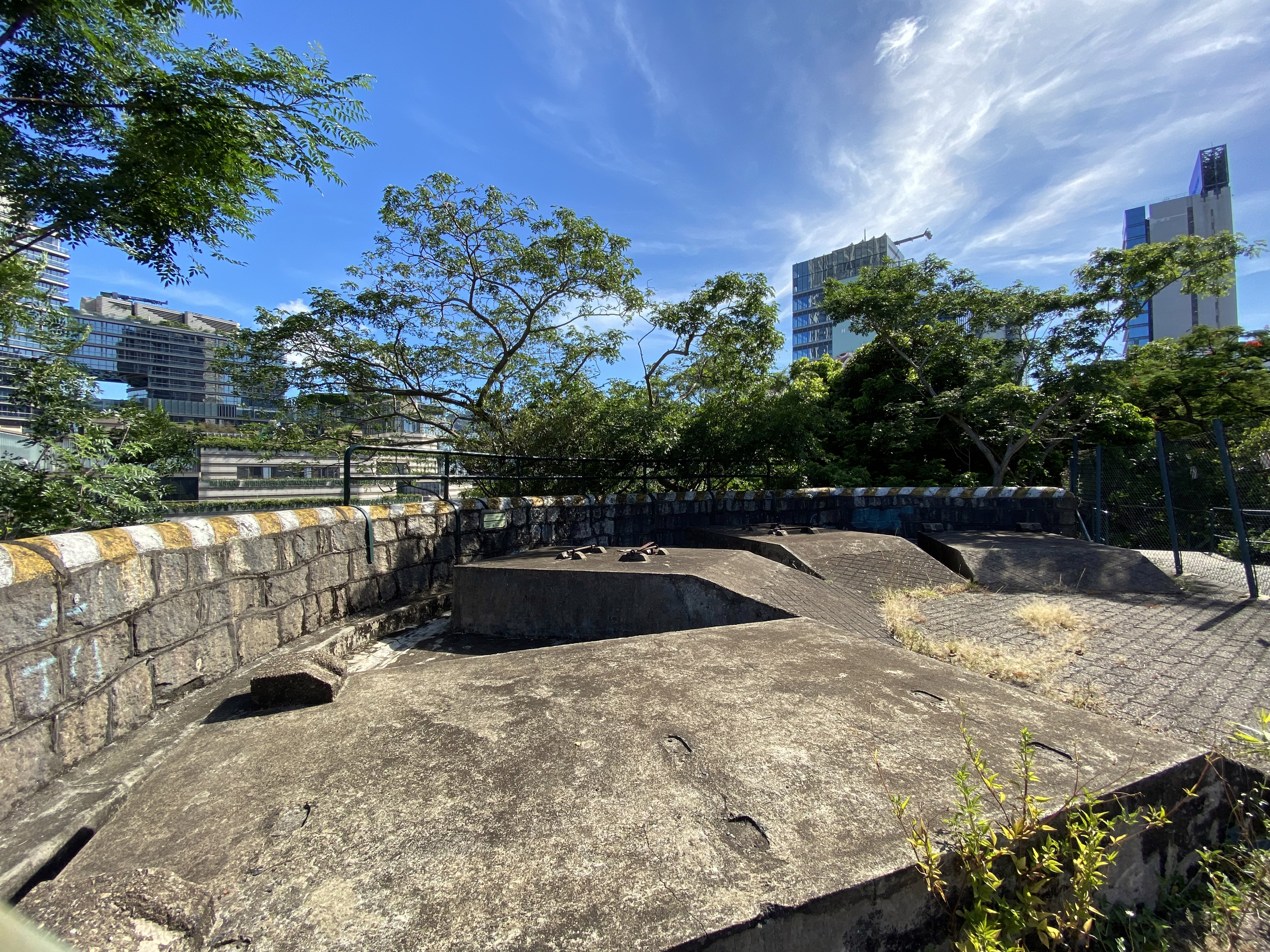
Remains of Signal Hill Battery. Four concrete gun emplacements on Signal Hill.

Anti-aircraft guns may have been located at the south side of the hill. Later, four British 25-pound cannons used for ceremonial salute were located in concrete gun emplacements facing Victoria Harbour.

== Today ==
The site was allocated to the Urban Council in 1973 and made a park, called the Signal Hill Garden (訊號山花園), which was officially opened on 20 August 1974. Signal Hill Tower is still standing and is now a declared a monument. A small building in the park, now repurposed as a toilet, was where typhoon signals were hoisted in Hong Kong as it was located on the highest hill near the middle of Victoria Harbour. The entrance of the park is at Minden Row.

The Signal Hill Garden is adjacent to the Middle Road Children's Playground. However, the two parks are not contiguous and one cannot walk to the other without first exiting to the street. Note that the opening hours (for 2019) for the Tower are: 9:00 am - 11:00 am and 4:00 pm - 6:00 pm daily.

== Gallery ==
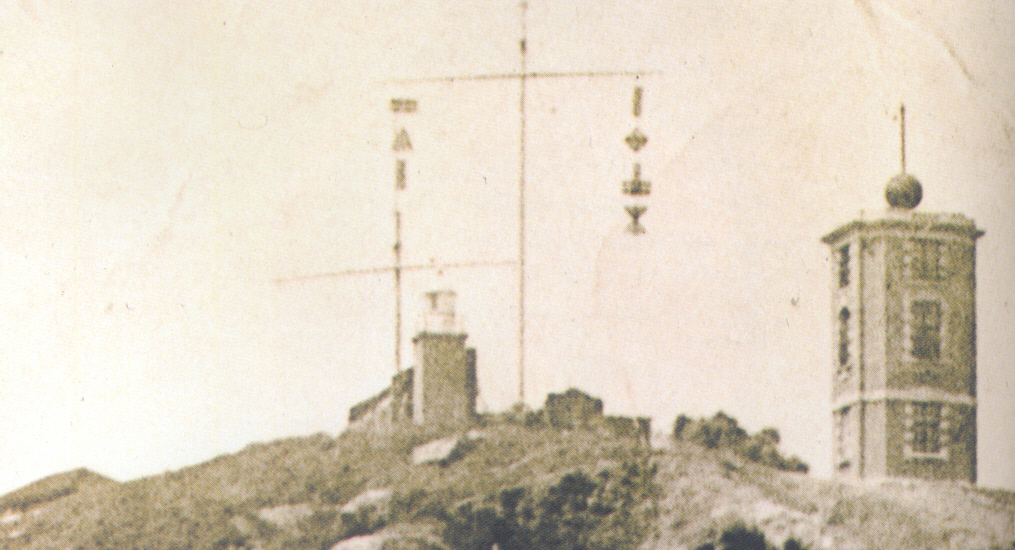
Signal Hill Tower and the timeball before the additional storey was added.

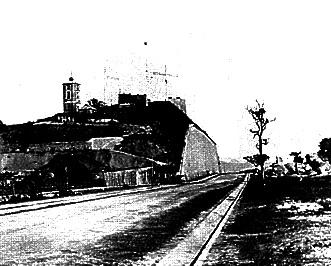
The time ball tower in 1908.

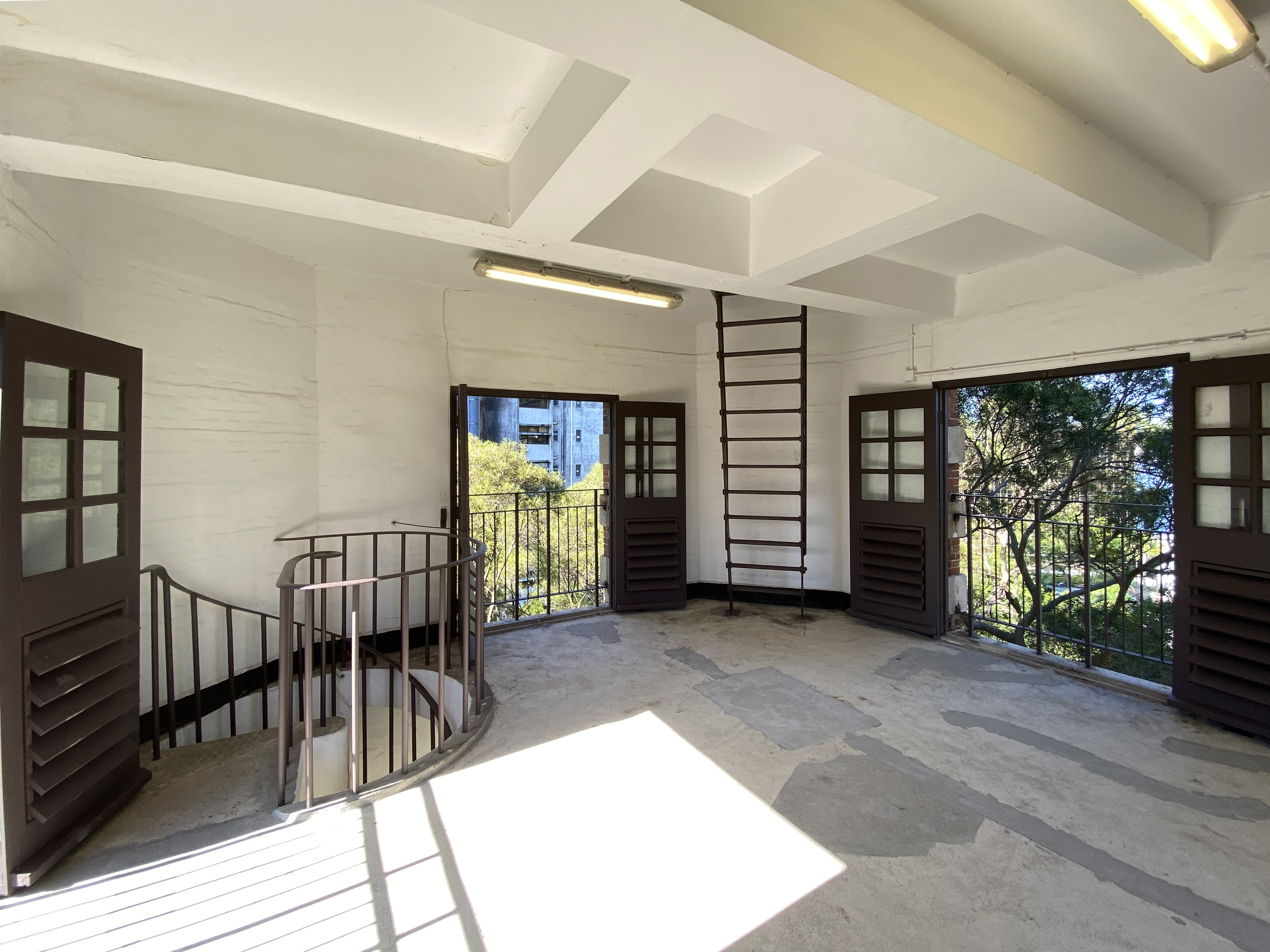
Interior of Signal Tower in 2020

== See also ==
- Middle Road, Hong Kong
- Mariner's Club
