= Xiqu =

Xiqu may refer to:

- Chinese opera (戲曲, Xìqǔ)

== Places in China ==
- Xi District (西区, Xīqū), a district of Panzhihua, Sichuan
- Xiqu Subdistrict, Zhongshan (西区街道), a subdistrict of Zhongshan, Guangdong
- Xiqu Subdistrict, Gujiao (西曲街道), a subdistrict of Gujiao, Shanxi
- Xiqu, Gansu (西渠), a town in Minqin County, Gansu

== Places in Taiwan ==
- West District, Chiayi (西區, Xīqū)
- West District, Taichung (西區, Xīqū)

== See also ==
- West District (disambiguation)
- Xiqu Centre, a performing art theater in West Kowloon Cultural District, Hong Kong
