= 西 =

西, meaning "west", may refer to:

- Radical 146 in the Kangxi Dictionary system of classifying Chinese characters
- Nishi (surname), Japanese surname
- Xi (surname), Chinese surname

== See also ==
- Nishi-ku (disambiguation), various districts in Japan
- Seo-gu (disambiguation), various districts in South Korea
- 西山 (disambiguation) ("west mountain")
- 西海 (disambiguation) ("west sea")
- 西湖 (disambiguation) ("west lake")
