= Kwun Chung =

Kwun Chung 官涌
- Neighbourhood
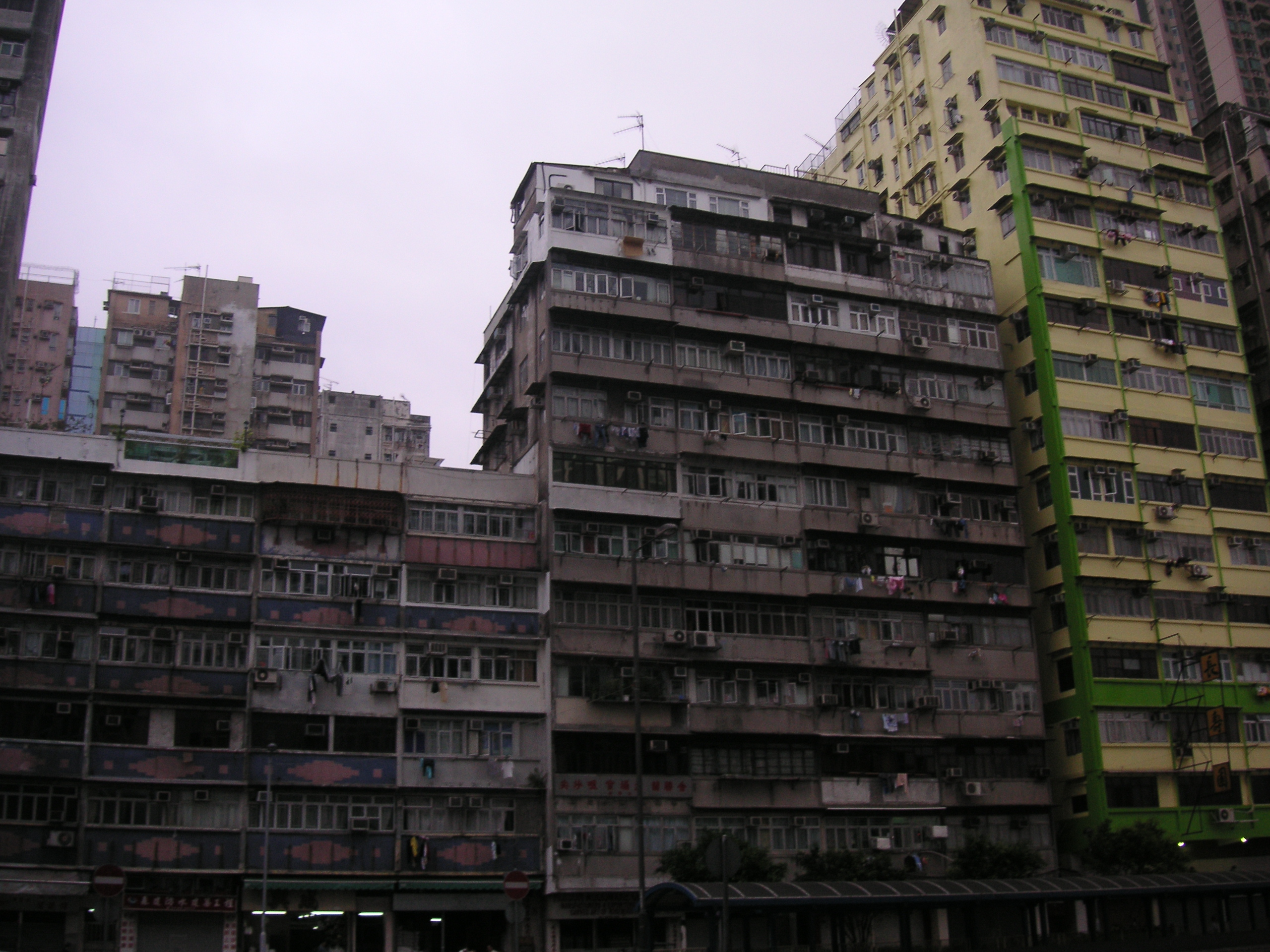
- A few residential blocks in Kwun Chung
- Country: Hong Kong
- Area: Kowloon
- District: Yau Tsim Mong

Kwun Chung
- Chinese: 官涌
- Cantonese Yale: Gūn chūng
- Literal meaning: 'Governor's creek'
Transcriptions
Standard Mandarin
- Hanyu Pinyin: Guānchōng
Hakka
- Romanization: Gon^{1} cung^{2}
Yue: Cantonese
- Yale Romanization: Gūn chūng
- Jyutping: Gun1 cung1

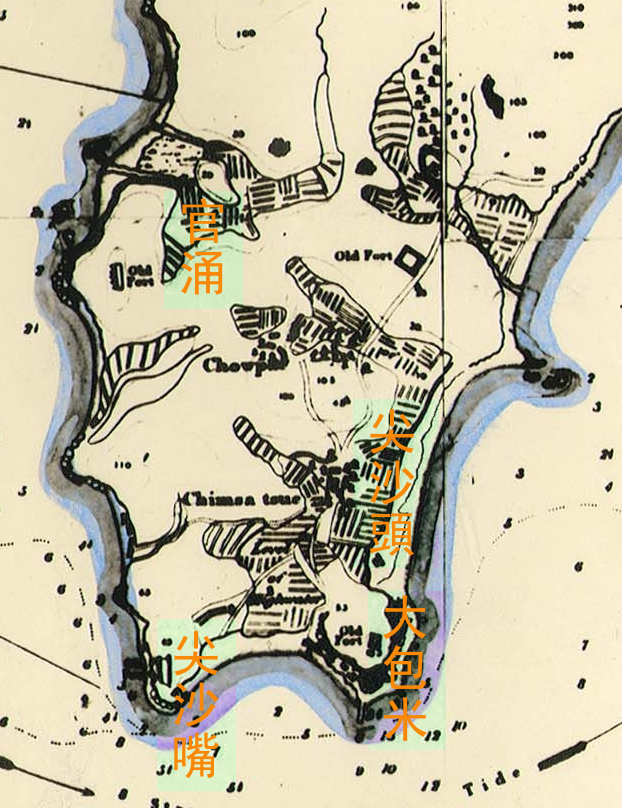
Kwun Chung, in the upper middle of the map, is a valley with cultivation. To its west is Kwung Chung Fort.

Kwun Chung, or Koon Chung in early documents, is an area of Hong Kong, Yau Ma Tei or Tsim Sha Tsui located in the Yau Tsim Mong District.

In 1979, the MTR station running through Kwun Chung was named Jordan since it intersected Jordan Road and nearby bus stops were also relabelled Jordan. This resulted in the area being called Jordan by residents, since most MTR stations are named after the district or area in which it serves.

== History ==
Its Chinese name literally means "government creek", which was named for the pre-19th century presence of Imperial China's military in defence against pirates and foreigners. Since Hong Kong was sparsely populated during the time, this referenced name may have superseded any local name. In early British maps, Kwun Chung was a river valley north of a series of hills called Napiers Range with a namesake village and cultivation. The valley extended from the shore to the middle of the Kowloon Peninsula. In the middle of the valley was a hill where two rivers ran west to the sea.

=== Kwun Chung Fort ===
The area between Austin Road and Jordan Road was originally used as a fortification by the military of the Qing dynasty during the 19th century. In 1839, Qing official Lin Zexu ordered the construction of a fortification in the area to defend against possible British attacks. When the First Opium War broke out, the fortification, along with another fort in Tsim Sha Tsui, saw action against British forces during the Battle of Kowloon.

On 4 November 1839, British troops engaged in repeated attacks in the Battle of Kwun Chung. Lin Zexu fought back head-on, winning six skirmishes over the next 10 days.

The fort, along with the hill it was based on, were both demolished for development during the early period of British rule in Kowloon; the rock and sand leftover from the demolition were used for land reclamation in the area situated northwest of Jordan Road. Due to its strategic position, the British garrison in Hong Kong chose the hill south of Austin Road to build the Whitfield Barracks and Kowloon West II Battery. Battery Street was probably named after it.

== Demography ==
While the majority population is Cantonese and other ethnic Chinese, Kwun Chung also contains Nepalese, mostly from ex-Gurkhas, and other South Asian populations.

== Arts and culture ==
Residents of Kwun Chung maintain practice of the Ghost Festival.

== Landmarks ==
- King George V Memorial Park, Kowloon
- Kwun Chung Market
