= Yau Tsim Mong District =

District in Kowloon, Hong Kong

Yau Tsim Mong 油尖旺區
- District
- Yau Tsim Mong District
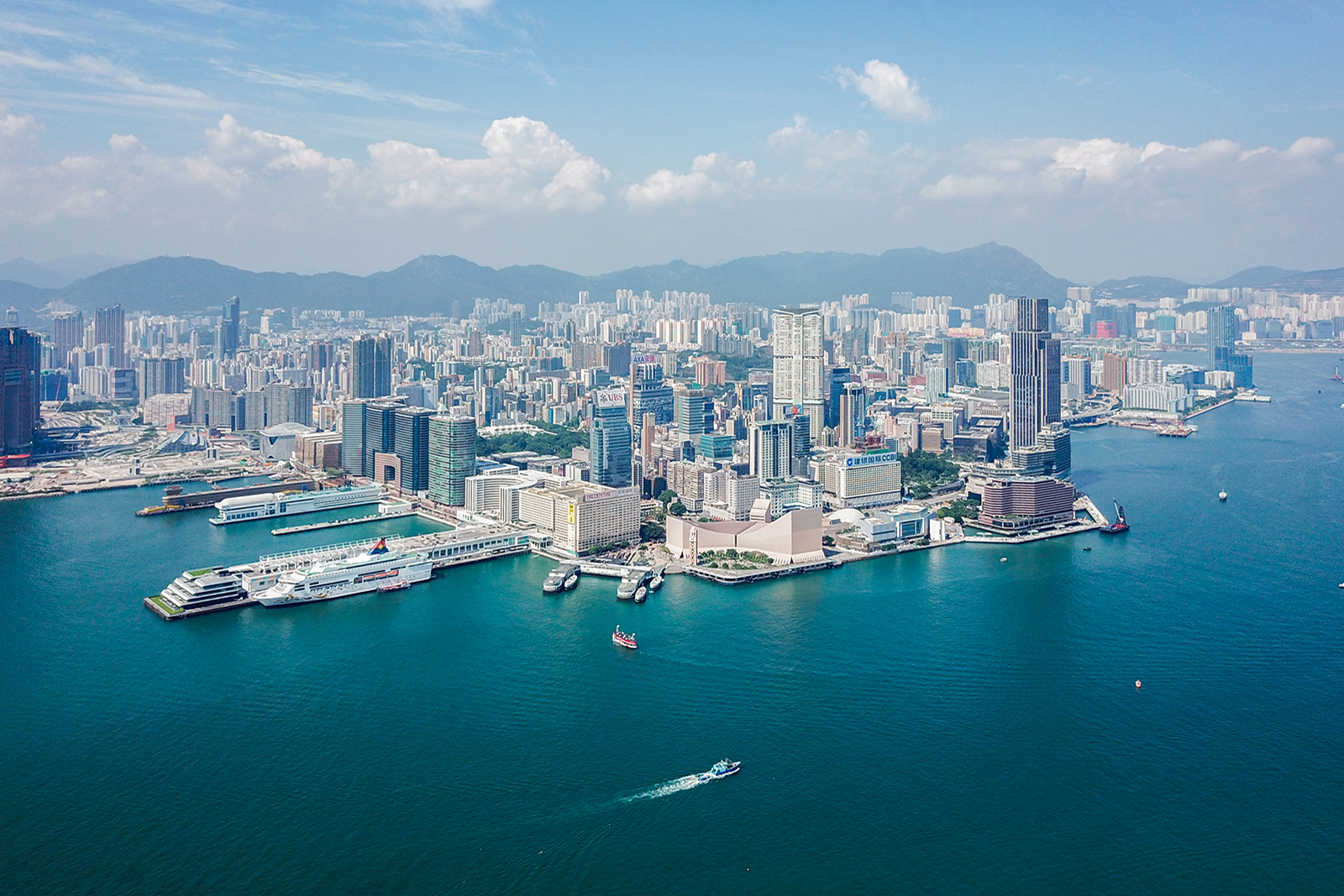
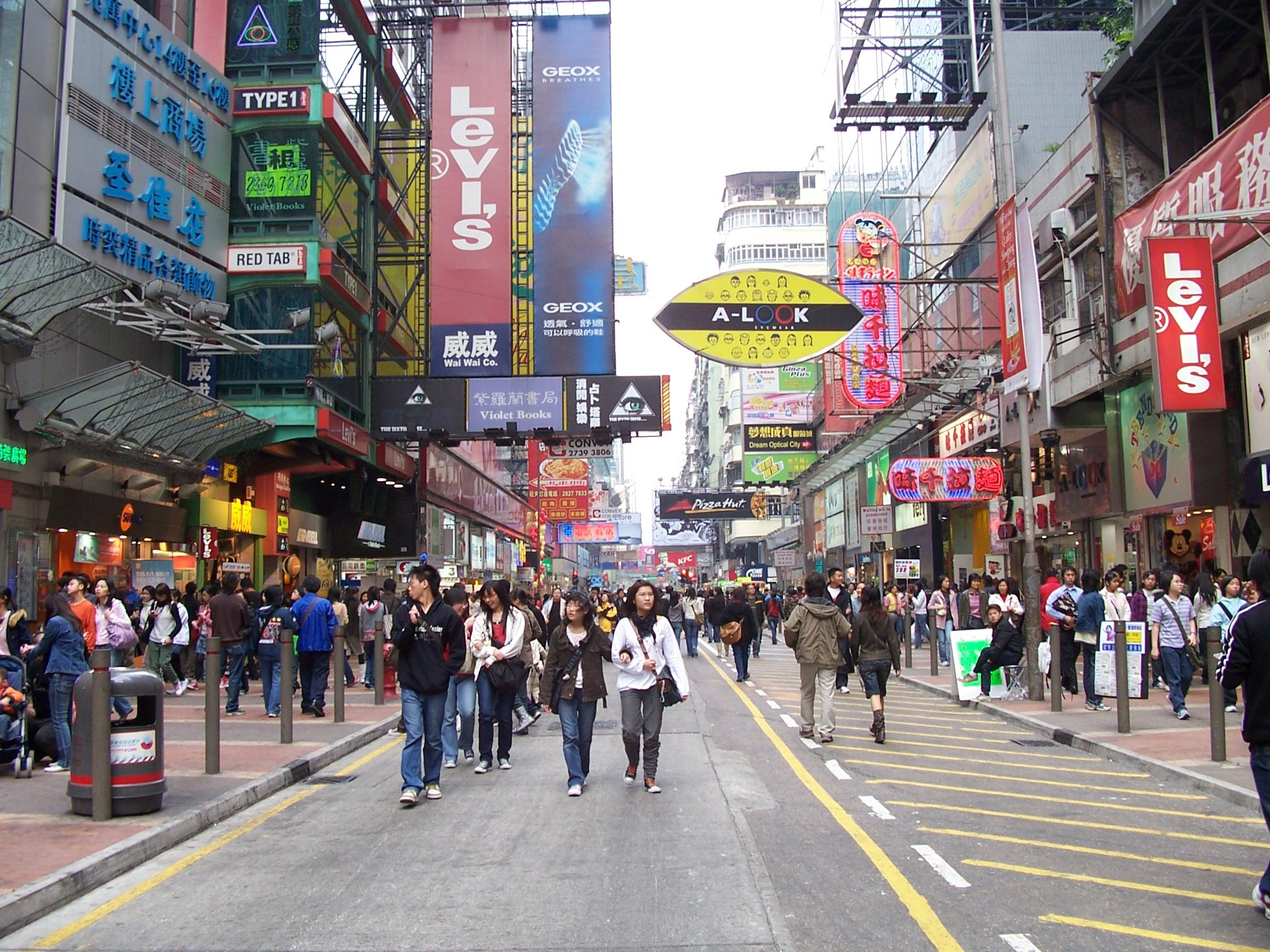
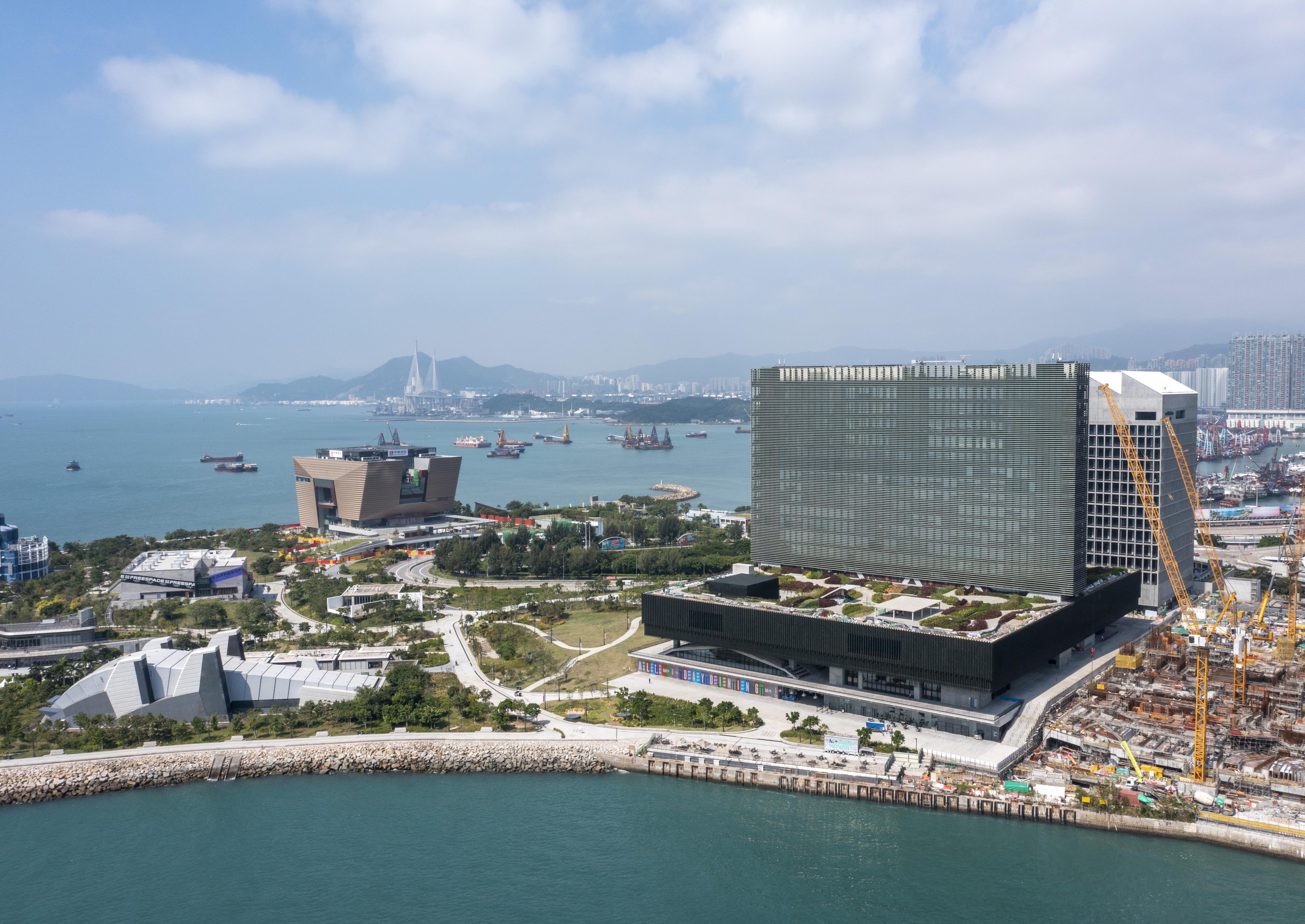
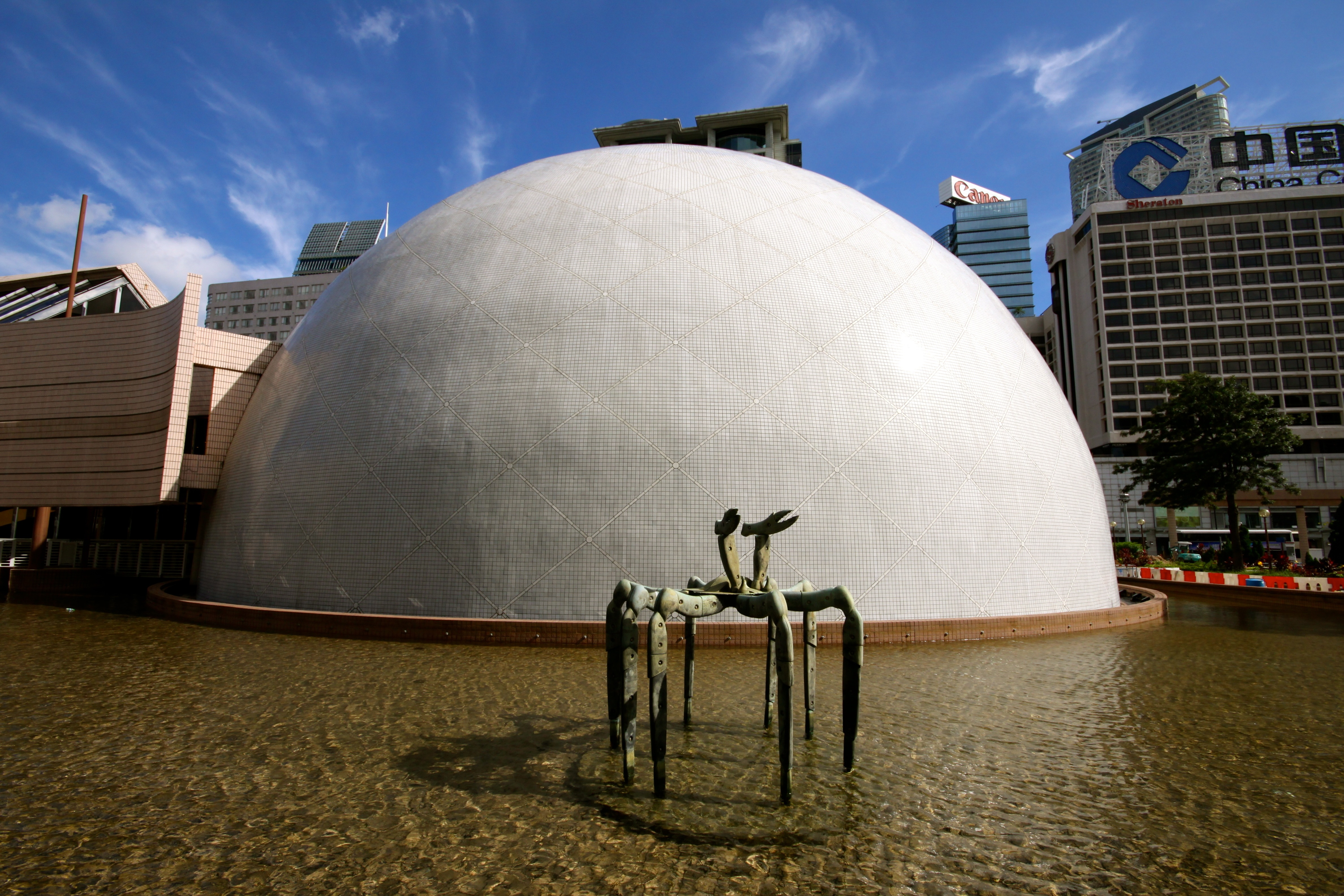
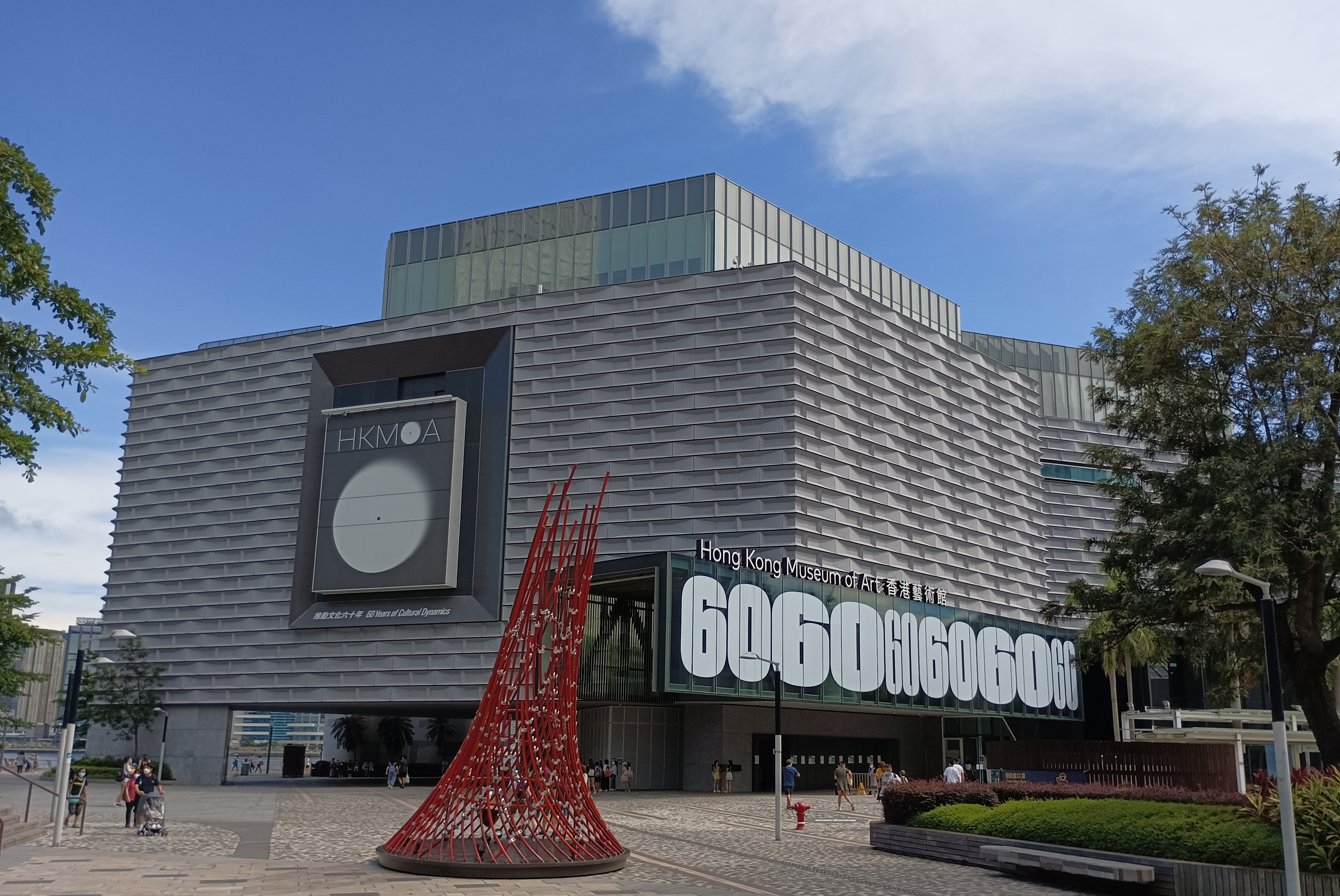
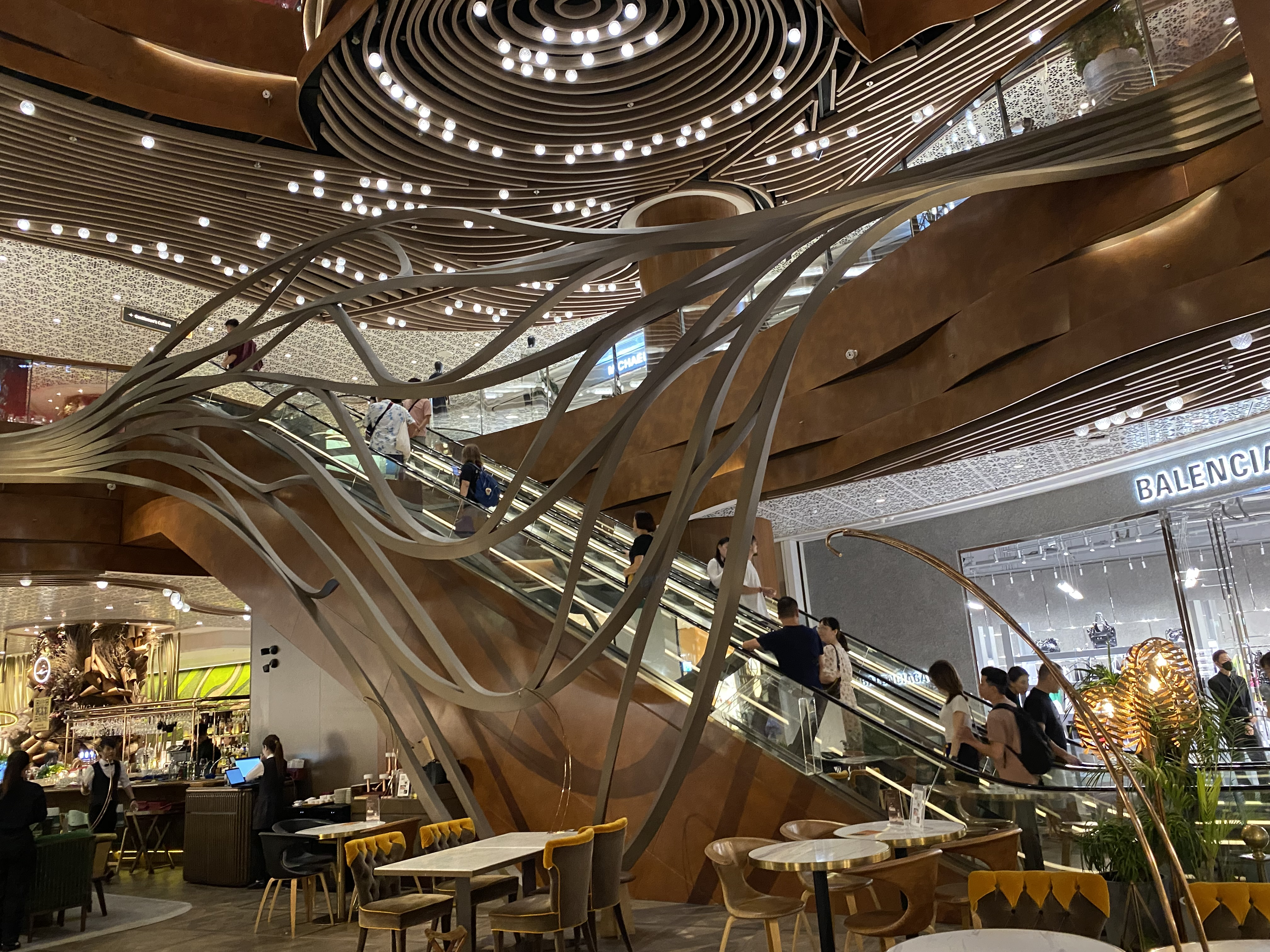
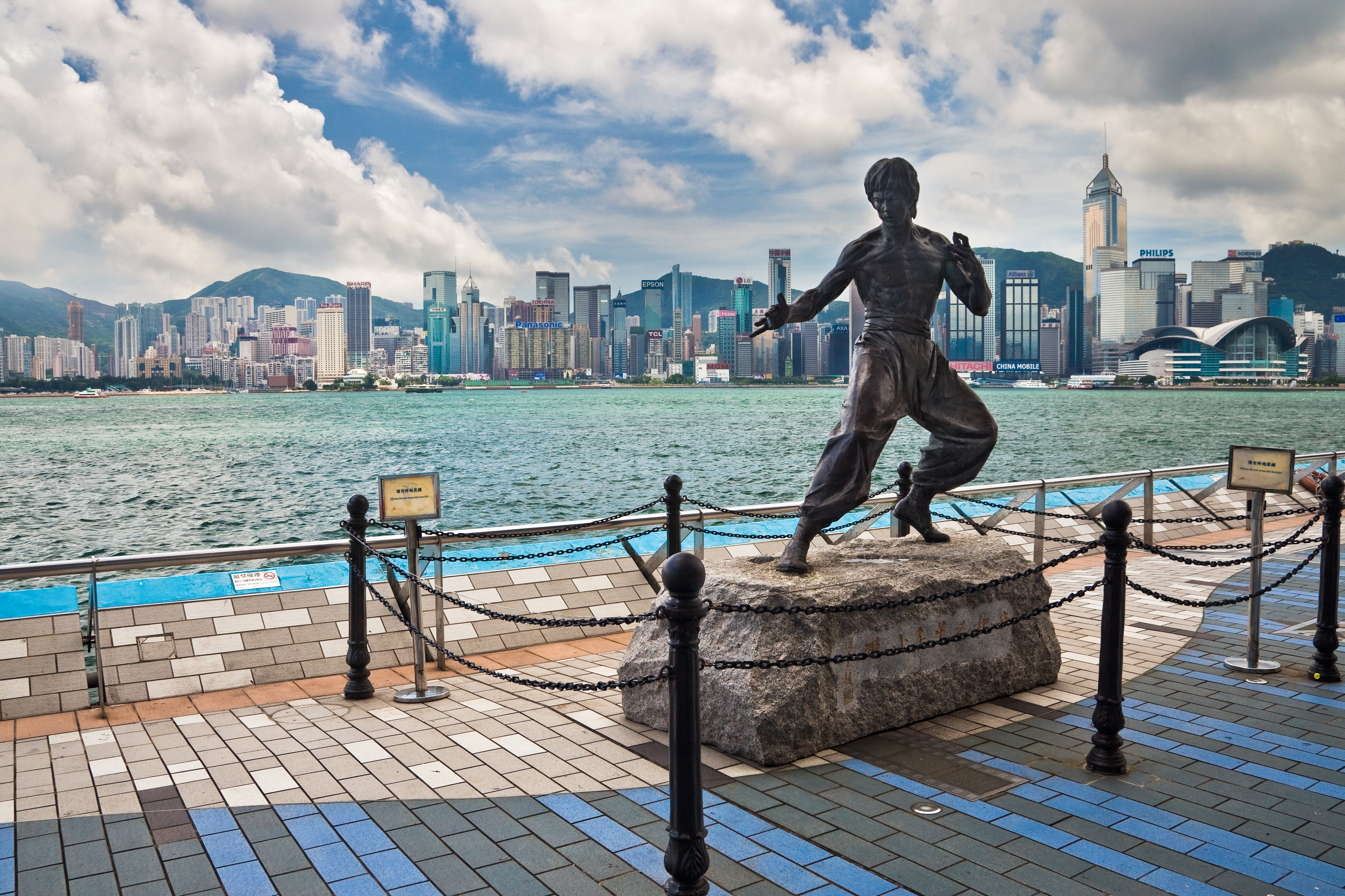
- Tsim Sha Tsui skyline Mong Kok West Kowloon Cultural District Hong Kong Space Museum Hong Kong Art Museum K11 Musea at Victoria Dockside Statue of Bruce Lee at the Avenue of the Stars

- Location of Yau Tsim Mong within Hong Kong
- Coordinates: 22°19′17″N 114°10′21″E
- Statutorily-defined area: Kowloon
- Region: Hong Kong (special administrative region)
- Country: China
- Constituencies: 16‌

Government
  - District Council Chairman: Lam Kin Man (Independent)
  - District Council Vice-Chairman: Chu Tsz-Lok
  - District Officer: Aron Laura Liang

Population (2021)
  - Total: 310,647: 82.8% Chinese; 7.4% South Asian; 3.9% Filipino
  - Density: 44,045/km^{2} (114,080/sq mi)
- Time zone: UTC+8 (Hong Kong Time)
- Largest neighbourhood by population: Tai Kok Tsui (49,668 – 2016 est)
- Location of district office and district council: 30 Luen Wan Street‌, Mong Kok
- Website: Yau Tsim Mong District Council

Yau Tsim Mong District
- Traditional Chinese: 油尖旺區
- Simplified Chinese: 油尖旺区
- Cantonese Yale: Yàuhjīmwohng kēui
Transcriptions
Standard Mandarin
- Hanyu Pinyin: Yóu-Jiān-Wàng Qū
Wu
- Wugniu: yeu^{2} tsie^{1} waon^{6} chiu^{1}
- IPA: Shanghainese: [ɦiɤ˨ tɕi˧ ɦuɑ̃˨ tɕʰy˩]
Yue: Cantonese
- Yale Romanization: Yàuhjīmwohng kēui
- Jyutping: jau^{4} zim^{1} wong^{6} keoi^{1}
- IPA: [jɐw˩.tsim˥.wɔŋ˨ kʰɵɥ˥]

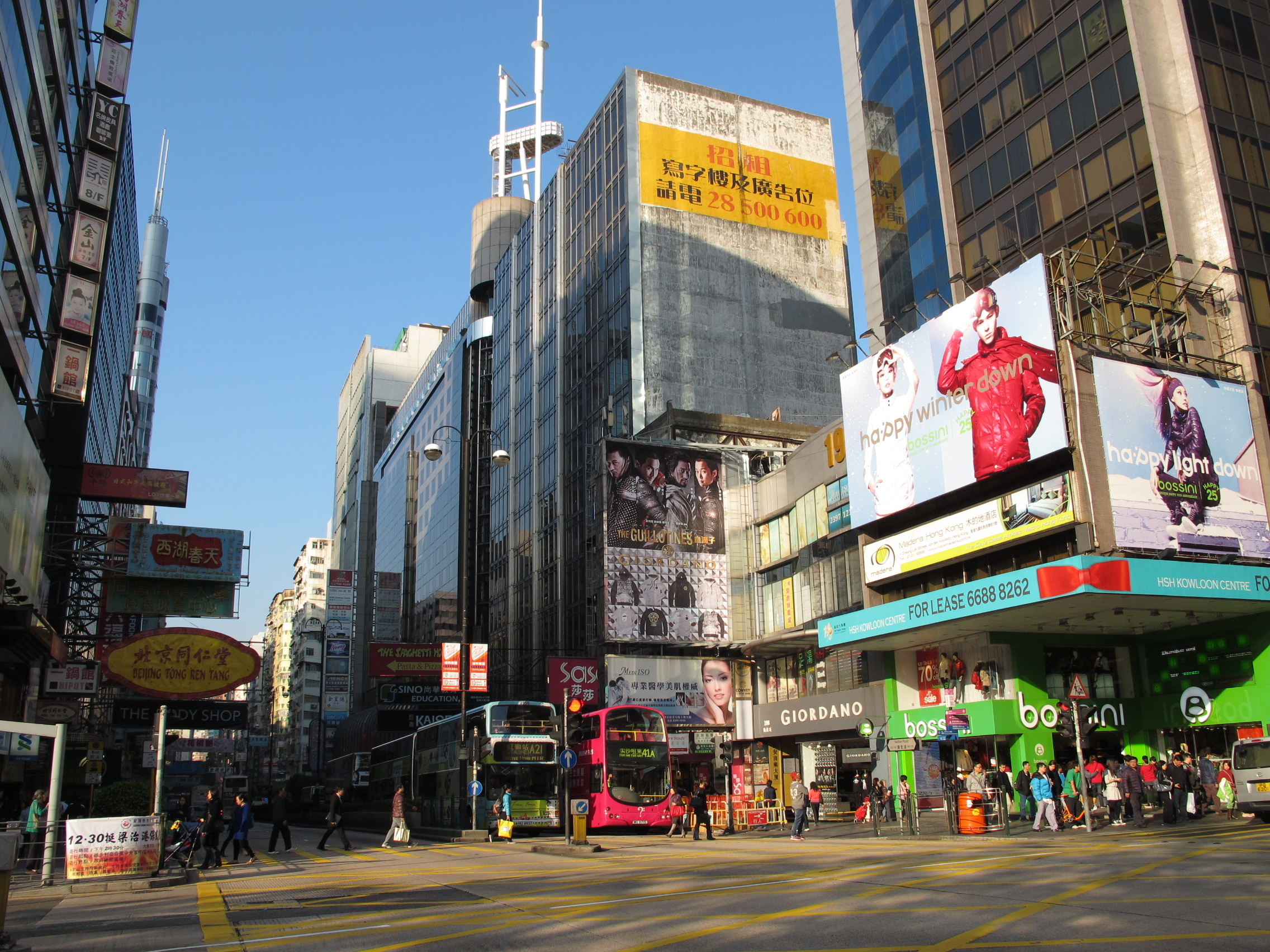
Nathan Road, a major thoroughfare of Yau Tsim Mong District

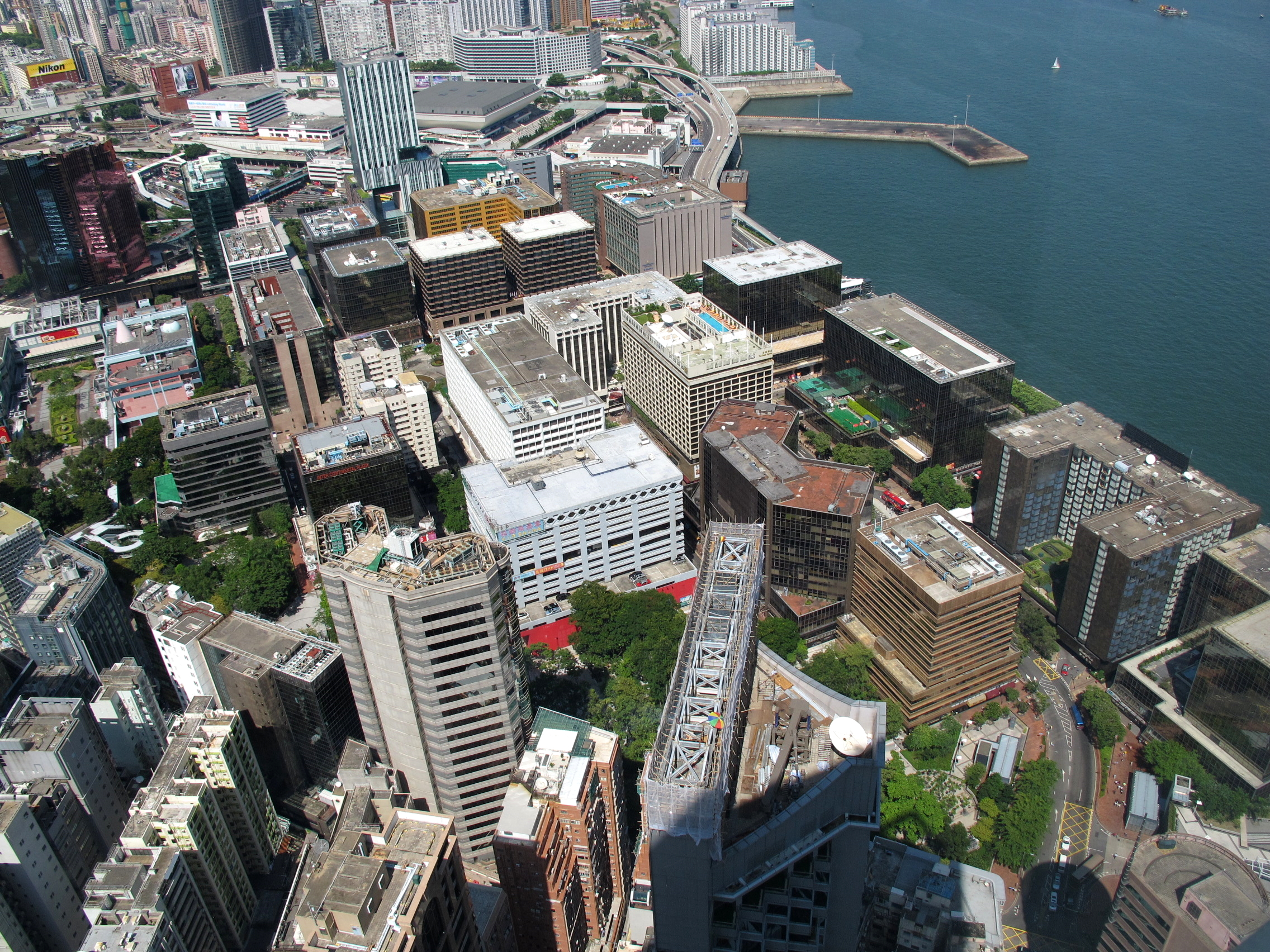
Tsim Sha Tsui East

Yau Tsim Mong District is one of 18 districts of Hong Kong, located on the western part of Kowloon Peninsula. It is the core urban area of Kowloon. The district has the second highest population density of all districts, at 49,115 km^{2} (18,963 sq mi). The 2016 By-Census recorded the total population of Yau Tsim Mong District at 342,970.

Yau Tsim Mong District contains the urban areas of Yau Ma Tei, Tsim Sha Tsui, and Mong Kok, as well as Ferry Point, King's Park, Kwun Chung, Tai Kok Tsui, Tsim Sha Tsui East, the Union Square and Kowloon Point. Formerly two districts, the Yau Tsim District and Mong Kok District, it was combined in 1994. Its name is an acronym of the three aforementioned major areas.

== History ==
The district was once called Yau Ma Tei District. It was renamed Yau Tsim District from 1 April 1988 to "remove any misconception that Tsim Sha Tsui was an administrative district separate from Yau Ma Tei".

Yau Tsim District and Mong Kok District were merged in 1994 to form the new Yau Tsim Mong District.

== Areas within the district include ==
Kowloon Peninsula (West)
Tai Kok Tsui		Prince Edward
MTR Olympic station	Mong Kok	
Mong Kok West	Yau Ma Tei	
MTR Kowloon station	Jordan; Kwun Chung	King's Park
Sea	Tsim Sha Tsui	Tsim Sha Tsui East

== Transport ==
=== MTR ===
Six MTR lines serve this district: the Tsuen Wan line, Kwun Tong line, Tung Chung line, East Rail line, Tuen Ma line and the Airport Express.

- Tsuen Wan line and Kwun Tong line converge from the north at Prince Edward station, then Mong Kok and Yau Ma Tei the line's last station in the district and continue its journey to Whampoa. Tsuen Wan line continued to Jordan and Tsim Sha Tsui stations before crossing the harbour to Hong Kong Island.
- Tung Chung line has two stations along the west coast: Kowloon near Jordan and Olympic near Tai Kok Tsui. The former station is also served by the Airport Express.
- East Rail line has a station in Mong Kok East, while Hung Hom is on the boundary between Yau Tsim Mong and Kowloon City districts.
- Tuen Ma line and converge from the north at Austin station, then East Tsim Sha Tsui station and Hung Hom the line's last station in the district and continue its journey to Ma On Shan.

=== Major roads ===
- Nathan Road
- Shanghai Street
- Austin Road
- Canton Road
- Cross-Harbour Tunnel
- West Kowloon Highway
- Western Harbour Crossing
- Salisbury Road

== Education ==
Schools in Yau Tsim Mong District include:

- Sir Ellis Kadoorie Secondary School (West Kowloon)
- Diocesan Girls' School
- Mount Kelly Hong Kong

Universities

- Hong Kong Polytechnic University

Hong Kong Public Libraries maintains the following public libraries in this district: Fa Yuen Street, Tai Kok Tsui, Tsim Sha Tsui, and Yau Ma Tei.

== See also ==
- List of areas of Hong Kong
- Kowloon peninsula
