= Mak Man Kee Noodle Shop =

Restaurant in Hong Kong

Coordinates: 22.3047241°N 114.1683157°E

- Interactive map of Mak Man Kee Noodle Shop

Restaurant information
- Established: 1957
- Food type: Noodles
- Location: Parkes Street, Hong Kong

Mak Man Kee Noodle Shop (Chinese: 麥文記麵家), on Kowloon peninsula is a traditional Guangdong restaurant specialising in wonton noodle. It is located in Parkes Street, near Jordan MTR station in Hong Kong. It is considered a "must-stop spot" for the wonton noodle by The Essential Kowloon, and was awarded a star in the Michelin Guide in 2017.

The business was founded in 1957 as a dai pai dong. It has since moved indoors, and celebrated its 50th anniversary in May 2007.

Its recipe for the Cantonese noodles, hand-made using just flour and eggs (including duck eggs), is traditional, and has remained unchanged since the business was founded by the father of the current owner. The soup base is aimed to be tasty, without excessively drowning out the taste of the wonton noodles, and no monosodium glutamate is used.

The "wonton noodle" is synonymous with wonton and noodles served in piping hot bouillon. However, the restaurant's menu includes combinations of noodles' accompaniments in addition to or instead of the traditional wonton, and which may be served in a bouillon, or dry (捞麵).

A bowl of wonton noodles costs HK$21 as at June 2007, and aficionados are willing to travel some considerable distance to dine in relatively packed and spartan premises, and will often queue up outside in preference to nearby restaurants serving similar fare at about $10 a bowl. The restaurant received its Michelin Star in 2017.
