= Austin station (MTR) =

MTR station in Kowloon, Hong Kong

Austin 柯士甸
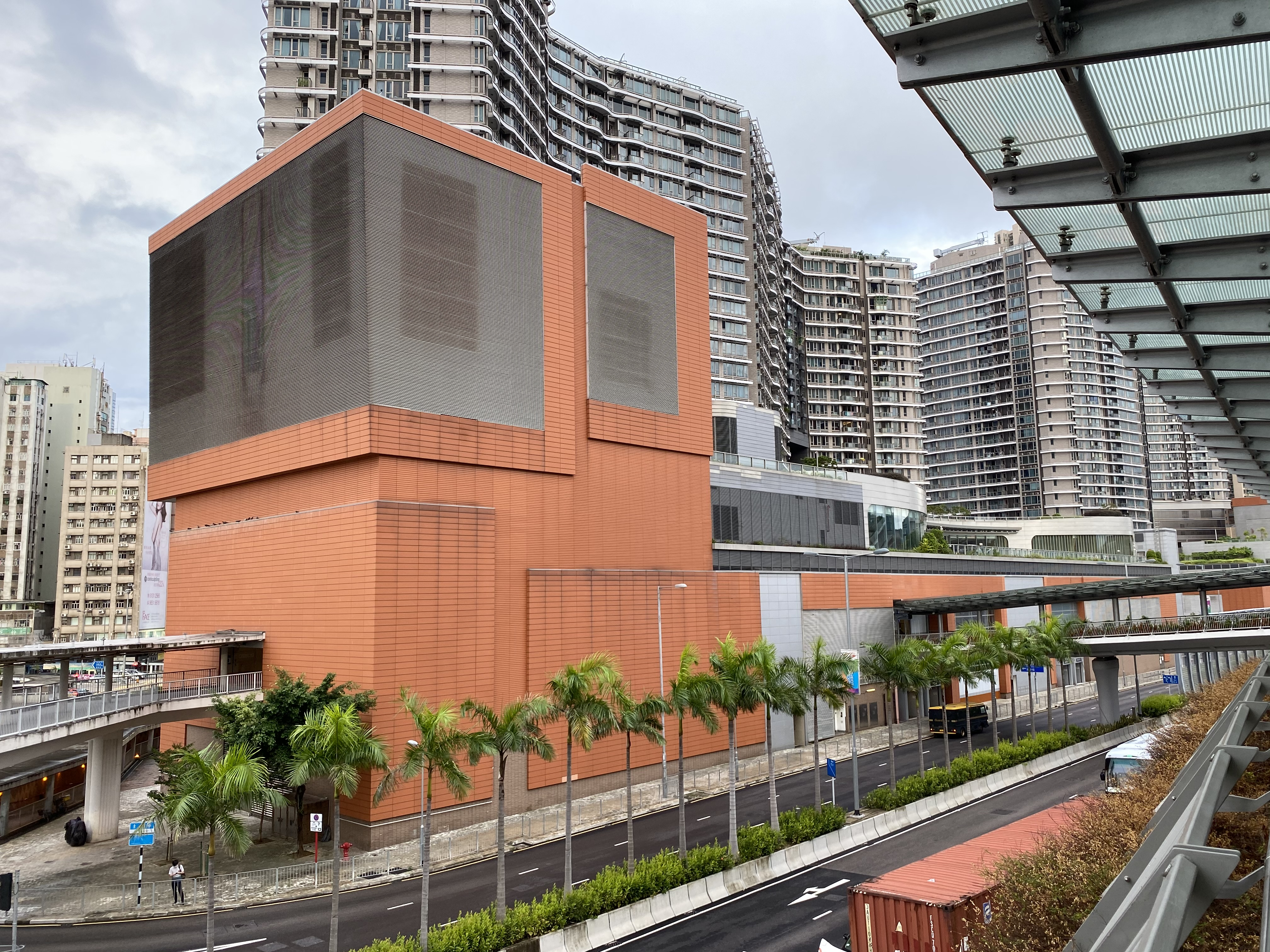
- Exterior of station building in August 2020

Chinese name
- Chinese: 柯士甸
- Cantonese Yale: Ōsihdīn
- Literal meaning: Austin
Transcriptions
Standard Mandarin
- Hanyu Pinyin: Kēshìdiàn
Yue: Cantonese
- Yale Romanization: Ōsihdīn
- Jyutping: O1si6din1

General information
- Location: Wui Man Road, Jordan, Hong Kong; Yau Tsim Mong District, Kowloon; Hong Kong
- Coordinates: 22°18′17″N 114°09′59″E
- System: MTR rapid transit station
- Owner: KCR Corporation
- Operator: MTR Corporation
- Line: Tuen Ma line
- Platforms: 2 (1 island platform)
- Tracks: 2
- Connections: Kowloon (out-of-station interchange): Tung Chung line; Airport Express; West Kowloon; Bus, minibus

Construction
- Structure type: Underground
- Depth: 18 m (59 ft)
- Accessible: Yes

Other information
- Station code: AUS

History
- Opened: 16 August 2009; 17 years ago
- Former names: Ferry Point

Services
Preceding station	MTR	Following station
Nam Cheong towards Tuen Mun	Tuen Ma line	East Tsim Sha Tsui towards Wu Kai Sha
Transfer at Kowloon
Hong Kong Terminus	Tung Chung line transfer at Kowloon	Olympic towards Tung Chung
Hong Kong Terminus	Airport Express transfer at Kowloon	Tsing Yi towards AsiaWorld–Expo
Transfer at West Kowloon
Preceding station	China Railway High-speed	Following station
Futian towards Guangzhou South	Guangzhou–Shenzhen–Hong Kong XRL transfer at West Kowloon	Terminus
Futian towards Beijing West	Beijing–Guangzhou–Shenzhen–Hong Kong high-speed railway transfer at West Kowloon	Terminus
Route map
Location
- Location within MTR Location within Hong Kong urban core

Austin is an underground MTR rapid transit station on the Tuen Ma line in Hong Kong, situated perpendicular to Wui Cheung Road and Austin Road West, and formerly adjacent to Jordan Road Ferry Pier Bus Terminus.

== History ==
Austin station was built as part of the Kowloon Southern Link project, built to connect the West Rail line and East Rail line. KCR Corporation originally planned two stations along the new section of line: Austin and Canton Road stations. The latter station was cancelled due to failed negotiations with private landowners. As a result, Austin was the only new station built as part of the Kowloon Southern Link scheme. It is also the first KCR-owned station to be opened after the MTR took over operations of the KCR network.

During the planning and early construction stages, the station was called "West Kowloon station" (Chinese: 九龍西站). The construction contract KDB200 (West Kowloon Station and Tunnels – Jordan Road to East Tsim Sha Tsui Station) was awarded to the Leighton-Balfour Beatty-Kumagai-John Holland Joint Venture (renamed to "Link 200 Joint Venture" on 9 August 2005) for an estimated contract sum of HK$2.018 billion. This station is part of this contract. Construction was finished in July 2009 and the station opened on 16 August that year. It was named after Austin Road.

It was located adjacent to the Canton Road Government Offices until that structure was demolished in 2011. An MTR residential property development, The Austin, was subsequently constructed on the site of the former government offices.

A direct connection between Austin station and the West Kowloon Terminus was opened on 23 September 2018.

A new underground pedestrian link between Austin station and Xiqu Centre, a Chinese opera house, was opened on 21 March 2021.

On 27 June 2021, the West Rail line officially merged with the Ma On Shan line (which was already extended into the Tuen Ma line Phase 1 at the time) in East Kowloon to form the new Tuen Ma line, as part of the Shatin to Central link project. Hence, Austin was included in the project and is now an intermediate station on the Tuen Ma line.

== Station layout ==
1	Northern concourse	Exit B4, B5, footbridge to Jordan Road, Hong Kong West Kowloon railway station, Elements, Kowloon station
1	Southern concourse	Exit D4, footbridge to Hong Kong West Kowloon railway station, Staff-only area
G	Northern concourse	Exit B, Wui Cheung Road
G	Southern concourse	Exit D, Wui Man Road, transport interchange, taxi stand
S	Austin Road West subway	Exit F, subway to Austin Road, Austin Road West, Canton Road, The Victoria Towers, China Ferry Terminal
C	Concourse	Customer services, MTR Shops, toilets, Exit A, C, E
C	Jordan Road subway	Subway to Canton Road, Jordan Road, Ferry Street
P	Platform 1	Tuen Ma line towards Tuen Mun (Nam Cheong)
P	Island platform, doors will open on the right
P	Platform 2	Tuen Ma line towards Wu Kai Sha (East Tsim Sha Tsui)

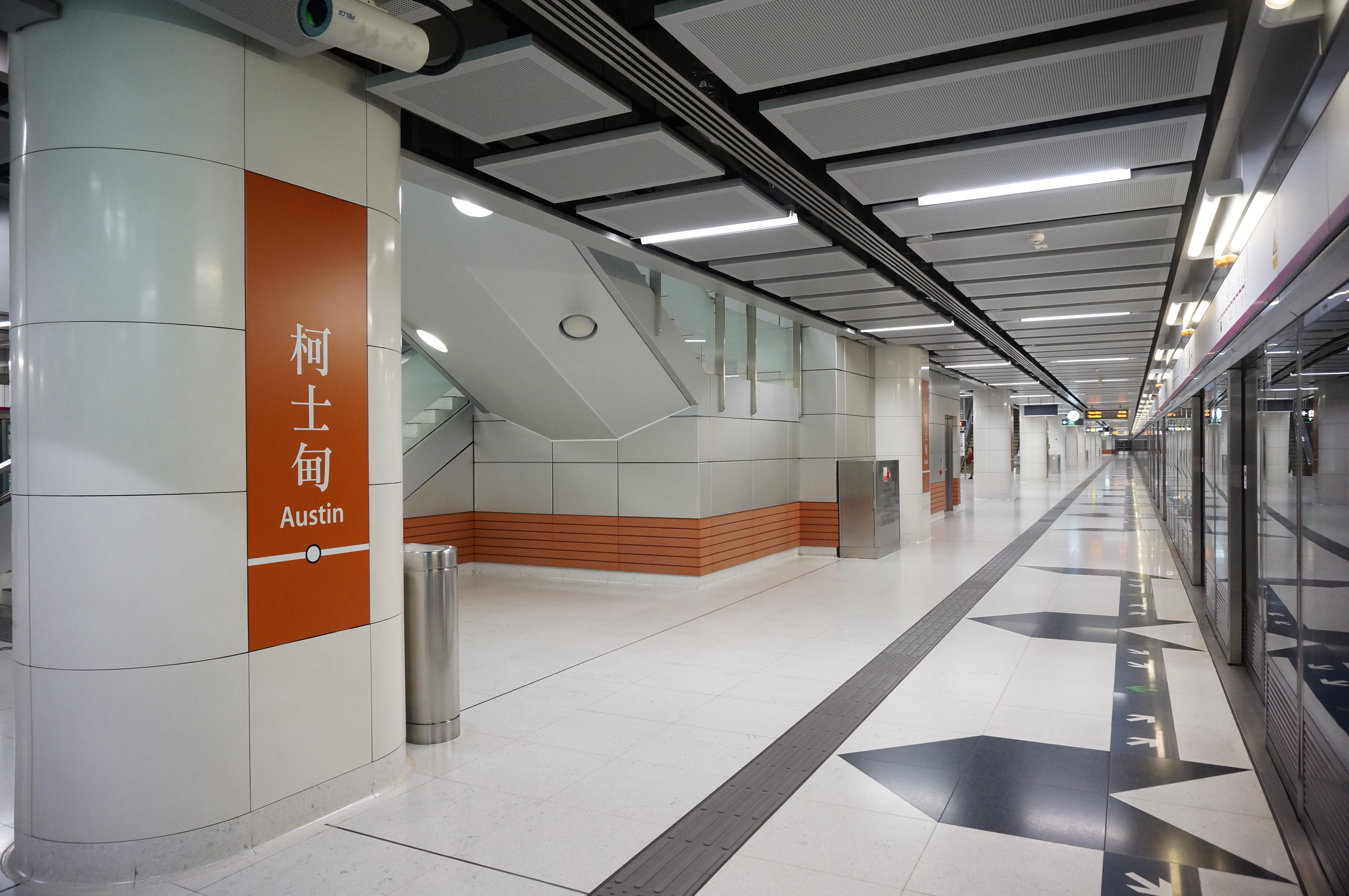
Platform 1 of Austin station in April 2014

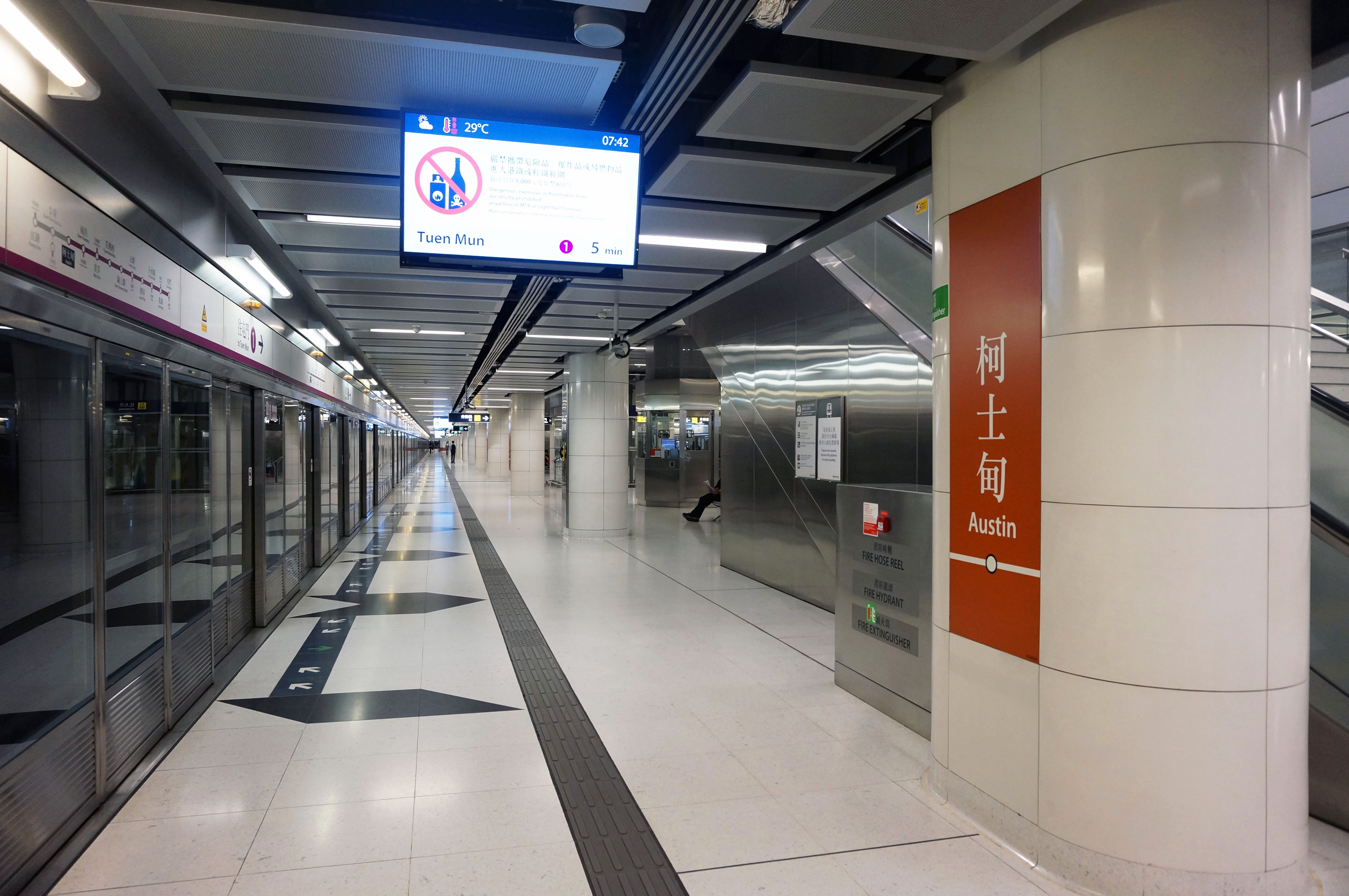
Platform 1 of Austin station in July 2017

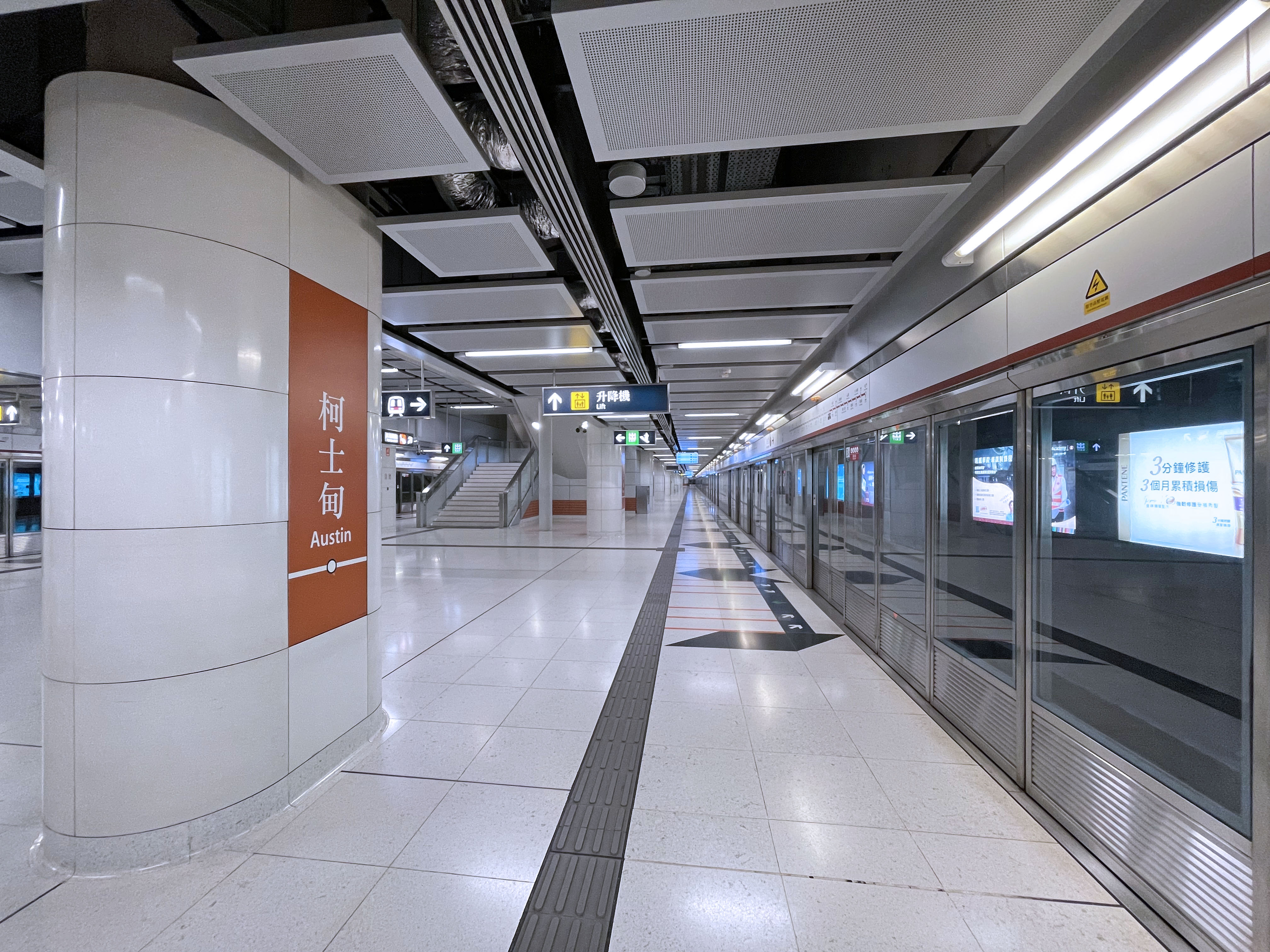
Platform 1 of Austin station in June 2021

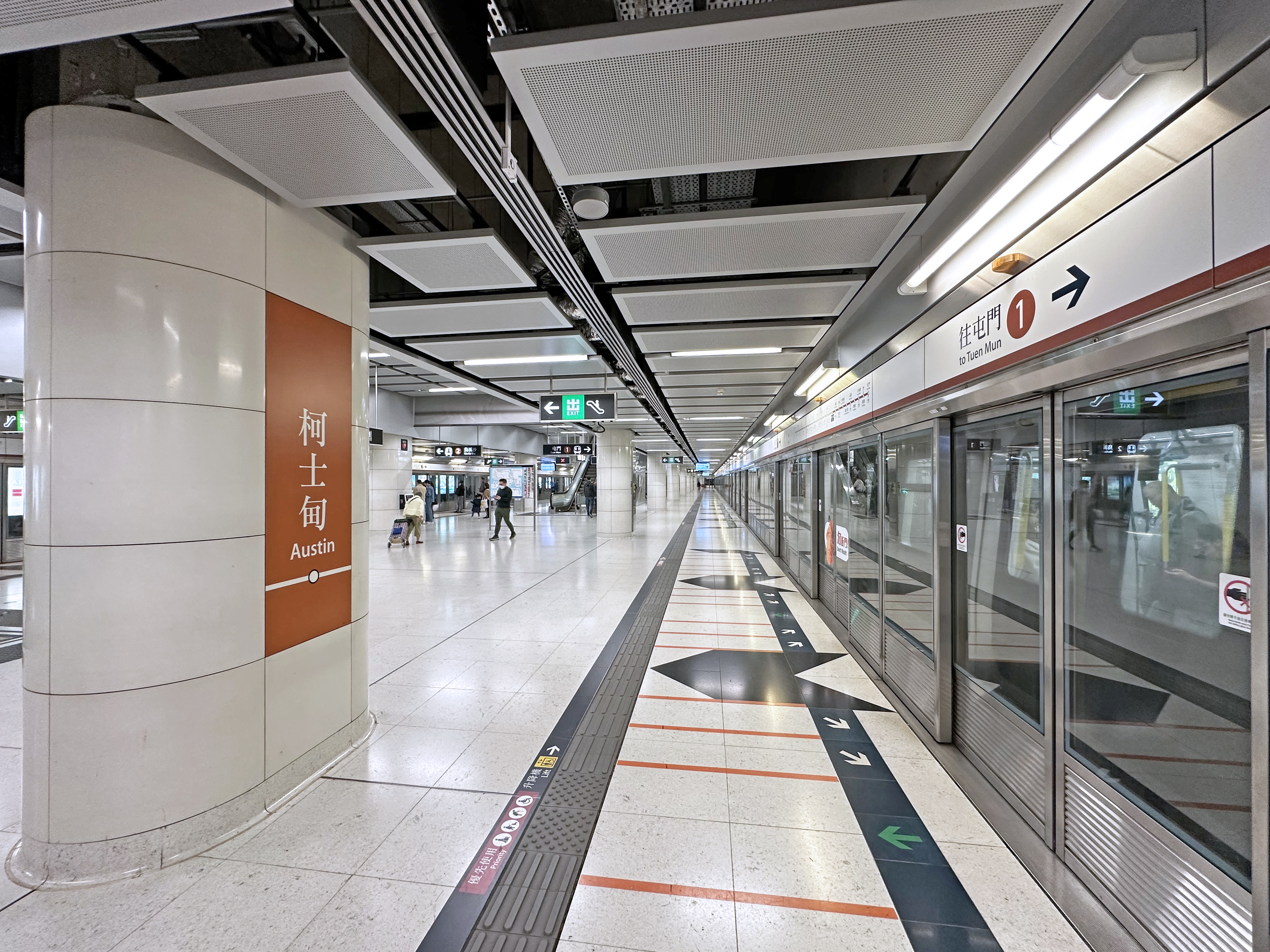
Platform 1 of Austin station in December 2023

The station has two tracks and one island platform. The surface station building is divided into two parts by Wui Cheung Road.

By interchanging between Kowloon and Austin stations, Airport Express passengers using Octopus cards can connect to the MTR urban lines for free, immediately before or after the Airport Express journey. Airport Express passengers can travel around the two stations by walking through Exit B5 of this station or using the complimentary Airport Express shuttle bus service. However, it only provides out-of-system connection to Kowloon station for Tung Chung line passengers with gate charges.

Exits A and F are respectively connected with the pedestrian subways at the Jordan Road and the Austin Road junctions with Canton Road. But unlike cases like the subway at the Ngau Tau Kok station, the other exits of these two subways connected to Austin are not numbered.

== Entrances/exits ==
Northern concourse

- A: Jordan Road
- B1/B2: Wui Cheung Road
- B3: The Austin
- B4: Hong Kong West Kowloon Station, International Gateway Centre (IGC), ONE IGC, Ping An Tower, THREE IGC, UBS Tower
- B5: ELEMENTS, Kowloon Station
- C: Hong Kong West Kowloon Station, ELEMENTS, Kowloon Station

Southern concourse

- D1/D2: Austin Road West and West Kowloon Cultural District
- D3: Grand Austin
- D4: Hong Kong West Kowloon Station
- E: Xiqu Centre, China Hong Kong City, China Ferry Terminal
- F: Austin Road, Canton Road, Kwun Chung Sports Centre, B P International, Kowloon Park, Kowloon Park Sports Centre, Kowloon Park Swimming Pool, Canton Road Govemerent Primary School

== See also ==
- Jordan
- Kowloon
- Hong Kong West Kowloon
