= West District =

West District may refer to:

== China ==
- West District (Zhongshan), in Guangdong
- West District (Panzhihua), in Sichuan

== India ==
- West Delhi
- West Sikkim district

== Taiwan ==
- West District, Chiayi, in Chiayi City
- West District, Taichung, in Taichung City

== See also ==
- Western District (disambiguation)
- Nishi-ku (disambiguation)
- Seo-gu
