= Western District =

Western District may refer to:

== Australia ==
- Australia Felix
- Western District (Victoria), Australia
  - Western District Lakes

== Bulgaria ==
- Western district, Plovdiv

== Canada ==
- Western District, Upper Canada

== Hong Kong ==
- Western District (Hong Kong) or Sai Wan

== Malta ==
- Western District, a district of Malta

== Spain ==
- Western District (General Junta of Asturias constituency)

== United Kingdom ==
- Western District (British Army)

== United States ==
- Western District, American Samoa
- Western District of Kentucky
- Western District of Louisiana
- Western District of Michigan
- Western District of Missouri
- Western District of New York
- Western District of North Carolina
- Western District of Oklahoma
- Western District of Pennsylvania
- Western District of Tennessee
- Western District of Texas
- Western District of Virginia
- Western District of Washington
- Western District, Jackson County, West Virginia
- Western District of Wisconsin
- Western District of Columbia, a proposed district in 19th-century Illinois and Kentucky

== Other uses ==
- Western District of The Wire

== See also ==
- Nishi-ku (disambiguation), western districts (ku) in Japanese cities
- Seo-gu (disambiguation), western districts (gu) in Korean cities
- West District (disambiguation)
