= Park Lane Shopper's Boulevard =

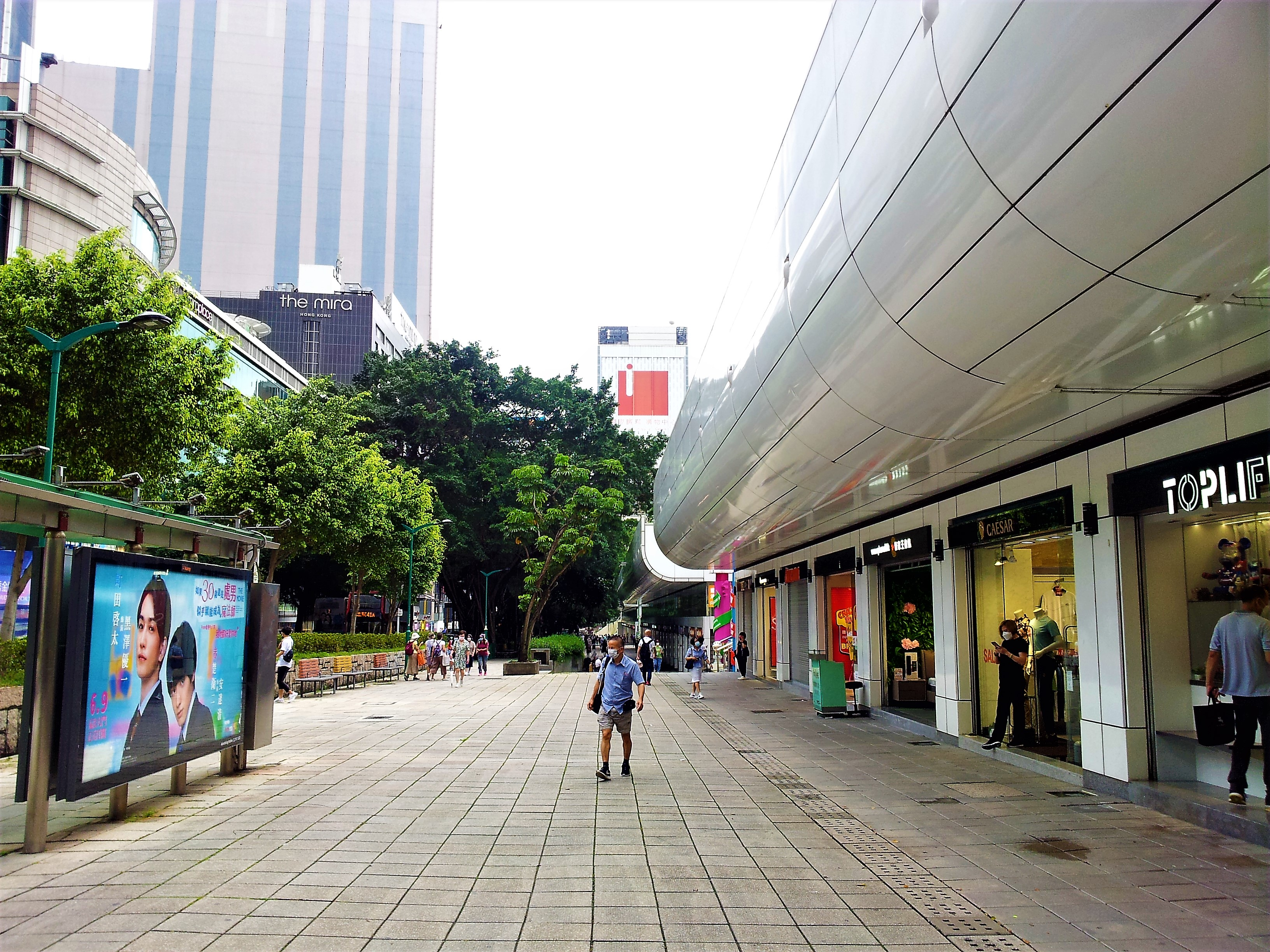
- The boulevard in June 2022
- Location: Tsim Sha Tsui, Kowloon, Hong Kong
- Address: 111-181 Nathan Rd

Park Lane Shopper's Boulevard is a shopping area and visitor attraction along Nathan Road in Tsim Sha Tsui, Kowloon, Hong Kong near Kowloon Park and Tsim Sha Tsui and Jordan stations. It was completed in 1986.
