= Baden-Powell International House =

Hotel and conference centre in Hong Kong

Coordinates: 22.30295°N 114.16943°E

BP International House
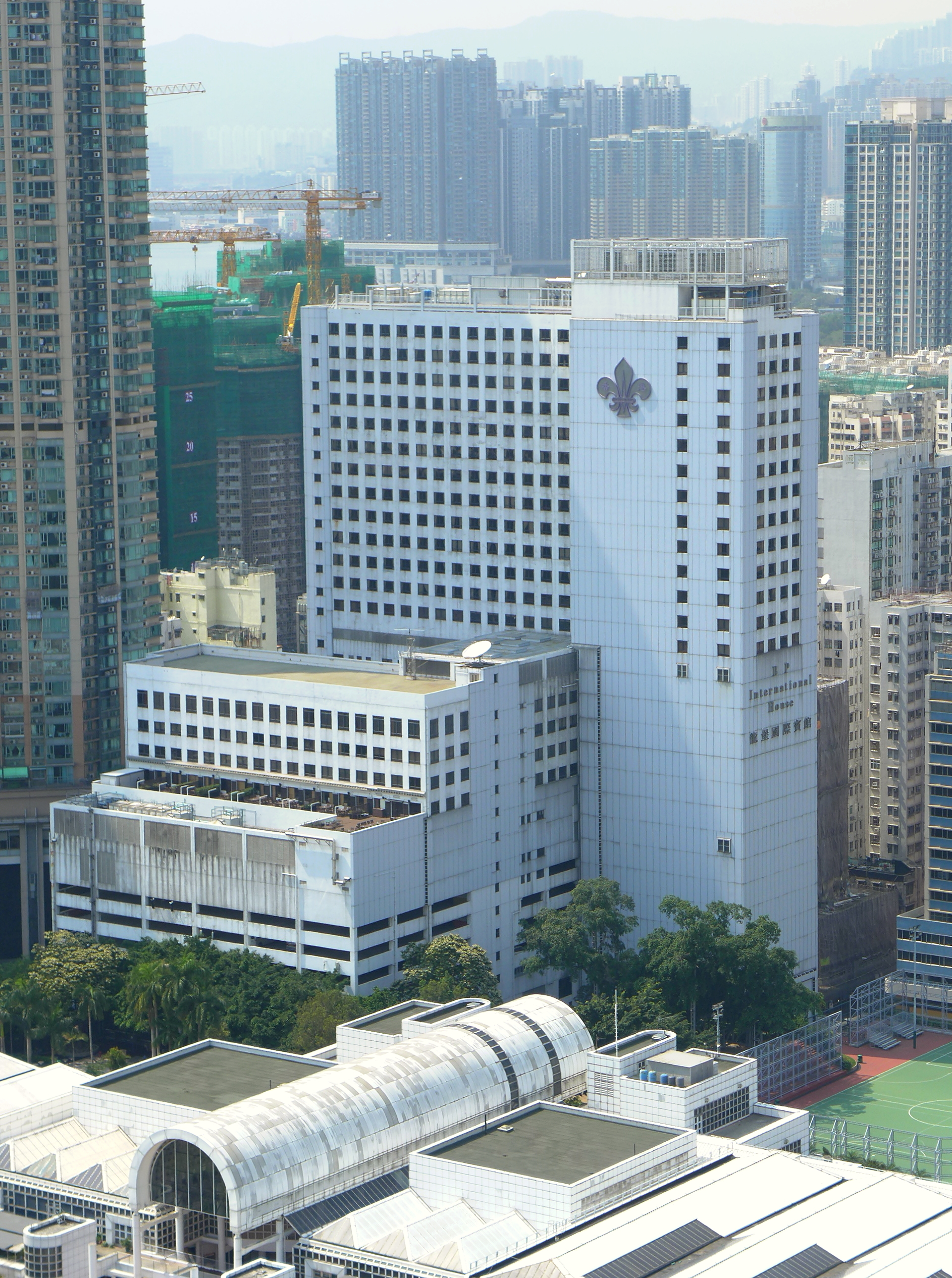

- Location within Hong Kong

General information
- Location: 8 Austin Road, Tsim Sha Tsui, Kowloon, Hong Kong
- Opening: 1993
- Owner: Scout Association of Hong Kong
- Operator: Butterfly Hospitality Group

Technical details
- Floor count: 25

Other information
- Number of rooms: 529
- Number of suites: 7
- Number of restaurants: 2
- Parking: 530

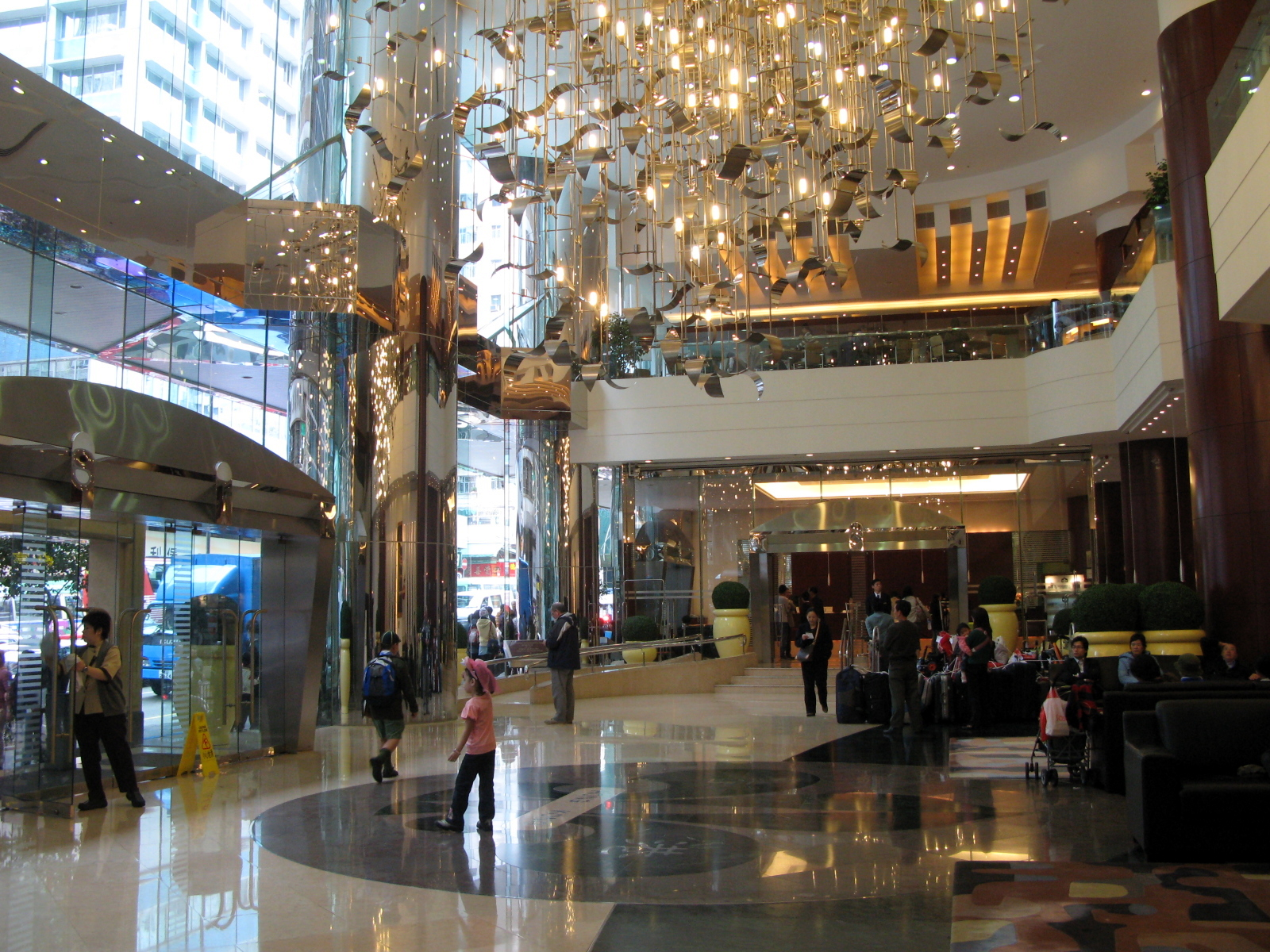
The lobby of BP International

The B P International, more formally known as Baden-Powell International House, is a 25-storey hotel and conference centre in the Tsim Sha Tsui neighbourhood on the Kowloon Peninsula, Hong Kong.

Owned by The Scout Association of Hong Kong, which hold offices there, it shows limited Scouting presence. The formal address is 8 Austin Road. It is operated by the Butterfly Hospitality Group since 2025.

== Hotel ==
B P International has 529 rooms and seven suites, accommodating over one thousand guests. All rooms have quality modern amenities. For conferences and other large groups, the Gordon Wu Hall on the upper ground floor can hold up to 1,000 people in various settings. The first five floors of the building provide a 500+ spaces parking area. The three restaurants are in the basement and on the ground floor.

Although the B P International is connected to the Scout Association of Hong Kong, it is commercially autonomous, and presents a minimal Scout presence in the lobby. Scouts may receive reduced rates at request.

== Scouting ==
The B P International is the major part of the Hong Kong Scout Centre, run by The Scout Association of Hong Kong. The association is housed on the 8th through 11th floors.

For July 2005, the B P International was the proposed host for the 9th World Scout Youth Forum, and the 37th World Scout Conference, which were actually held in Hammamet, Tunisia

== Music ==
The Eraserheads recorded their song "Cutterpillow" for their third studio album of the same name in room #1417 of this hotel.

== See also ==
- Baden-Powell House in London
