= Jordan station =

MTR station in Kowloon, Hong Kong

Jordan 佐敦
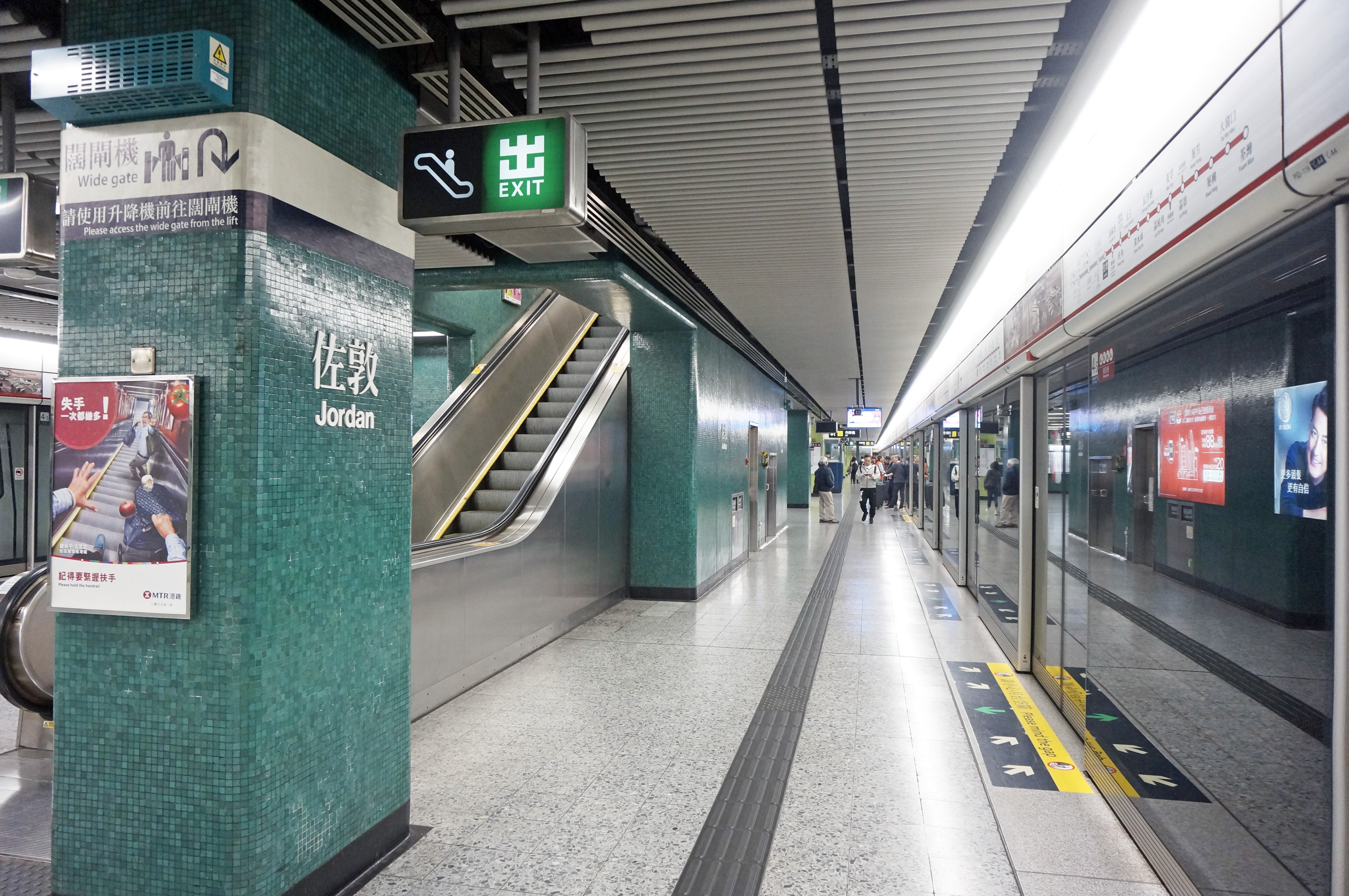
- Platforms in 2019

Chinese name
- Chinese: 佐敦
- Hanyu Pinyin: Zuǒdūn
- Cantonese Yale: Jódēun
- Literal meaning: Jordan
Transcriptions
Standard Mandarin
- Hanyu Pinyin: Zuǒdūn
- Wade–Giles: Tso^{3}-tun^{1}
Yue: Cantonese
- Yale Romanization: Jódēun
- Jyutping: Zo3deon1

General information
- Location: Jordan Road, Jordan; Hong Kong
- Coordinates: 22°18′18″N 114°10′18″E
- System: MTR rapid transit station
- Owner: MTR Corporation
- Operator: MTR Corporation
- Line: Tsuen Wan line
- Platforms: 2 (1 island platform)
- Tracks: 2
- Connections: Bus, minibus

Construction
- Structure type: Underground
- Platform levels: 1
- Accessible: yes

Other information
- Station code: JOR

History
- Opened: 16 December 1979; 46 years ago
- Former names: Kwun Chung

Services
Preceding station	MTR	Following station
Tsim Sha Tsui towards Central	Tsuen Wan line	Yau Ma Tei towards Tsuen Wan
Track layout
Location
- Location within MTR Location within Hong Kong urban core

Jordan is an MTR station on the Tsuen Wan line. It has dark green and light green livery. It is named after Jordan Road.

== Location ==
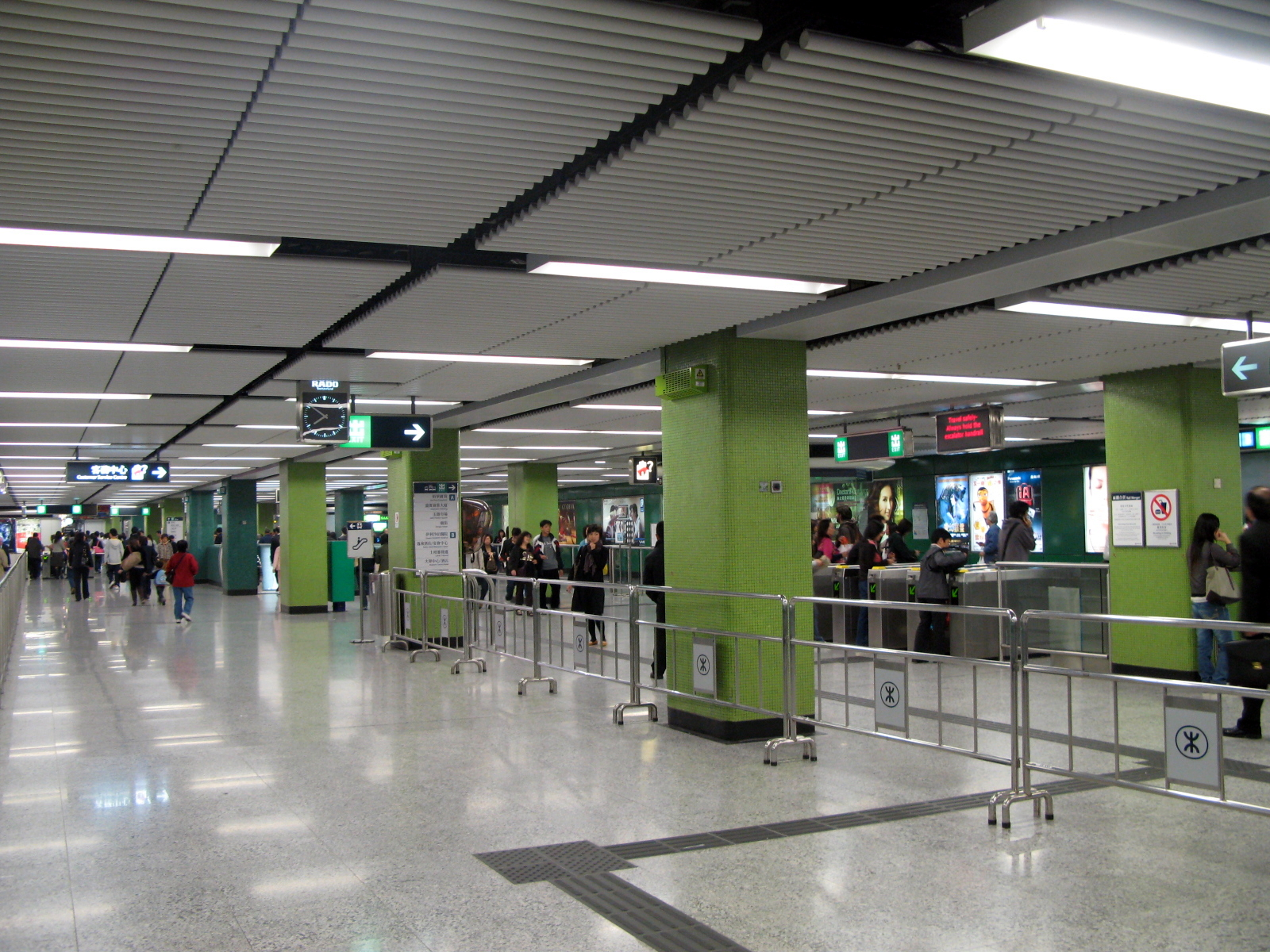
Jordan station Concourse

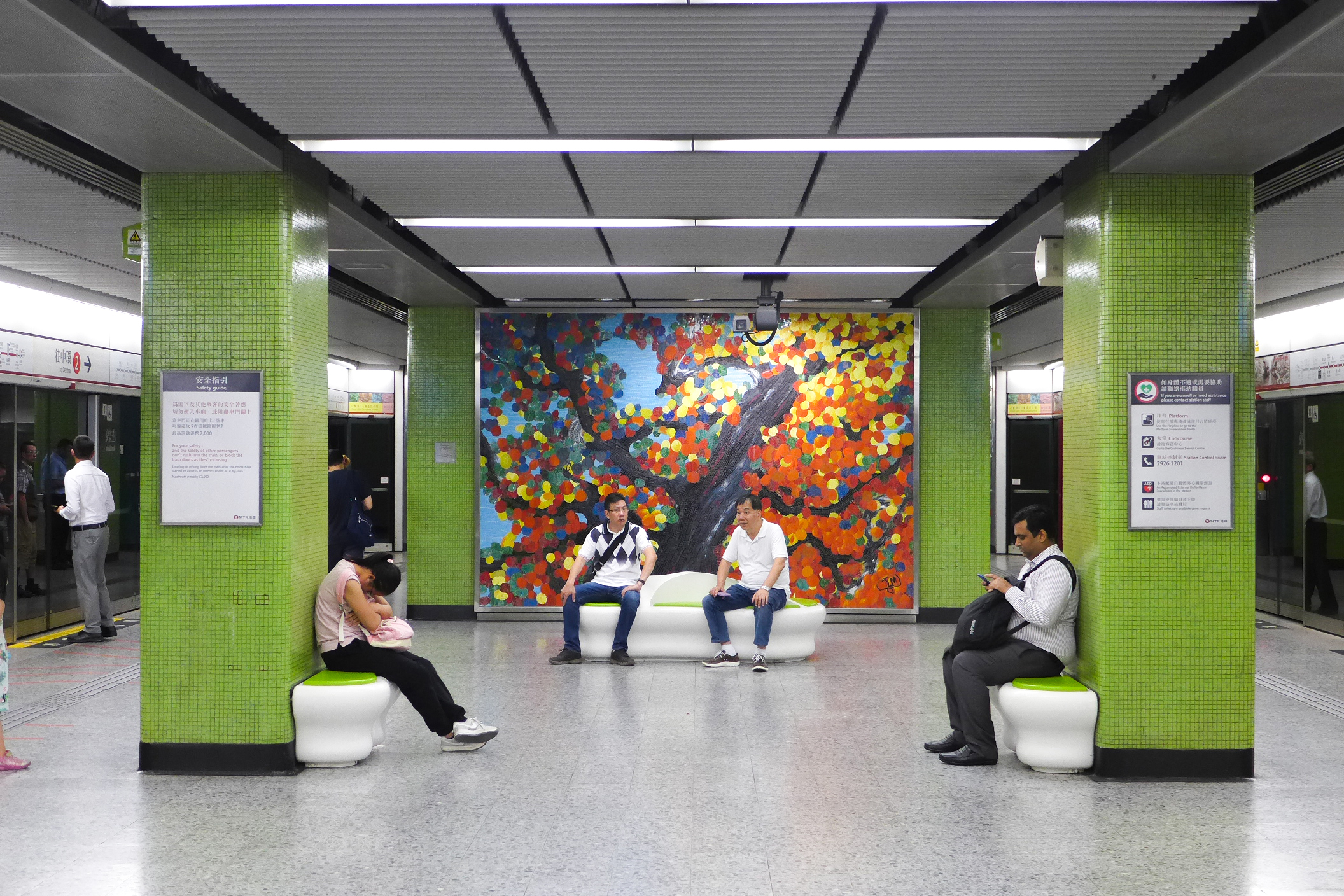
Jordan station Artwork "PERSIMMON"

Jordan station is located in Jordan at the intersection of two main thoroughfares: Nathan Road and Jordan Road, the station eponymously named after the latter. The northern portion of Kowloon Park is only a few blocks south of the station and King's Park is about 250m northeast using Jordan Road. A number of important hotels, buildings, and shopping centres are within walking distance of the station. These include the Novotel Nathan Road Kowloon Hong Kong, Baden-Powell International House, Eaton Hotel Hong Kong, and the Antiquities and Monuments Office.

== History ==
Contract 102 was awarded to Nishimastu Construction for the station's construction. Jordan station opened on 16 December 1979 as part of the second phase of the Kwun Tong line that extended the Kwun Tong line from Shek Kip Mei to Tsim Sha Tsui. When the Tsuen Wan line opened on 17 May 1982, the Kwun Tong line was shortened and terminated at Yau Ma Tei, the first stop north of Jordan, and Jordan was transferred to the Tsuen Wan line. In 2000, along with five other stations on the Tsuen Wan line, Jordan became one of the first stations in the MTR network to be retrofitted with platform screen doors which aid in ventilation, crowd control and passenger safety.

== Station layout ==
Jordan is laid out similarly to many MTR stations. Passengers enter on the ground level and take escalators down to the concourse, and then one more level down to the centre island with two platforms.

-3	Ground level	Exits
-4	Concourse	Customer Service, MTRShops, Hang Seng Bank, vending machine, ATMs; Octopus promotion machine
-5; Platforms	Platform 1	Tsuen Wan line towards Tsuen Wan (Yau Ma Tei)
-5; Platforms	Island platform, doors will open on the right
-5; Platforms	Platform 2	Tsuen Wan line towards Central (Tsim Sha Tsui)

== Entrances/exits ==
- A: Yue Hwa Chinese Products Emporium
  (Yue Hwa Emporium)
- B: Queen Elizabeth Hospital
  - B1: Novotel Nathan Road Kowloon Hong Kong, Chung Hing Hotel, Eaton Hotel
  - B2: Diocesan Girls' School, Queen Elizabeth Hospital
- C: Bowring Street
  - C1: Austin Road, Chuang's London Plaza, JD Mail, Kowloon Park, Kowloon Park Sports Centre, Kowloon Park Swimming Pool, Tsim Sha Tsui Polise Station, Park Lane Shopper's Boulevard
  - C2: Bowring Street, BP International, Kwun Chung Municipal Services Building, Xiqu Centre, Austin Station, High Speed Rail
- D: Austin Road, St. Andrew's Church, Antiquities and Monuments Office, Hong Kong Observatory, Hong Kong Coliseum, Hong Kong Museum of History, Hong Kong Science Museum
- E: Prudential Centre / Pruton Prudential Hotel

== See also ==
- Jordan, Hong Kong
