= Novotel Nathan Road Kowloon Hong Kong =

Hotel in Kowloon, Hong Kong

- 香港九龍諾富特酒店

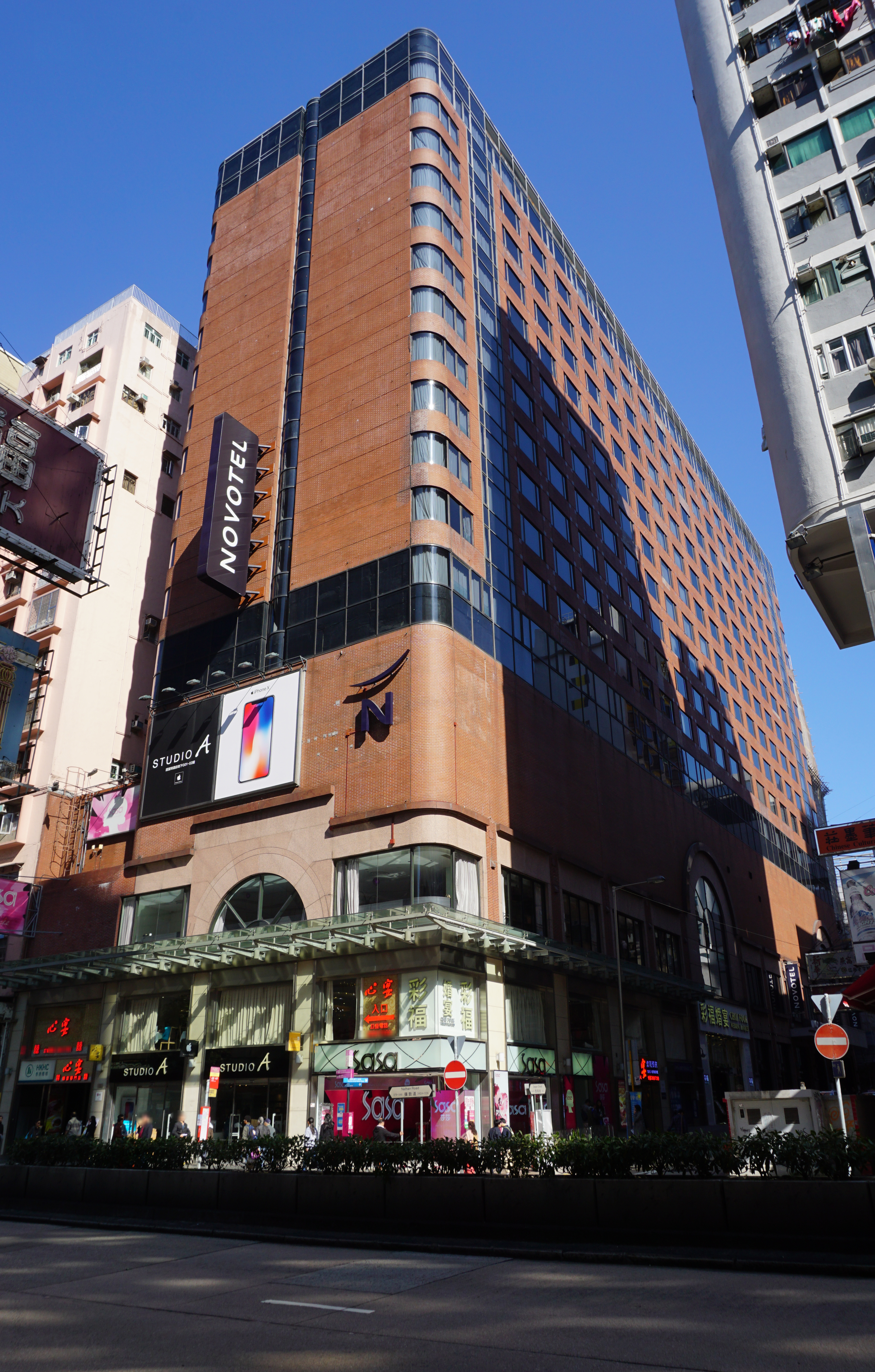
- Hotel facade along Nathan Road. Jordan (Hong Kong)
- Interactive map of the Novotel Nathan Road Kowloon Hong Kong area
- Former names: Majestic Hotel

General information
- Location: 348 Nathan Road, Kowloon; Hong Kong
- Coordinates: 22°18′26.06″N 114°10′19.40″E
- Opening: April 2008; 17 years ago
- Owner: Gaw Capital and CSI Properties

Technical details
- Floor count: 15

Design and construction
- Architecture firm: Wong & Ouyang (HK) Ltd.

Renovating team
- Architect: Naço Architectures

Other information
- Number of rooms: 389
- Number of suites: 3
- Number of restaurants: 2

Website
- http://novotel-hongkong-nathanroad.com

Novotel Hong Kong Nathan Road Kowloon (Chinese: 香港九龍諾富特酒店) is a 4-star hotel in Kowloon, Hong Kong. Formerly known as the Majestic Hotel, the hotel reopened in April 2008, following a HK$188 million (approx US$24 million) refurbishment programme, upgraded to 4-star and rebranded as a Novotel. The hotel is managed by the hotel group Accor. The hotel closed due to the COVID-19 pandemic and was demolished from September 2021.

== Location ==
The hotel is located at 348 Nathan Road, at the corner of Saigon Street, in Kowloon, Hong Kong, between Jordan and Yau Ma Tei, near Temple Street Night Market and the Jade Market. The nearest MTR station is Jordan station.

== History ==
The site was formerly occupied by the Majestic Theatre (大華戲院), a cinema opened in December 1928 and closed in December 1988. The M2 Theatre opened next to the Majestic Theatre in 1978 and also closed in December 1988. Both cinemas were then demolished and the Majestic Hotel was built on the site, with the Majestic Centre, an integrated shopping arcade in the lower floors, and a cinema, the Majestic Cinema occupying the second floor of the building. The Majestic Cinema had two small auditoriums with 401 and 432 seats respectively, and a cinema lobby at the ground floor. It opened in 1992 and closed in 2000.

The cinema was then converted into the 348 Discothèque and Karaoke bar, operated by an alleged 14K triad gang leader, Teddy Hung Hon-yee (洪漢義). One of Hong Kong's largest discos, it closed down in 2007 following a series of police crackdowns, after having been renamed "F1" for a while. Hung ran gambling rooms, opium dens and bars in To Kwa Wan and served 14 years in prison from 1984 to 1998. In 2009, he announced that he had converted to Christianity and repented to a priest.

The Majestic Hotel was a 3-star hotel built in 1992. It had 381 rooms and suites, a business centre, two function rooms, a restaurant and a bar, the Cafe Royal and the Ming Sing Bar, both on the first floor.

In May 2007, a fund managed by LaSalle Investment Management acquired the Majestic Hotel and the Majestic Centre shopping arcade for HK$1.69 billion. The site then underwent a HK$188 million (approx US$24 million) refurbishment programme and was upgraded to a 4-star hotel. It reopened in April 2008, having been rebranded into a Novotel, managed by Accor. The shopping arcade was renamed "Nathan Square".

In 2012, LaSalle Investment Management sold the hotel to investment fund Gaw Capital Partners and the property investment company CSI Properties for about HK$2.37 billion. This deal was the biggest hotel transaction in 11 years in Hong Kong.

== The hotel ==
The 15-storey Novotel Nathan Road Kowloon Hong Kong offers 389 guest rooms and suites. Executive Premier Lounge, In Balance Fitness Centre, Web Corner on iMac, children's play area, beauty and hot stone massage centre within the hotel, tour desk, a bar and an all day dining restaurant, including the Tasca Bar and The SQUARE restaurant. Between 2008 and 2012, the hotel's occupancy rate was over 95%.

== Photo gallery ==
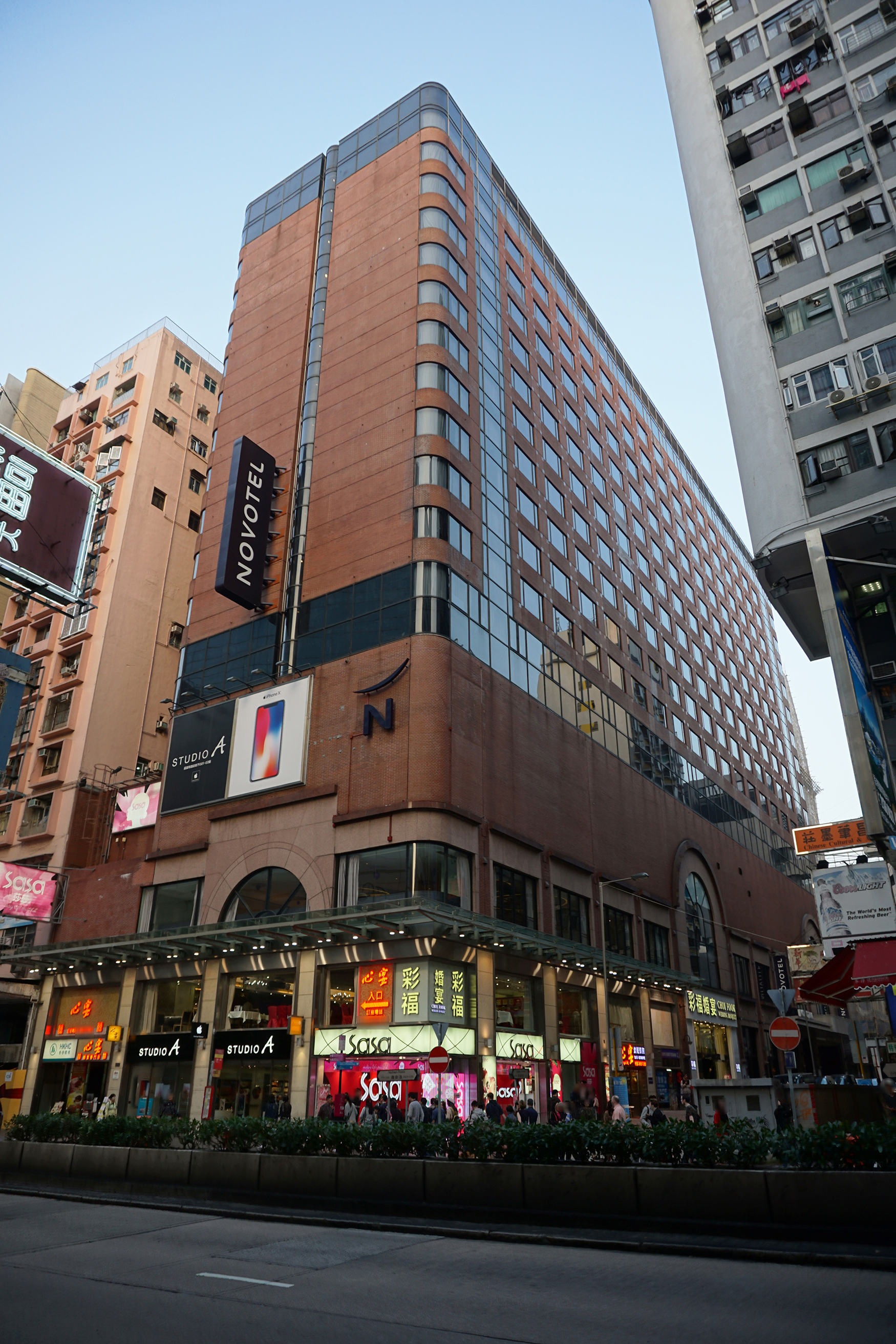
Hotel facade along Nathan Road

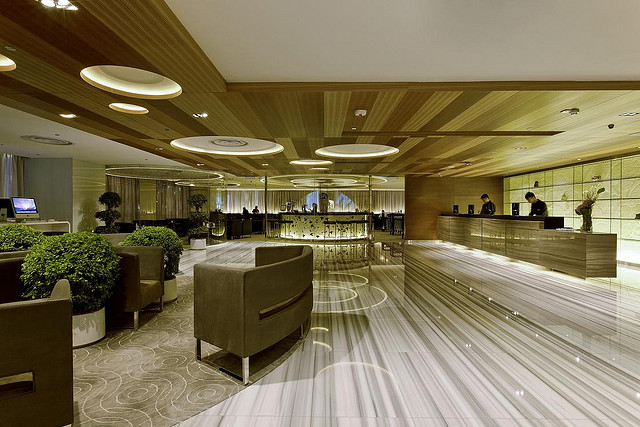
Hotel Lobby

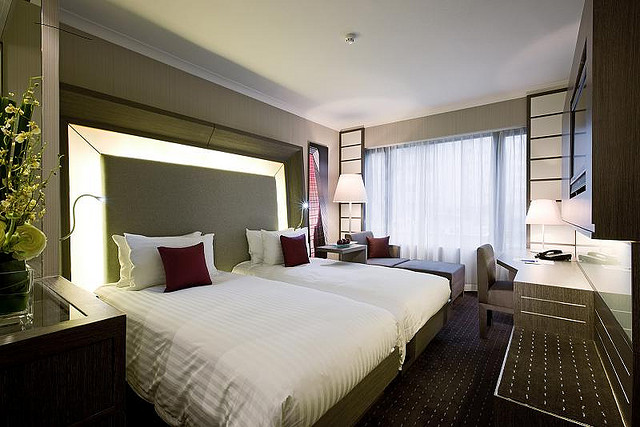
Superior Twin Room

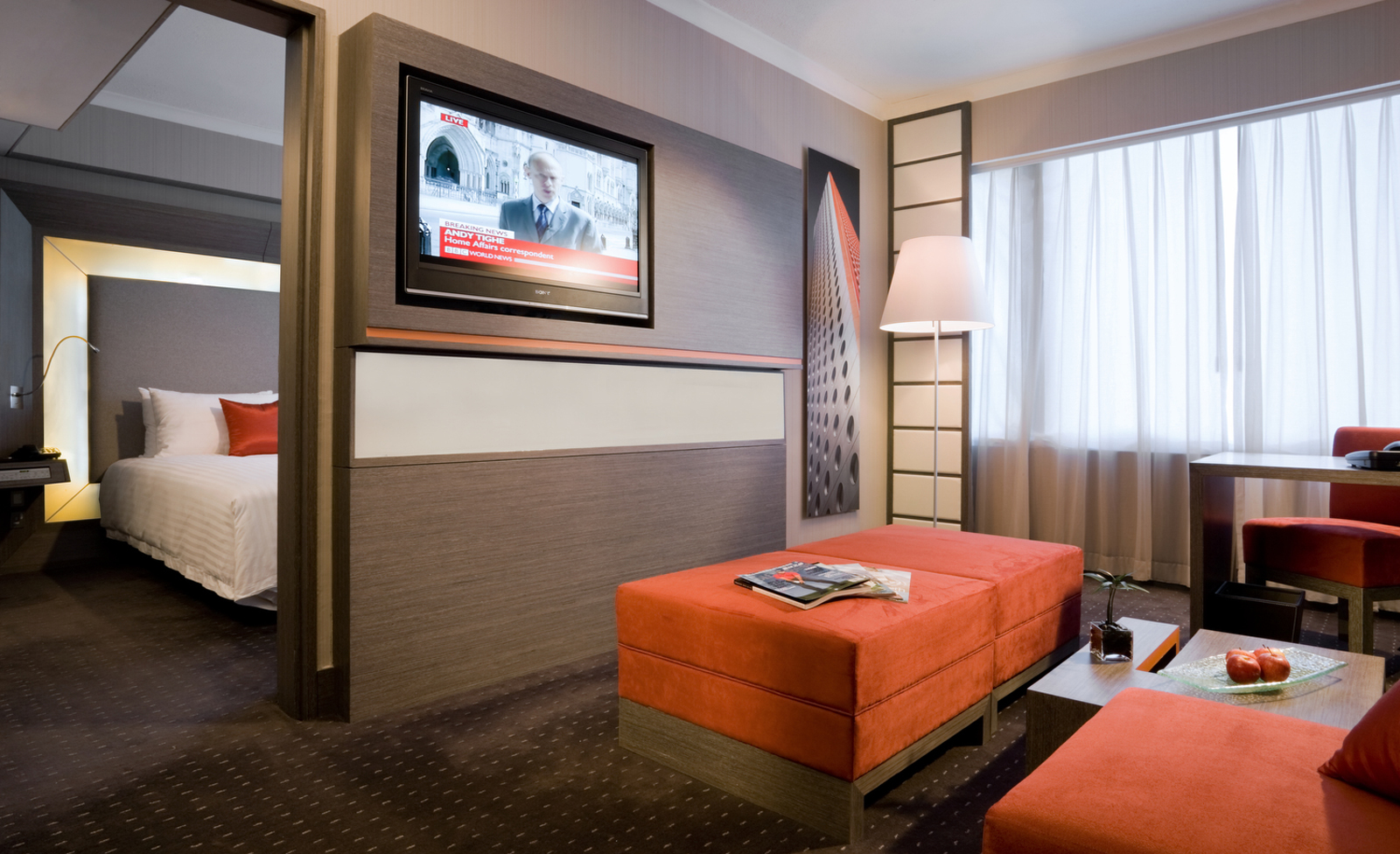
Executive Premier Suite

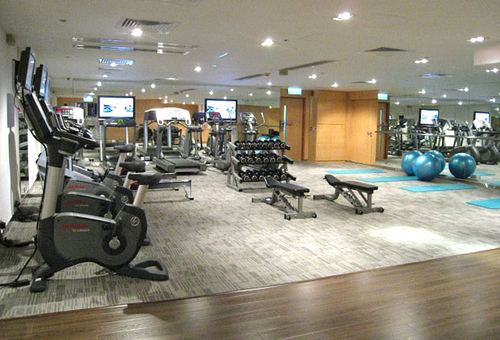
In Balance Fitness
