= Jordan, Hong Kong =

Jordan 佐敦
- Suburb
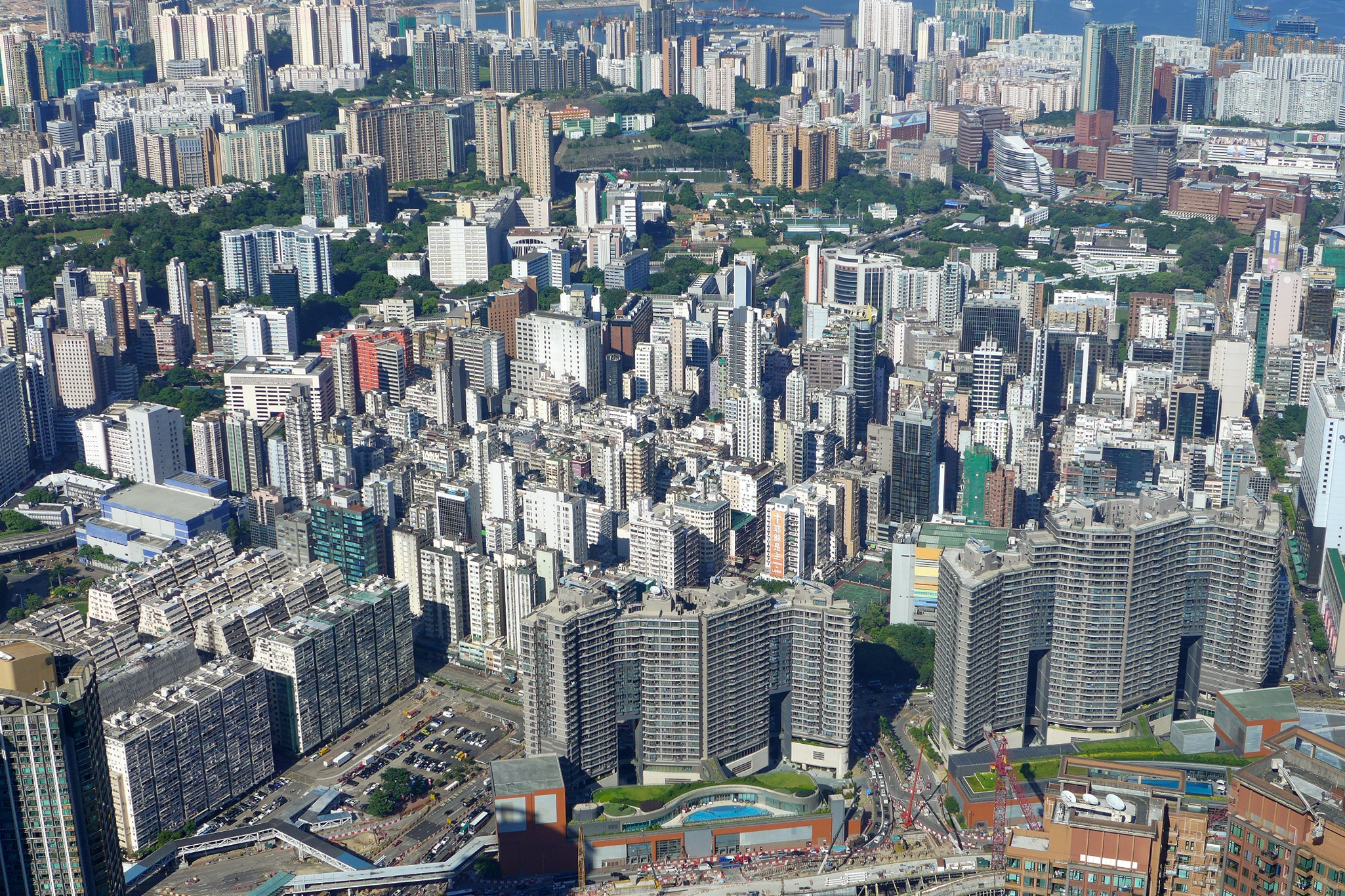
- Aerial view of Jordan, with Austin Station in the lower part of the picture. The colorful building is Kwun Chung Municipal Services Building.
- Interactive map of Jordan
- District: Yau Tsim Mong District
- Statutorily-defined area: Kowloon
- Country: Hong Kong

Population (2011)
  - Total: 41,248

Jordan, Hong Kong
- Chinese: 佐敦
Transcriptions
Standard Mandarin
- Hanyu Pinyin: Zuǒdūn
Hakka
- Romanization: Zo^{4} dun^{1}
Yue: Cantonese
- Yale Romanization: Jo dēun
- Jyutping: Zo2 deon1

Jordan (Chinese: 佐敦) is an area in Hong Kong, located on Kowloon Peninsula. It is named after a road of the same name in the district. The area is bordered by King's Park to the east, Tsim Sha Tsui to the south, Ferry Point to the west, and Yau Ma Tei to the north. Administratively, it is part of Yau Tsim Mong District.

== Geography ==
Jordan is located in the central part of the Yau Tsim Mong District. The western portion is officially known as Kwun Chung (官涌), especially before the MTR metro system went into service in 1979.

Jordan is considered as an area surrounded by Cox's Road to the east, Austin Road to the south, Ferry Street to the west, and Kansu Street to the north. This would make Jordan approximately 1-square-kilometre (0.39 sq mi) in size with a population of about 150,000.

Like most of southern Kowloon, Jordan is entirely developed and urbanised other than a few small parks. Motor and pedestrian traffic throughout most of the day is very dense.

== Character ==
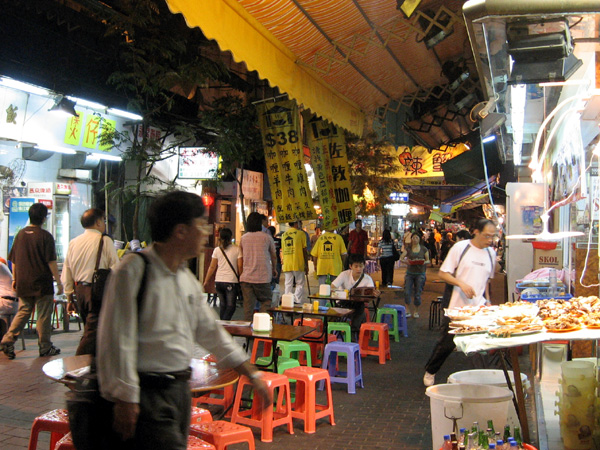
A food stand near the corner of Woosung St. and Nanking St., Jordan, Hong Kong

Jordan is a microcosm of working-class Hong Kong. Like nearby districts of Mong Kok and Tsim Sha Tsui, large sections of Jordan hosts a mix of older residential high-rises, office buildings, street markets, hotels, eateries and an almost infinite variety of small shops. There are also sections offering karaoke, hostess bars and massage parlours; nearby Mong Kok is better known for such services, however.

Although Jordan lacks the sights and comforts to support mass mainstream tourism, it still attracts a small cadre of adventurous tourists interested in experiencing authentic working-class life in Hong Kong. For locals, many live in Jordan for its relatively affordable housing, its centralised location on the spine of Hong Kong's transportation network and its diverse cultural flavour.

Jordan is home to a large number of Indians, Pakistanis, Nepalese and other ethnic minorities. The area bordering Ferry Point therefore hosts a wide array of South Asian and other restaurants and market stores.

== Tourism and recreation ==
The following noteworthy places are located in Jordan:

- Australia Dairy Company
- Diocesan Girls' School
- Gun Club Hill Barracks
- Jade Market & Jade Street
- Kowloon Union Church
- Man Wah Sun Chuen
- Temple Street Night Market
- King George V Memorial Park, Kowloon
- Kowloon Cricket Club
- Kowloon Park (North Entrance)

Jordan is also home to a number of prominent hotels in Kowloon:

- Novotel Nathan Road Kowloon Hong Kong
- Eaton Hotel Hong Kong
- Nathan Hotel
- Mayfair Garden Hotel

== Major roads and streets ==
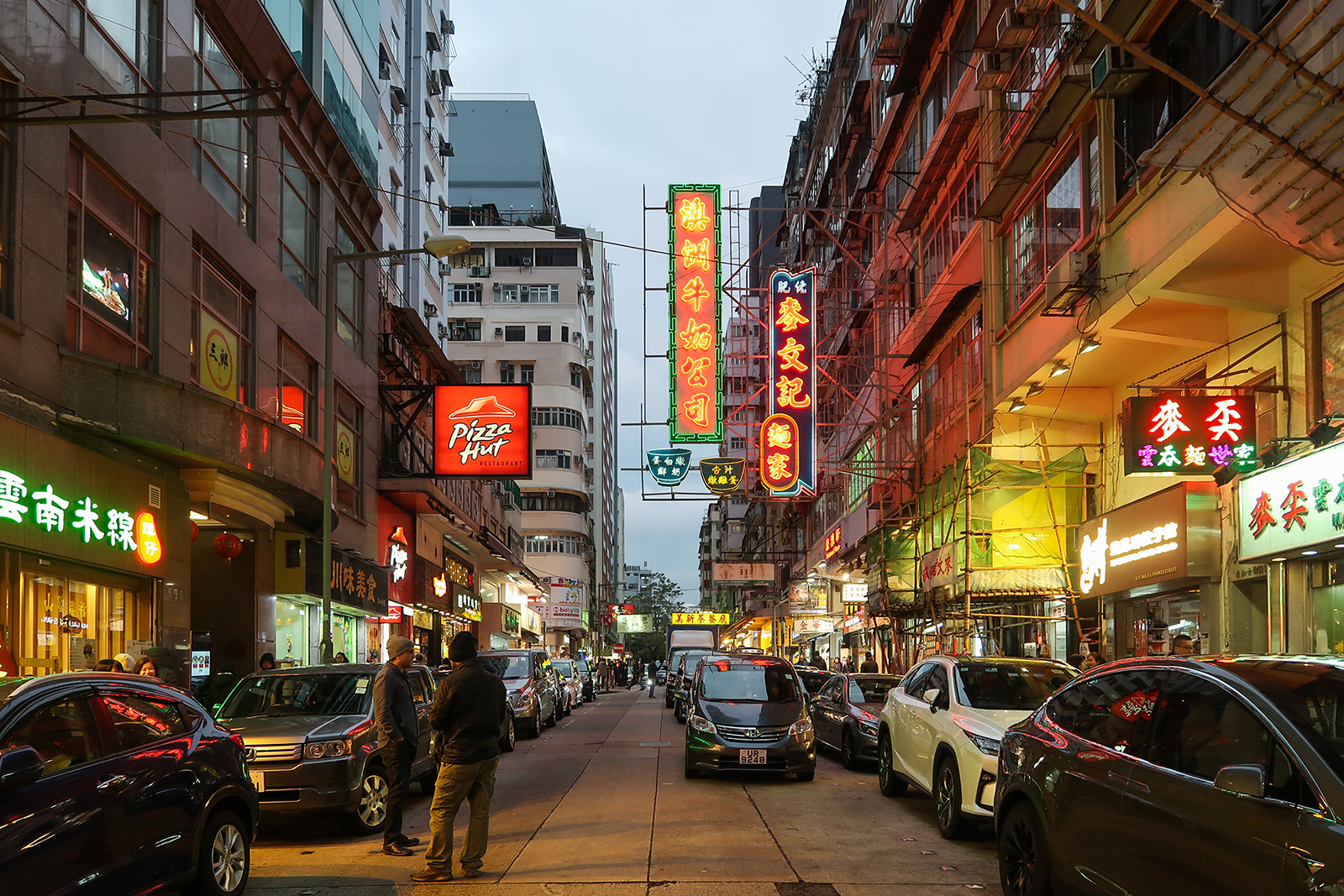
Parkes Street

- Austin Road
- Battery Street
- Bowring Street
- Gascoigne Road
- Cox's Road
- Jordan Path
- Jordan Road
- Kansu Street
- Kwun Chung Street
- Min Street
- Nanking Street
- Ning Po Street
- Pak Hoi Street
- Parkes Street (白加士街), named after Harry Parkes
- Pilkem Street
- Reclamation Street
- Saigon Street
- Temple Street
- Woosung Street

== Transport ==
Nathan Road and Jordan Road run through the area. The intersection of these two roads is a major intersection in Kowloon.

Jordan is served by the MTR station of the same name, on the Tsuen Wan line, as well as numerous bus lines.

Jordan is also the site of a bus terminal for transport to the Huanggang Border Crossing in Shenzhen, China.

== See also ==
- List of places in Hong Kong
- Austin MTR station
- Jordan MTR station
- King's Park
- Tsim Sha Tsui
- Yau Ma Tei
