= 西湖 =

西湖 (literally "west lake") may refer to:

- Saiko (Yamanashi), one of the Fuji Five Lakes, located in Yamanashi Prefecture, Japan
- West Lake or Xī Hú, a fresh water lake located in central Hangzhou, Zhejiang province, China

== See also ==
- West Lake (disambiguation)
