= Xiqu, Gansu =

Xiqu 西渠镇
- Town
- Location in Gansu
- Coordinates: 38°58′50″N 103°32′29″E
- Country: People's Republic of China
- Province: Gansu
- Prefecture-level city: Wuwei
- County: Minqin County
- Time zone: UTC+8 (China Standard)

Xiqu (Chinese: 西渠; pinyin: Xīqú) is a town in Minqin County, Gansu province, China. As of 2020, it had 2 residential communities and 33 villages under its administration.

Communities

- Xiqu Town Community
- Haoshun Community (号顺社区)

Villages

- Shizhen Village (食珍村)
- Shicheng Village (始成村)
- Minzheng Village (民政村)
- Xingfu Village (幸福村)
- Minqi Village (民旗村)
- Fengzheng Village (丰政村)
- Jianli Village (建立村)
- Aiheng Village (爱恒村)
- Shangzuo Village (尚坐村)
- Shouhao Village (首好村)
- Beigou Village (北沟村)
- Zhichan Village (制产村)
- Fugong Village (扶拱村)
- Zhixiang Village (致祥村)
- Daba Village (大坝村)
- Banhu Village (板湖村)
- Sanyuan Village (三元村)
- Sanfu Village (三附村)
- Wanshun Village (万顺村)
- Dongsheng Village (东胜村)
- Shuisheng Village (水盛村)
- Dongrong Village (东容村)
- Waixi Village (外西村)
- Juyuan Village (巨元村)
- Huokan Village (火坎村)
- Xijin Village (西金村)
- Yucheng Village (玉成村)
- Zhuming Village (珠明村)
- Ziyun Village (字云村)
- Jianggui Village (姜桂村)
- Jieyu Village (芥玉村)
- Chuxian Village (出鲜村)
- Haoshun Village (号顺村)
