= Western district, Plovdiv =

District of Plovdiv, Bulgaria

Coordinates: 42°7′55″N 24°42′45″E

Western district (Bulgarian: Район Западен) is a district of Plovdiv, southern Bulgaria. The district includes the quarters Proslav, Hristo Smirnenski, Mladeshki Halm and Mladost, and has 39,158 inhabitants. The largest sports complex in Eastern Europe is located in a pleasant park on the southern banks of the Maritsa river. It includes Bulgaria's largest stadium "Plovdiv", rowing base, football terrains, tennis courts, pools as well as cafés, restaurants and places for rest.
