= Seo District =

- Hangul: 서구
- Hanja: 西區
- RR: Seo-gu
- MR: Sŏ-gu

Seo District (Korean: 서구), or "Western District", is the name of a gu in several South Korean cities:

- Seo District, Busan
- Seo District, Daegu
- Seo District, Daejeon
- Seo District, Gwangju
- Seo District, Incheon
