= Nishi-ku =

Nishi-ku (西区) is a common ward name in many Japanese cities.

- Nishi-ku, Fukuoka, in Fukuoka, Fukuoka Prefecture
- Nishi-ku, Hamamatsu, in Hamamatsu, Shizuoka Prefecture
- Nishi-ku, Hiroshima, in Hiroshima, Hiroshima Prefecture
- Nishi-ku, Kōbe, in Kobe, Hyōgo Prefecture
- Nishi-ku, Kumamoto, in Kumamoto, Kumamoto Prefecture
- Nishi-ku, Nagoya, in Nagoya, Aichi Prefecture
- Nishi-ku, Niigata, in Niigata, Niigata Prefecture
- Nishi-ku, Ōsaka, in Osaka, Osaka Prefecture
- Nishi-ku, Saitama, in Saitama, Saitama Prefecture
- Nishi-ku, Sakai, in Sakai, Osaka Prefecture
- Nishi-ku, Sapporo, in Sapporo, Hokkaido Prefecture
- Nishi-ku, Yokohama, in Yokohama, Kanagawa Prefecture

== See also ==
- Western District (disambiguation)
