= Xiqu Centre =

Performing art studio in Hong Kong

- 戲曲中心
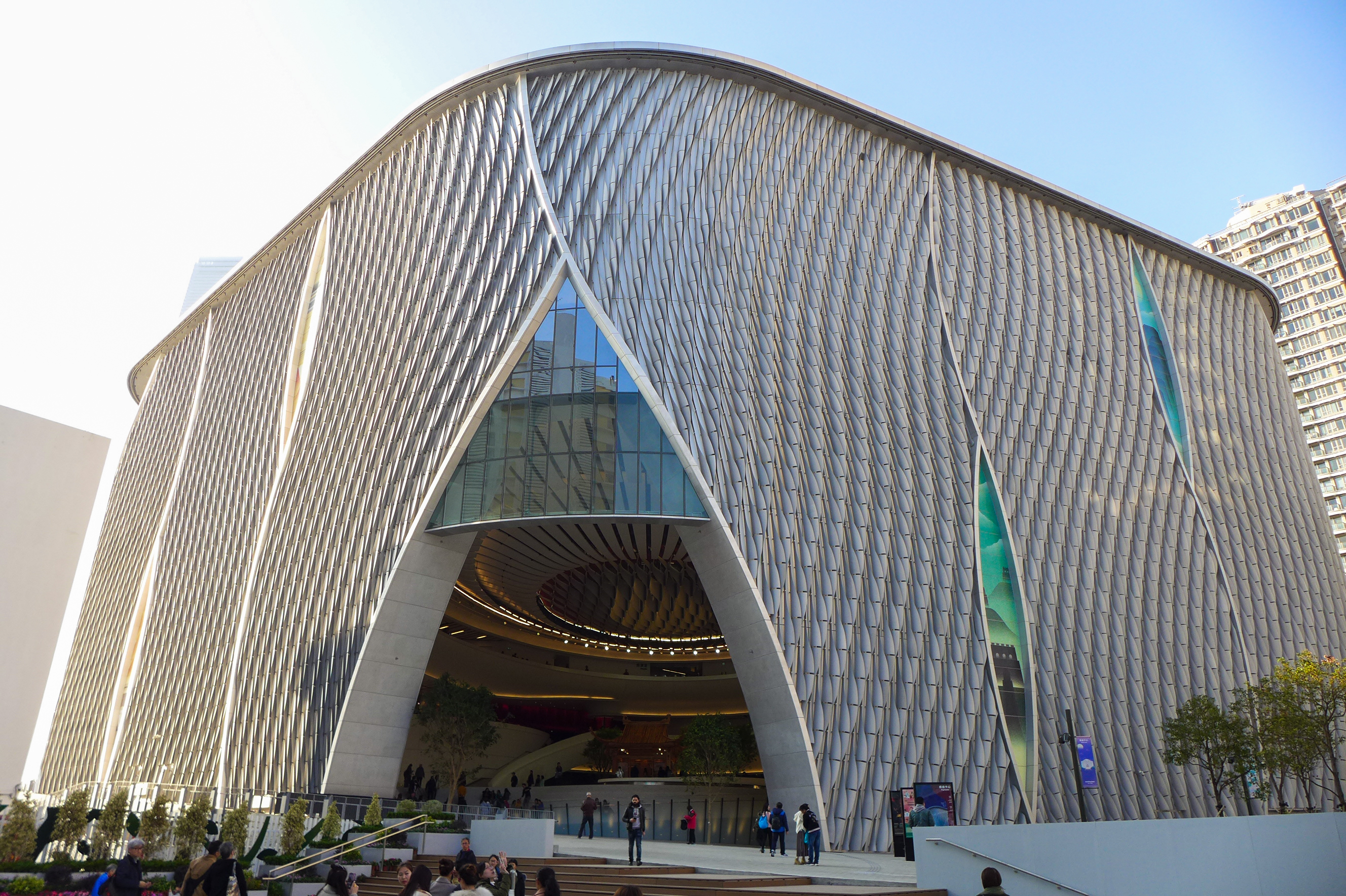
- Xiqu Centre seen in December 2018
- Interactive map of Xiqu Centre
- Location: Junction between West Kowloon Cultural District, Canton Road and Austin Road, Tsim Sha Tsui, Kowloon
- Owner: West Kowloon Cultural District Authority
- Capacity: 1,100
- Type: Performing art theater

Construction
- Built: End of 2018
- Opened: January 20, 2019; 7 years ago
- Architect: Revery Architecture, Ronald Lu and Partners
- Project manager: Atkins
- Structural engineer: Buro Happold
- Main contractors: Hip Hing Construction

Website
- Official website

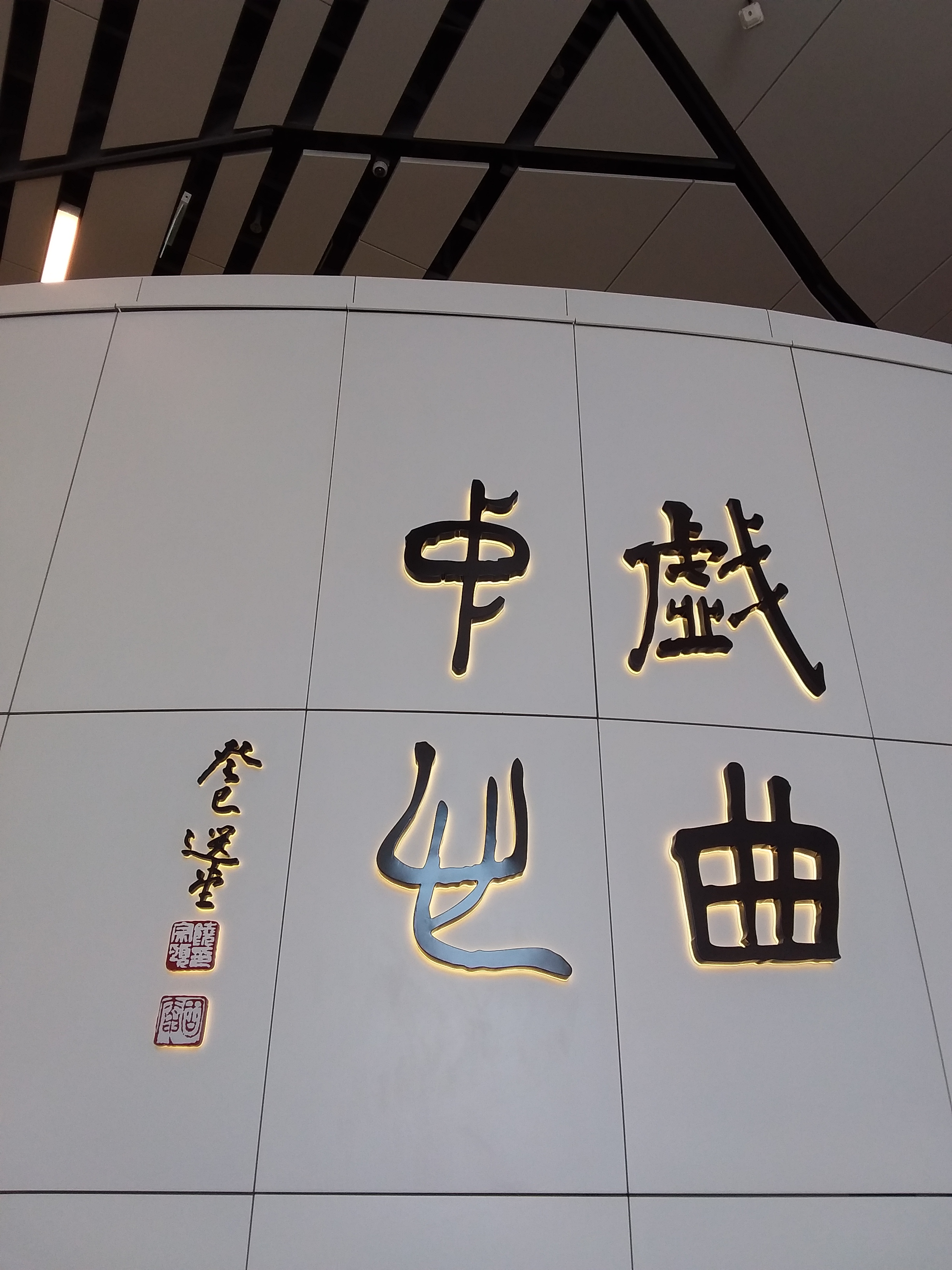
Xiqu Centre name inscribed by Jao Tsung-I

Xiqu Centre is a performing art studio in Hong Kong. Located in Tsim Sha Tsui, the venue is part of the West Kowloon Cultural District and the first building completed in the district plan. The construction began on 24 September 2013, and completed in 2018, costing 2.7 billion HK dollars. The Centre opened to the public on 20 January 2019.

== See also ==
- West Kowloon Bamboo Theatre
- Lee Theatre
