= Austin Road =

Road in Tsim Sha Tsui, Hong Kong

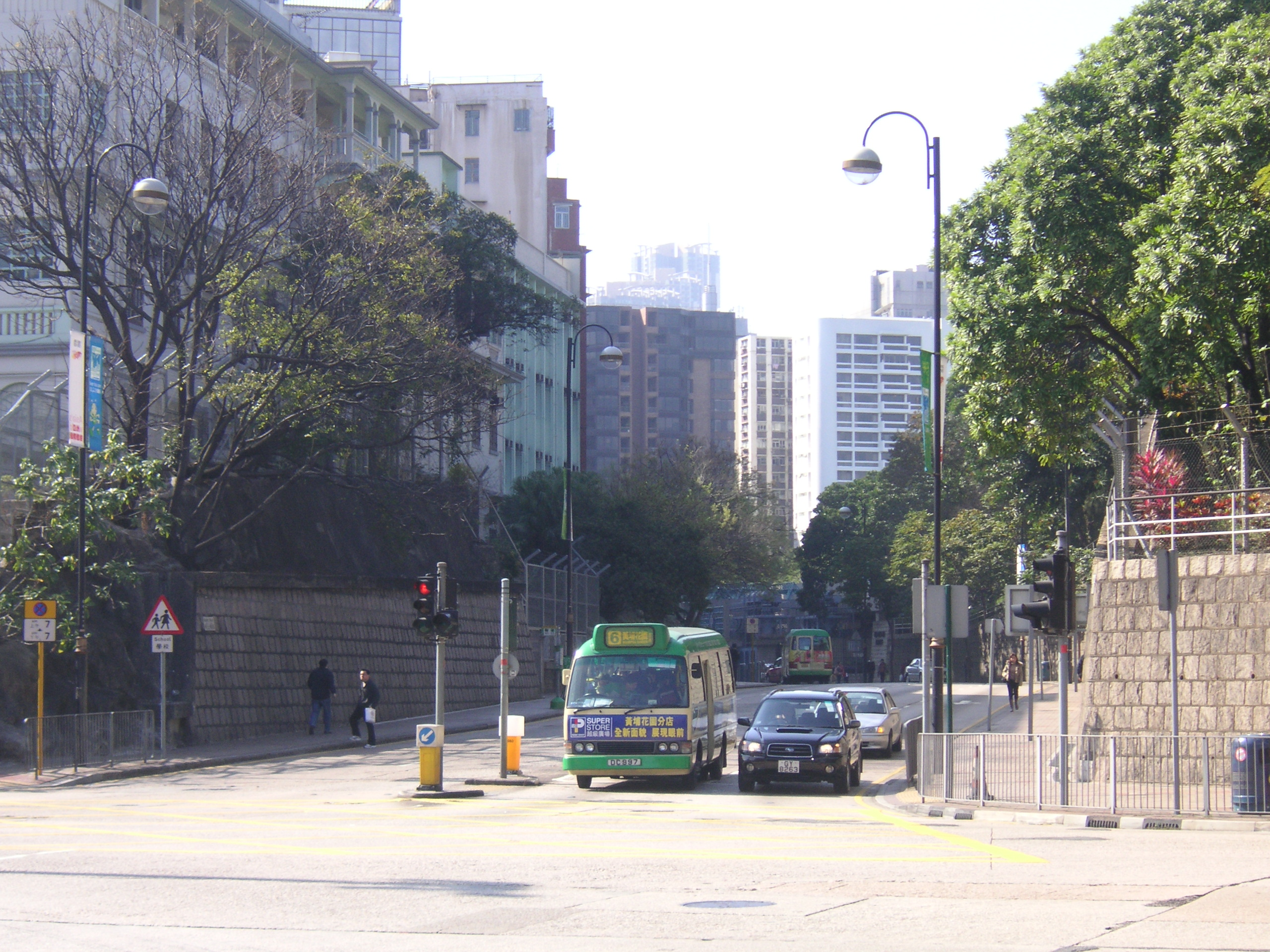
- Austin Road at the junction with Chatham Road
- Interactive map of Austin Road
- Native name: 柯士甸道 (Yue Chinese)
- Namesake: John Gardiner Austin
- Location: Kowloon, Hong Kong
- Coordinates: 22°18′12″N 114°10′22″E
- West end: Canton Road
- East end: Chatham Road

Austin Road (Chinese: 柯士甸道; Jyutping: o1 si6 din6 dou6) is a road in-between Tsim Sha Tsui and Jordan, Kowloon, Hong Kong. It was named after John Gardiner Austin, Colonial Secretary of Hong Kong from 1868 to 1879. The northeast part of this street is noted for clubs, fields, and military buildings, while the western section is densely populated.

== Location ==
Austin Road starts at Canton Road in the west, crosses Nathan Road at roughly its halfway point, and ends at Chatham Road South in the east, dividing Tsim Sha Tsui and Yau Ma Tei.

== Landmarks ==
The Hong Kong Scout Centre, Tsim Sha Tsui Police Station and the north entrance to Kowloon Park are located along the section of the road between Canton Road and Nathan Road, while the Kowloon Bowling Green Club, the south entrance to the Gun Club Hill Barracks and St. Mary's Canossian College are found along the section between Nathan Road and Chatham Road.

== Austin Road West & Austin MTR station ==
Austin Road West (柯士甸道西) was created by extending Austin Road on the western side of Canton Road, over to the West Kowloon reclamation. The Austin station, opened on 16 August 2009, was so-named due to its proximity to Austin Road West, although this may have been more influenced by geographical considerations rather than any direct link to John Gardiner Austin himself.

== See also ==
- List of streets and roads in Hong Kong
