= Hong Kong fire =

Hong Kong fire may refer to:

== Fires ==
- 1918: Happy Valley Racecourse fire: 614 deaths after temporary grandstand collapsed onto food stalls, igniting a fire
- 1948: Wing On warehouse fire, killed 176 people
- 1953: Shek Kip Mei fire, destroyed a shanty town, leaving over 53,000 people homeless
- 1986 Cipel-Marco fur factory explosion, and subsequent fire, in a mink fur processing plant
- 1996 Pat Sin Leng wildfire, during a school's hiking expedition
- 1996 Garley Building fire, 41 deaths; started by welding during office renovation
- 2000: Protesters occupying the Immigration Tower started a fire during an attempted eviction
- 2008: Cornwall Court fire, began in a nightclub, spread throughout the building
- 2016: Amoycan Industrial Centre fire, in a self storage facility; fire burned for 108 hours
- 2024: Fire began in a gym in New Lucky House and spread
- 2025: Wang Fuk Court fire, at least 160 deaths; netting round buildings during repairs caught fire

== Other ==
- Hong Kong Fire Services Department
