= Kwong Fuk Estate =

Public housing estate in Tai Po, Hong Kong

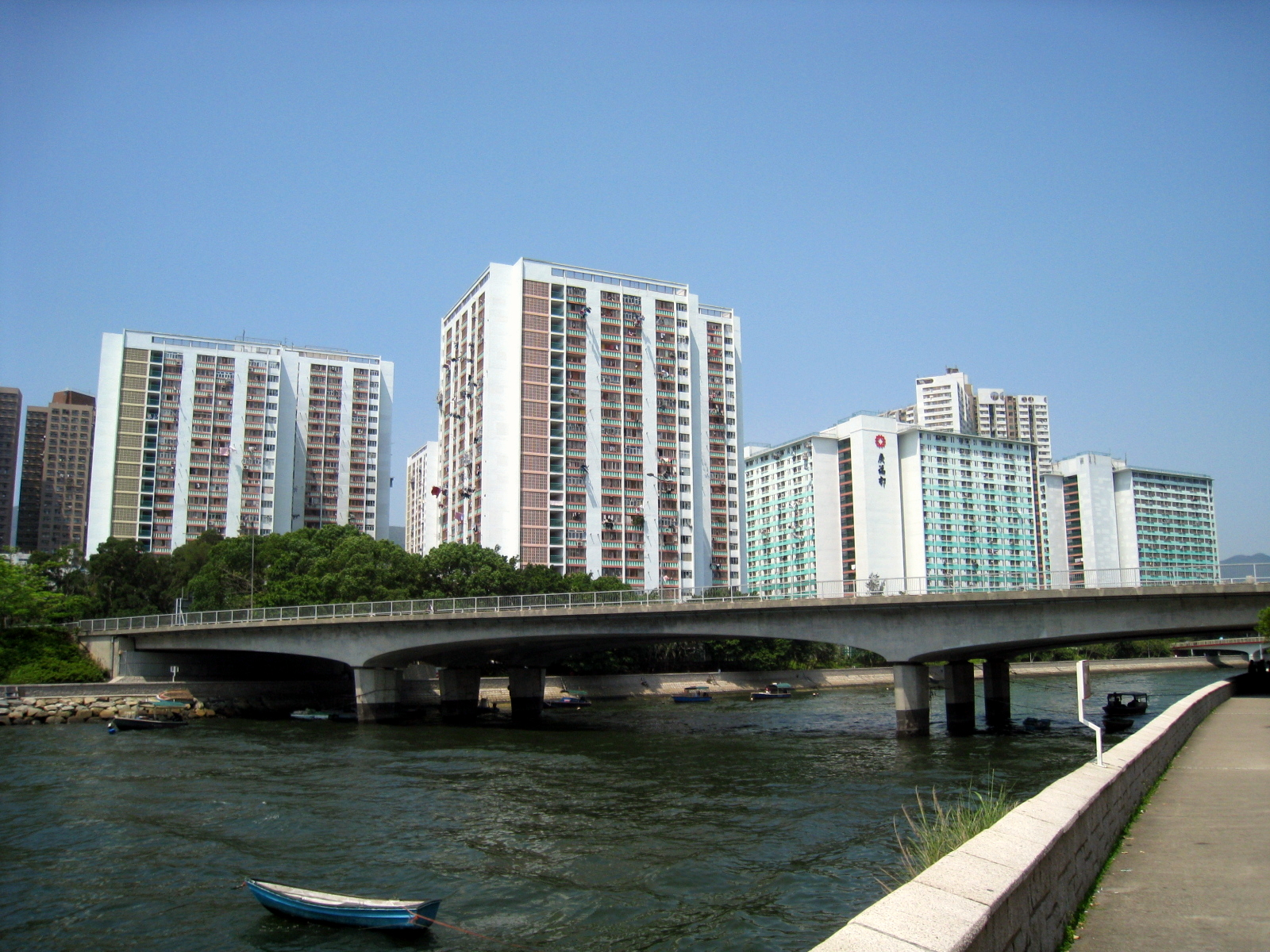
- Interactive map of Kwong Fuk Estate

General information
- Location: 28 Plover Cove Road, Tai Po; New Territories, Hong Kong
- Coordinates: 22.44873°N 114.17462°E
- Status: Completed
- Category: Public rental housing
- Population: 16,939 (2016)
- No. of blocks: 8
- No. of units: 6,189

Construction
- Constructed: 1983
- Authority: Hong Kong Housing Authority

Chinese names

Kwong Fuk Estate
- Traditional Chinese: 廣福邨
- Simplified Chinese: 广福邨
- Literal meaning: broad fortune estate
Transcriptions
Standard Mandarin
- Hanyu Pinyin: Guǎng Fú Cūn
Yue: Cantonese
- Jyutping: gwong2 fuk1 cyun1

Wang Fuk Court
- Traditional Chinese: 宏福苑
- Simplified Chinese: 宏福苑
- Literal meaning: grand fortune court
Transcriptions
Standard Mandarin
- Hanyu Pinyin: Hóng Fú Yuàn
Yue: Cantonese
- Jyutping: wang4 fuk1 jyun2

Kwong Fuk Estate (Chinese: 廣福邨) is a public housing estate in Tai Po, New Territories, Hong Kong. It is the second public housing estate in Tai Po, built at the reclaimed land at the east of Tai Po Old Market near Yuen Chau Tsai. The estate consists of eight residential buildings completed in 1983.

Wang Fuk Court (宏福苑) is a Home Ownership Scheme court in Tai Po, near Kwong Fuk Estate. It consists of eight residential buildings offering 1,987 units built in 1983. The apartment complex was destroyed when a major fire broke out on 26 November 2025, killing 168.

== Houses ==
=== Kwong Fuk Estate ===
Name	Chinese name	Building type	Completed
Kwong Yan House	廣仁樓	Old Slab	1983
Kwong Wai House	廣惠樓	Old Slab	1984
Kwong Lai House	廣禮樓	Twin Tower	1983
Kwong Yee House	廣義樓	Twin Tower	1983
Kwong Yau House	廣祐樓	Twin Tower	1983
Kwong Ping House	廣平樓	Twin Tower	1983
Kwong Chi House	廣智樓	Trident 2	1985
Kwong Shung House	廣崇樓	Trident 2	1985

=== Wang Fuk Court ===
The majority of the Wang Fuk Court apartment complex, barring Wang Chi House, was destroyed in a major fire on 26 November 2025.

Name	Chinese name	Building type	Completed
Wang Yan House	宏仁閣	Flexi 2	1983
Wang Tao House	宏道閣	Flexi 2	1983
Wang Sun House	宏新閣	Flexi 2	1983
Wang Kin House	宏建閣	Flexi 2	1983
Wang Tai House	宏泰閣	Flexi 2	1983
Wang Cheong House	宏昌閣	Flexi 2	1983
Wang Shing House	宏盛閣	Flexi 2	1983
Wang Chi House	宏志閣	Flexi 2	1983

== Demographics ==
According to the 2016 by-census, Kwong Fuk Estate had a population of 16,939 while Wang Fuk Court had a population of 4,789. Altogether the population amounts to 21,728.

== Politics ==
For the 2019 District Council election, the estate fell within two constituencies. Most of the estate is located in the Kwong Fuk & Plover Cove constituency, which was represented by Dalu Lin Kok-cheung until May 2021, while the remainder of the estate and Wang Fuk Court falls within the Wang Fuk constituency, which is represented by Herman Yiu Kwan-ho.

== Incidents ==
=== 2025 Wang Fuk Court fire ===
On 26 November 2025, a fire broke out at Wang Cheong House in Wang Fuk Court at 2:51 p.m., before spreading to six other blocks. The fire was caused by the inferior plastic net wrapped around the building. It is suspected to have mainly originated from workers smoking, as cigarette butts were found strewn on residents' window ledges, likely spreading to the flammable plastic net, then transferring to the entire building. All property windows and ventilation were also covered by highly flammable styrofoam boarding and thin wooden plates. Prior to the fire, residents already had suspicions of corruption around the renovation plans that led to the fire, citing fire hazards, a lack of transparency, and high costs. Authorities rated the fire as an alarm 5, which is the most serious category and the first such incident since the Cornwall Court fire in 2008. 168 people were killed, including a firefighter, while 79 others were injured. The apartment complex is scheduled for demolition due to the fire causing extensive damages, which rendered the apartment complex uninhabitable.

== See also ==
- Public housing estates in Tai Po
