= Miles Kwan =

Hong Kong activist (born 2001)

- 關靖豐
- Born: 2001 or 2002 (age 24–25); Hong Kong
- Education: Chinese University of Hong Kong (expelled)
- Known for: Arrested for a Wang Fuk Court fire petition

Kwan Ching Fung Miles (Chinese: 關靖豐) is a Hong Kong university student, known for being detained by the national security police in 2025 and later expelled from the Chinese University of Hong Kong, after launching a petition that called for accountability over the Wang Fuk Court fire.

== Early life ==
Miles Kwan studied for politics in the Chinese University of Hong Kong. In 2022, he was suspended by the university for a week after declining to get vaccinated amidst the COVID-19 pandemic. He was again suspended for one week in 2023, having convicted and fined for criminal damage for placing stickers on lamp-posts in 2022 to mark the anniversary of Tiananmen Square massacre. He also received a demerit each on both occasions.

== Petition and arrest ==
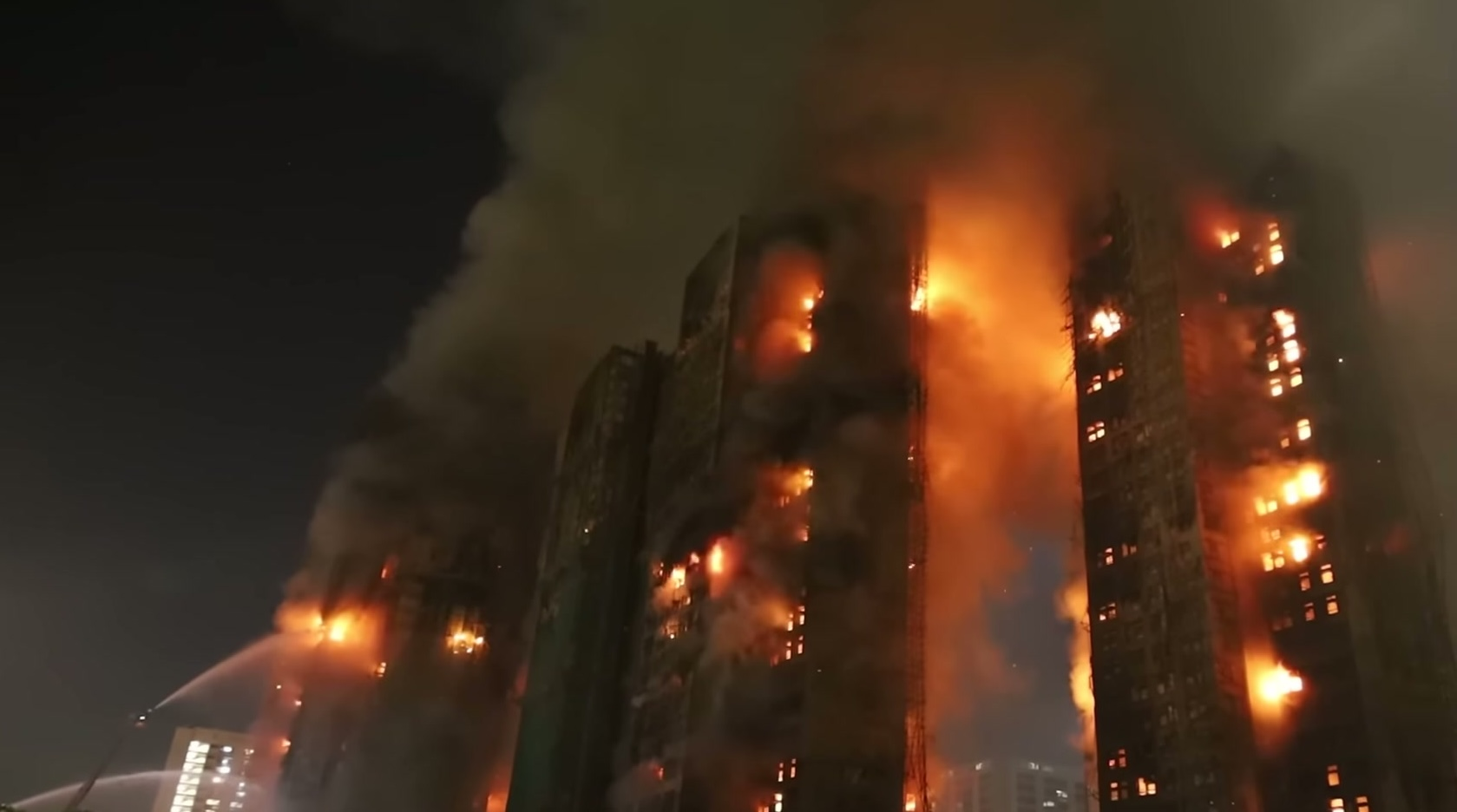
Wang Fuk Court apartments in flames

Not long after the massive fire in November 2025 that engulfed the residential complex Wang Fuk Court and killed dozens of residents, a pressure group, which Miles Kwan was part of, launched an online petition. It demanded accountability of government officials, an independent probe into possible corruption over the renovation that helped the fire spread, resettlement for the displaced residents, and a review of construction oversight. Kwan also stood outside the Tai Po Market metro station and handed out leaflets of the petition, saying that Hongkongers are united in grief and anger over the fire. The petition attracted more than 10,000 signatures.

In response, Beijing's national security office in Hong Kong condemned the petition for inciting confrontation, splitting the society, and endangering national security. Subsequently, just three days after the blaze, the petition was removed from the internet. Kwan was also arrested by Hong Kong's national security police on trying to incite sedition. After having detained for two days, Kwan was released on police bail. He later said that "If these ideas are deemed seditious or 'crossing the line', then I feel I can't predict the consequences of anything any more, and I can only do what I truly believe."

=== Reaction ===
Following Kwan's arrest, two other people, including Kenneth Cheung, a former district councillor, was arrested. The Chinese authorities accused people of exploiting the fire to turn Hong Kong back to the "black-clad violence" during the mass protests in 2019. Wen Wei Po, Chinese state-owned newspaper in Hong Kong, urged the public to be vigilant towards "anti-government elements" with "malicious intentions", claiming the group was attempted to "incite public unrest" by putting forward the demands, distributing the leaflets, and launching the petition. The mouthpiece also denounced their actions to be "utterly devoid of conscience and humanity". John Lee Ka-chiu, Hong Kong's chief executive, claimed he would "ensure justice is [served]" to anyone who attempted to "sabotage" relief efforts. He pledged to "show no tolerance" for those disrupting the unity in the society and exploiting the tragedy. Beijing's national security office also commented "anti-China disruptors" who would face the "full force" of the National Security Law. Regina Ip, convener of the Executive Council, defended the arrests of Kwan and Cheung, claiming that the Hong Kong authorities are being "extra careful" to ensure the public unrest doesn't result in a "recurrence of the 2019 riots". Ip also said the genuine expressions of opinion should be differentiated from petitions with criminal intent. Ronny Tong, an Executive Council member, citing the various suggestions and criticisms on major newspapers, said "by no means is there a general suppression of different views or criticisms of the government".

Nathan Law, an exiled activist and former legislator, said the arrests are outrageous examples of the "highly authoritarian trend" in Hong Kong, with the government worried about people congregating and initiating collective action even it is not political. Samuel Chu, a pro-democracy activist, said "It's baffling how Miles was [arrested] for asking basic questions on behalf of many residents, which the government went on to address anyway."

=== Aftermath ===
After his release, the Chinese University of Hong Kong conducted a disciplinary review into Kwan and referred the case to a discipline committee, for other "misconducts" that was not specified. In the email to the university, Kwan denounced the committee a "kangaroo panel" and a "disgrace". In February 2026, the committee decided to terminate Kwan from studies due to "multiple acts of misconduct". According to Kwan, who was about to graduate in March, while the university did not penalise him for the arrest, he received two more merits after he was accused of breaching confidentiality rules after news that he was facing disciplinary hearing circulated online, as well as disrespecting and insulting the panel. With four demerits in total, he was expelled from the university. The university said a student who is given three demerits due to disciplinary actions may be terminated from studies. Since then, there were calls demanding the university to reinstate Kwan.
