= Wong Shiu Chi Secondary School =

Wong Shiu Chi Secondary School 王肇枝中學
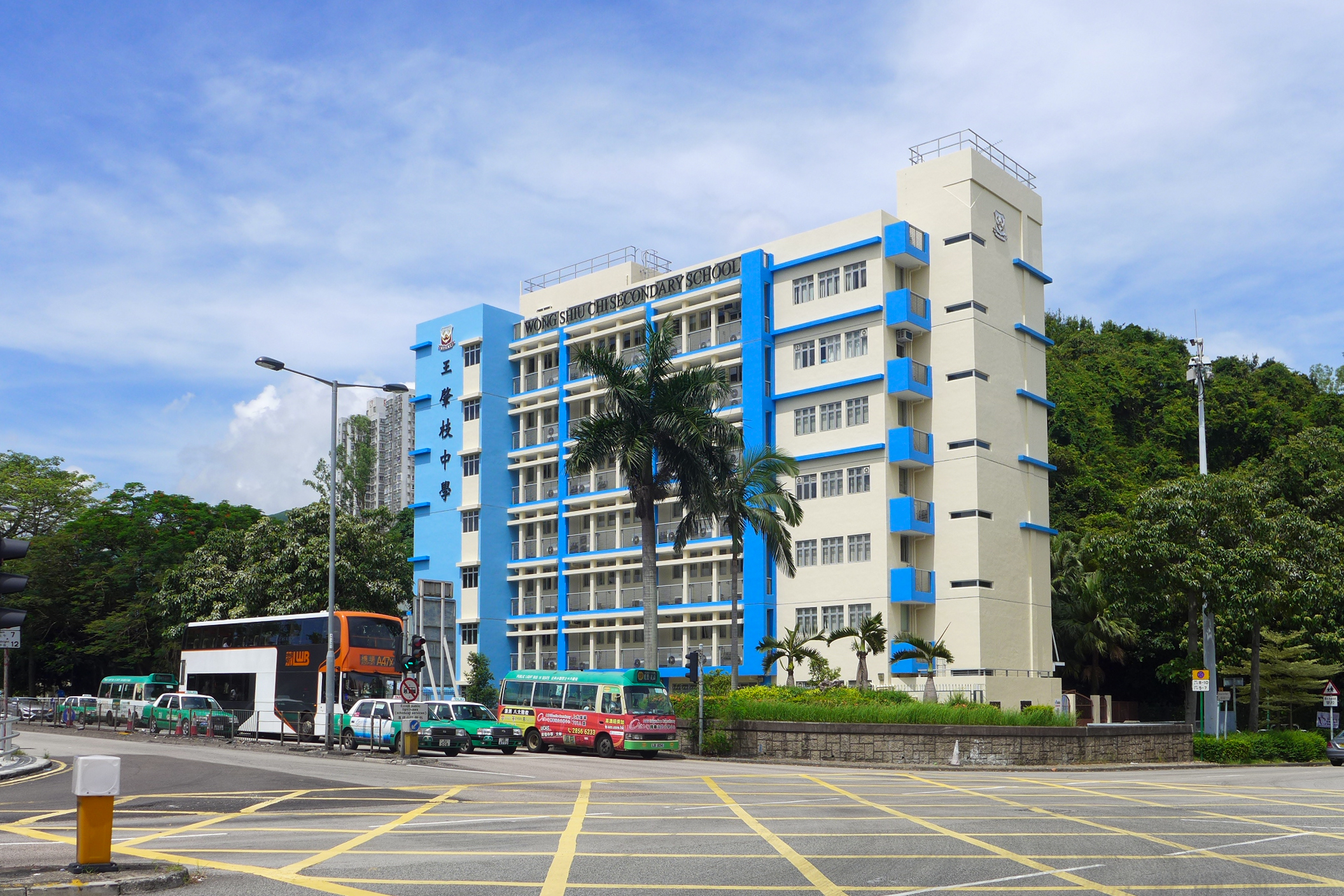
- 182 Kwong Fuk Road, Tai Po; Hong Kong

Information
- Established: 8 February 1960; 66 years ago
- Website: http://www.wscss.edu.hk

Wong Shiu Chi Secondary School (Chinese: 王肇枝中學) is a Hong Kong secondary school located in Tai Po. Founded in 1960 by Dr. Wong Tak Haen (王德馨), the school is named after her father Wong Shiu Tuen (王肇端) and mother Lai Tan Chi (黎單枝).

== Wang Fuk Court Fire ==
During the 2025 Wang Fuk Court fire, a small wildfire broke out on the hill behind the school (which was across Tai Po River from the fire) at 22:13 local time on 26 November and was largely extinguished by 23:00 on the same day. Nobody was injured in the fire.
