= 2025 National Games for Persons with Disabilities of China =

Multi-sport event in China

12th National Games for Persons with Disabilities & the 9th National Special Olympic Games of the People's Republic of China
- Logo of the 2025 National Games for Persons with Disabilities of China
- Host city: Guangdong, Hong Kong and Macau
- Country: China
- Motto: Dream for the Games in GBA (simplified Chinese: 追梦大湾区，出彩人生路; traditional Chinese: 追夢大灣區，出彩人生路; Portuguese: Sonhos na Grande Baía, Caminhos para uma vida esplêndida)
- Events: 46 sports
- Opening: 8 December 2025
- Closing: 15 December 2025
- Closed by: State Councilor Shen Yiqin
- Main venue: Shenzhen Sports Center Arena (closing ceremony)
- Website: Official website; Hong Kong Competition Zone Official website; Macau Competition Zone Official website

The 12th National Games for Persons with Disabilities and the 9th National Special Olympic Games of China (simplified Chinese: 中华人民共和国第十二届残疾人运动会暨第九届特殊奥林匹克运动会; traditional Chinese: 中華人民共和國第十二屆殘疾人運動會暨第九屆特殊奧林匹克運動會; Portuguese: 12.ª edição dos Jogos Nacionais para Pessoas Portadoras de Deficiência e 9.ª edição dos Jogos Olímpicos Especiais Nacionais da República Popular da China) was a multi-sports event being held throughout Guangdong, Hong Kong and Macau from 8 to 15 December 2025 (though some events took place before the Games started). It is the second time Guangdong had hosted the National Games for Persons with Disabilities and the National Special Olympic Games, after 1992 and 1987 respectively, and the first time the two special administrative regions of China; Hong Kong and Macau, have hosted the for Persons with Disabilities and the National Special Olympic Games. It is also the first time in the history of the National Games for Persons with Disabilities and the National Special Olympic Games that it is co-hosted by multiple provinces.

The torch relay and opening ceremony were scheduled to be held on 29 November and 8 December respectively, but these events have been cancelled due to reactions for Wang Fuk Court fire in Hong Kong. The simplified closing event will be held after all concluded competitions on 15 December.

== Venues ==
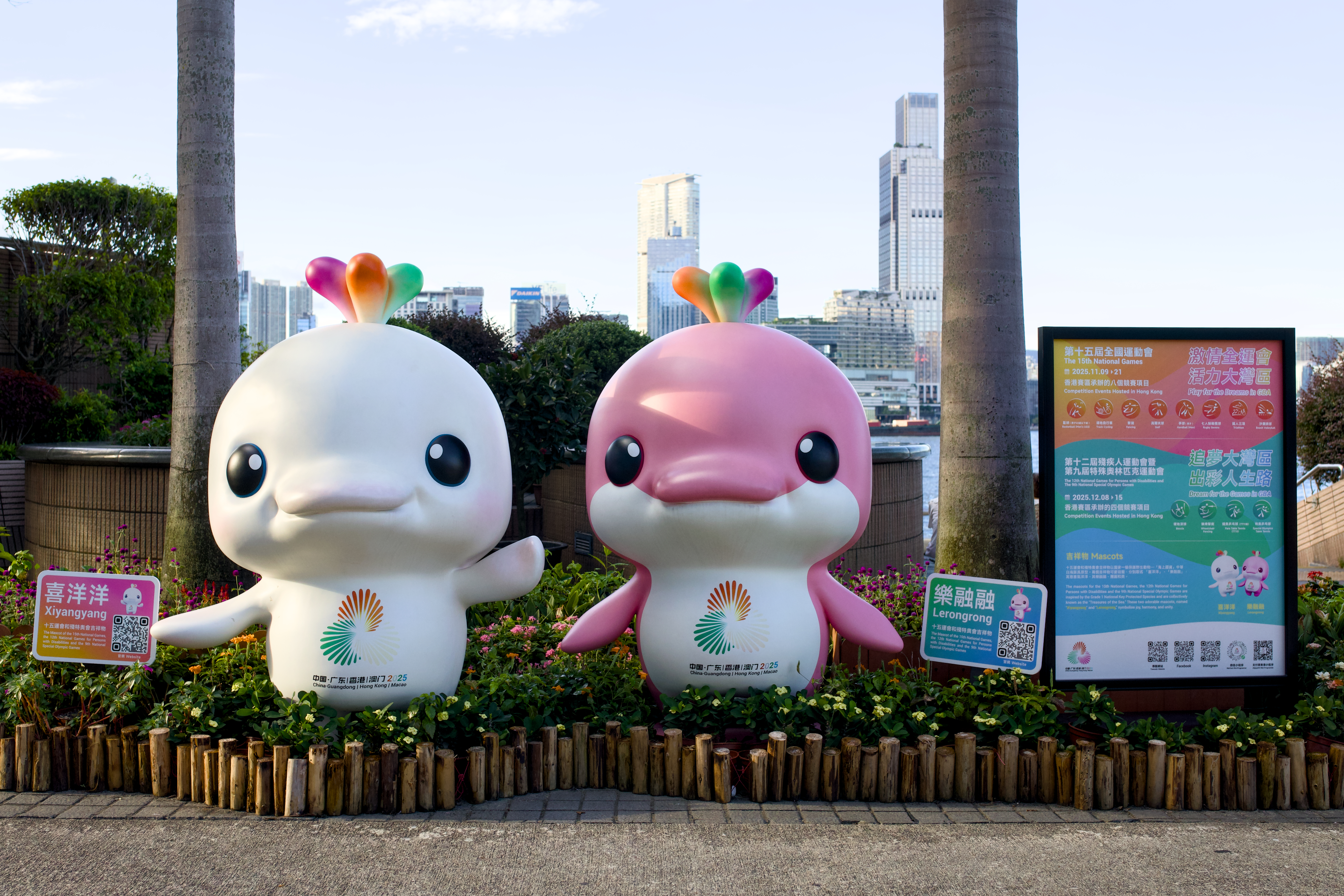
Statues of "Xi Yang Yang" and "Le Rong Rong", the 12th National Games for Persons with Disabilities and the 9th National Special Olympic Games of China Mascots, at the Golden Bauhinia Square, Hong Kong

=== Guangdong ===
==== Guangzhou ====
| Venue | Events | Capacity | Status |
|---|---|---|---|
| Tianhe Sports Center Stadium | Opening ceremony (cancelled) | 54,856 | Existing |
| Guangdong Olympic Sports Center Stadium | Para/Deaf Athletics | 80,012 | Existing |
| Guangzhou Gymnasium | Wheelchair Basketball | 10,000 | Existing |
| Guangzhou University City Sports Center Auxiliary Field | Football 5-a-side | 860 | Existing with temporary stands |
| South China Agricultural University Sports Center | Sitting volleyball | 8,000 | New |
| Guangdong Shooting Range | Shooting | 800 | Existing |
| Guangdong International Rowing Centre | Rowing | TBD | Existing with temporary stands |
| Guangdong International Rowing Centre | Canoeing | TBD | Existing with temporary stands |
| Guangzhou Sports Vocational and Technical College Gymnasium | Table tennis (all events except category TT11) | 1,700 | Existing |
| Guangzhou Disabled Persons Sports Center Gymnasium | Goalball | 369 | Existing |

==== Shenzhen ====
| Venue | Events | Capacity | Status |
|---|---|---|---|
| Shenzhen Sports Center Arena | Closing ceremony | 16,000 | Existing, replacement |
| Shenzhen Universiade Sports Centre Natatorium | Para Swimming | 3,000 | Existing |
| Shenzhen Sports Center Fields | Archery | TBD | Temporary |
| Shenzhen Longgang Sports Center Velodrome | Cycling (track) | TBD | Existing |
| Longkou Reservoir | Cycling (road) | TBD | Temporary |
| Shenzhen Marathon Route | Athletics (marathon) | TBD | Temporary |

==== Dongguan ====
| Venue | Events | Capacity | Status |
|---|---|---|---|
| Dongguan Sports Center Gymnasium | Women's deaf basketball | 4,000 | Existing |
| Shilong Middle School Gymnasium | Para Powerlifting | 2,894 | Existing |

==== Foshan ====
| Venue | Events | Capacity | Status |
|---|---|---|---|
| Century Lotus Stadium | Football 7-a-side | 36,686 | Existing |
| Nanhai Sports Center Stadium | Football 7-a-side | 20,000 | Existing |
| Shunde Desheng Sports Center Gymnasium | Men's deaf basketball | 12,000 | New |
| Shunde Sports Center Gymnasium | Men's deaf basketball | 2,672 | Existing |

==== Huizhou ====
| Venue | Events | Capacity | Status |
|---|---|---|---|
| Huizhou Gymnasium | Taekwondo | 6,527 | Existing |

==== Jiangmen ====
| Venue | Events | Capacity | Status |
|---|---|---|---|
| Jiangmen Sports Center Gymnasium | Special Olympic Basketball | 8,500 | Existing |
| Jiangmen Sports Center Natatorium | Special Olympic Swimming | 2,200 | Existing |
| Jiangmen Sports Center Auxiliary Field | Special Olympic Football | TBD | Existing |

==== Zhaoqing ====
| Venue | Events | Capacity | Status |
|---|---|---|---|
| Sihui Sports Center Gymnasium | Judo | 5,050 | Existing |
| Yanyang Lake Park | Triathlon | TBD | Temporary |

==== Zhongshan ====
| Venue | Events | Capacity | Status |
|---|---|---|---|
| Zhongshan Gymnasium | Special Olympic Boccia | 5,000 | Existing |
| Zhongshan Sports Center Stadium | Special Olympic Athletics | 12,000 | Existing |
| Zhongshan Torch Development Zone No.1 Middle School Gymnasium | Special Olympic Powerlifting | 3,007 | Existing |
| Zhongshan Torch Development Zone International Convention and Exhibition Center | Special Olympic Roller Skating | TBD | Existing with temporary stands |

==== Zhuhai ====
| Venue | Events | Capacity | Status |
|---|---|---|---|
| Hengqin International Tennis Center | Wheelchair Tennis | 5,000 (center court) | Existing |

=== Hong Kong ===
| Venue | Events | Capacity | Status |
|---|---|---|---|
| Kai Tak Sports Park Arena | Para Boccia | 10,000 | Existing |
| Ma On Shan Gymnasium | Wheelchair Fencing | TBD | Existing |
| Tsuen Wan Sports Centre | Para Table Tennis (TT11) | TBD | Existing |
| Tsuen Wan Sports Centre | Special Olympic Table Tennis | TBD | Existing |

=== Macau ===
| Venue | Events | Capacity | Status |
|---|---|---|---|
| Macau East Asian Games Dome | Para Badminton | 7,000 | Existing |
| Macao Forum | Special Olympic Badminton | 4,000 | Existing |

== See also ==
- 2025 National Games of China
