= 1996 Pat Sin Leng wildfire =

Hong Kong fire in 1996

Coordinates: 22.4835°N 114.2165°E

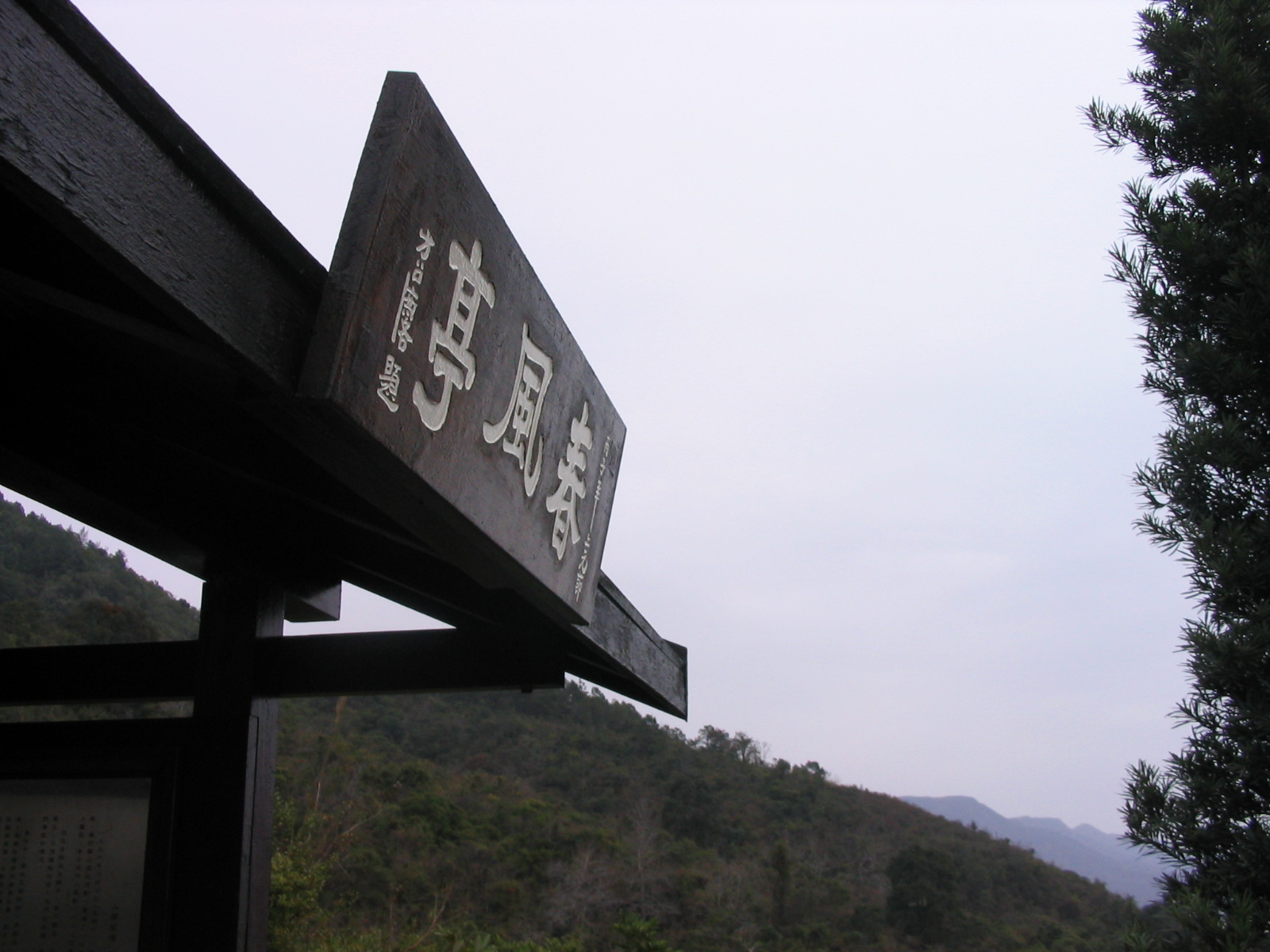
- The "Spring Breeze Pavilion" built in commemoration
- Date: February 10, 1996
- Location: Pat Sin Leng, Tai Po, New Territories, Hong Kong
- Type: Wildfire
- Deaths: 5 (+1 related suicide)
- Injuries: 13

The 1996 Pat Sin Leng wildfire took place in Pat Sin Leng, Tai Po, New Territories, Hong Kong on 10 February, 1996 (Saturday). It was the worst wildfire in local history. The disaster killed three students and two teachers at the Hong Kong Chinese Women's Club Fung Yiu King Memorial Secondary School and injured a further 13 students.

The Hong Kong Government built a "Spring Breeze Pavilion" on Pat Sin Leng to commemorate the two teachers who died saving the students in the tragedy.

After the disaster, the area suffered from soil erosion, but the vegetation has since regrown.

== Background events ==
On 10 February 1996, 49 students of HKCWC Fung Yiu King Memorial Secondary School were led by five teachers in the "Golden Leg" Hiking activities which were held jointly by Geographic Society of the school and the Duke of Edinburgh Award Scheme (now Hong Kong Award for Young People). The plan was to hike from the Agriculture and Fisheries Department Plover Cove Country Park Visitor Centre to Hok Tau, Fanling via Section 9 and 10 of Wilson Trail on Pat Sin Leng.

It was an extremely dry day with a relative humidity of 31 per cent. The Hong Kong Observatory had issued a Red Fire Danger Warning, warning of a very high risk of wildfires.

The fire was discovered at about 11:20, just as the group was around 150 metres away from Hsien Ku Fung. The fire quickly spread upwards, out of control. As the downhill escape route was blocked by the fire, the group was forced to flee up hill. Thirty-two students escaped and raised the alarm; but 18 people were trapped by a rockface of several meters tall, commonly called as Ma Lau Ai (Monkey Cliff). Teachers Chow Chi-Tsai and Wong Shuo Mei perished attempting to help students escape, while other injured students were left on the cliff waiting for rescue.

== Rescue operation ==
More than 200 staff and volunteers from the Hong Kong Fire Service department, Agriculture and Fisheries Department (AFD), and the Civil Aid Service (CAS) were dispatched and the search and rescue operation commenced at 12:23. The Government Flying Service (GFS) sent two helicopters to help fight the fire and rescue the severely injured. Rescuers provided first aid on the scene. Seriously injured victims were rushed to hospital by helicopters, while those with less severe injuries were carried away by the rescue crew. The first group of victims were sent to Tai Po Jockey Club Clinic. Ten seriously injured victims were transferred to the Prince of Wales Hospital in Sha Tin, which has a specialist burns unit. A female who suffered burns to 70 per cent of her skin was rushed to the intensive care unit for advance treatment.

=== Government Flying Service rescue accident ===
An unusual incident occurred with the Government Flying Service's helicopter in the rescue operation. Two casualties were spotted when crew members landed using the helicopter's winch sling. In accordance with the Code of Practice, they fastened their safety belt before pulling the victims onto the helicopter. However, due to his sight being obscured by the smoke, the pilot was unable to see the victims. The helicopter succeeded only in lifting the rescuer as it climbed, as the harness was not properly fastened around the casualties.

The helicopter returned to rescue two casualties, who were thought to be those who fell during previous rescue, but they were proved mistaken. The next day, rescuers found the last missing person, and found he was one of the victims who fell in the initial rescue attempt.

== Casualties and damage ==
The wildfire burnt for over 40 hours. At 11:00 the following day, all fires were extinguished.

- Casualties: 5 (Teachers Chow Chi-Tsai, Wong Shuo Mei and three students)
- Injured: 13
- Burnt area: 20 hectares

A hiker Tam Ka-Fat, who had assisted the evacuation of four students (2 of which later succumbed to injuries), subsequently committed suicide via immolation on 13 July 1996 due to suspected PTSD/mental stress from fire.

== Post-disaster review ==
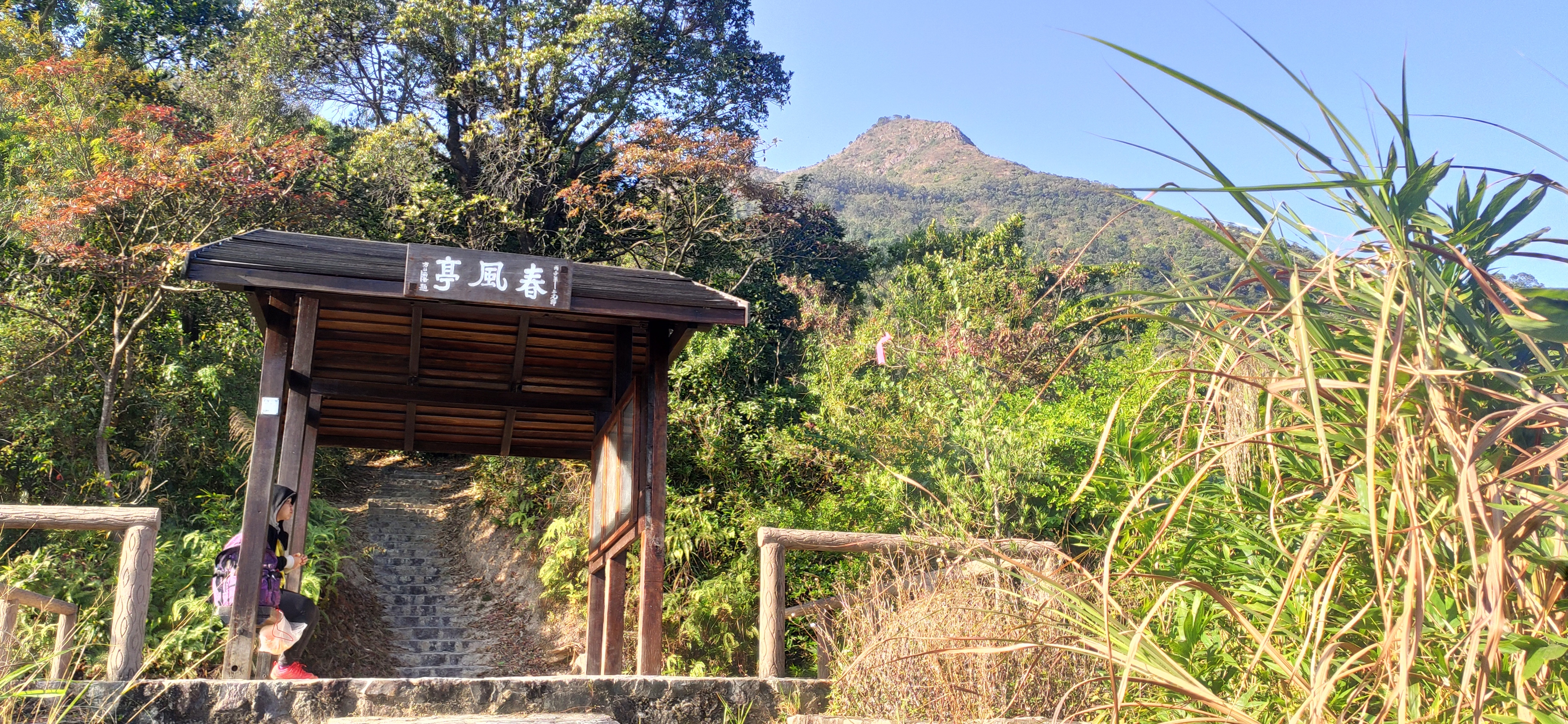
The Spring Breeze Pavilion (2019)

- The Coroner's Court hearings were held in May 1996. The coroner believed that the fire was caused by students smoking. The court also noted that the teacher-student ratio was 1 to 12, less than the 1 to 10 standard. The teachers also did not have appropriate telecommunication devices.
- Some criticised the procedure that ambulances had to carry patients to the nearest emergency department, before transferring patients to a better-equipped hospital, prolonging the journey by four kilometres and delaying treatment. Furthermore, The Tai Po Jockey Club Clinic (the only medical centre in Tai Po at the time) lacked the ability to handle any large-scale crisis.
- Another criticism was that the Hong Kong Government's emergency Co-ordination Centre was not in operation during this incident, hence the search and rescue effort was somewhat lacking in co-ordination.
