= Wing On warehouse fire =

1948 fire in Hong Kong

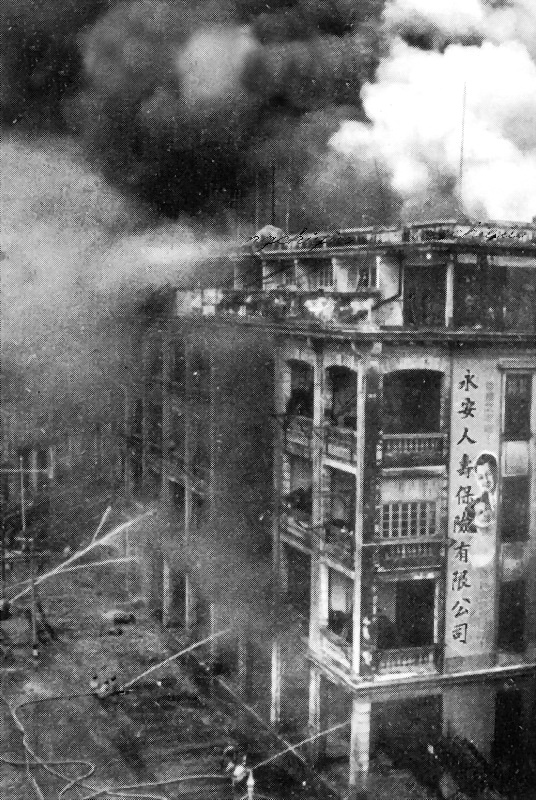
- The Wing On warehouse on fire
- Date: 22 September 1948; 77 years ago
- Time: 08:05 (HKT)
- Venue: Wing On
- Location: Sai Wan, Central and Western District, British Hong Kong
- Type: Structure fire
- Cause: Explosion
- Deaths: 176
- Injuries: 69

The Wing On warehouse fire was a fire that occurred on September 22, 1948 on Des Voeux West Road in Sai Wan, then part of British Hong Kong. There were 176 deaths and 69 injuries. It was the second deadliest fire in the history of Hong Kong, after the Happy Valley Racecourse fire in 1918, and is comparable in fatalities to the 2025 Wang Fuk Court fire.

During the fire two people jumped to their deaths. The ground floor of the building contained dangerous goods, including celluloid and crepe rubber, while the four stories above were home to 36 flats. Despite heavy rain and the efforts of firefighters, the fire grew, with sparks reaching a height of more than one hundred feet (roughly 30 m). Total damages were an estimated $4 million (1948 USD).
