= 1986 Cipel-Marco fur factory explosion =

Factory explosion in Hong Kong

On 8 October 1986, an explosion occurred at the Cipel-Marco fur factory located on the third floor of Wing Loi Industrial Building on Wing Lap Street, Kwai Chung, Hong Kong. The explosion was followed by a massive fire, which ultimately resulted in 14 deaths and 10 injuries. It is one of the most significant industrial accidents in Hong Kong's history.

== Background ==
The factory owner, a foreign national, had established the plant about a year earlier. It occupied two units in the Wing Loi Industrial Building, totaling more than 10,000 square feet. The factory mainly engaged in mink fur processing, including deodorizing and anti-mold treatments. There were over sixty employees working in two shifts—day and night.

== Incident ==
At the time of the incident, workers were operating as usual, placing mink furs into steam ovens for processing. They failed to notice that the bearings of a large drum used for leather treatment had overheated, causing the sawdust attached to the drum to reach high temperatures.

At 7:08 p.m. on 8 October 1986, the high temperature ignited flammable gases in the air, triggering an explosion. The blast caused the fire to spread rapidly. The factory's sprinkler system activated, which helped reduce the flames. At 7:10 p.m., firefighters arrived and began to combat the blaze, which was later upgraded to a three-alarm fire. Ambulances transported the injured to Princess Margaret Hospital for treatment. The fire was extinguished by 8:06 p.m.

== Investigation ==
The accident was suspected to have been caused by flammable cleaning liquid—benzene, used in the steam cleaning room. When benzene vapors were exposed to air for some time, the flammable concentration reached 1.3% to 7.1%. Once ignited, an explosion would occur immediately.

== Aftermath ==
The explosion and fire highlighted loopholes in Hong Kong's regulation of industrial hazardous chemicals at the time. The incident aroused widespread public concern, with many criticizing the factory's inadequate safety measures. It also prompted the government to implement the Factories and Industrial Undertakings (Dangerous Substances) Regulations Cap.79AB in 1988 to strengthen the management of hazardous chemicals and enhance occupational health and safety workers.

Meanwhile, labor and social organizations demanded legislation requiring factories to provide employees with information about the properties and protective measures related to chemicals used in the workplace. They also advocated the adoption of non-flammable chemicals to reduce the risk of similar disasters.
