= Wang Fuk Court fire =

2025 apartment fire in Tai Po, Hong Kong

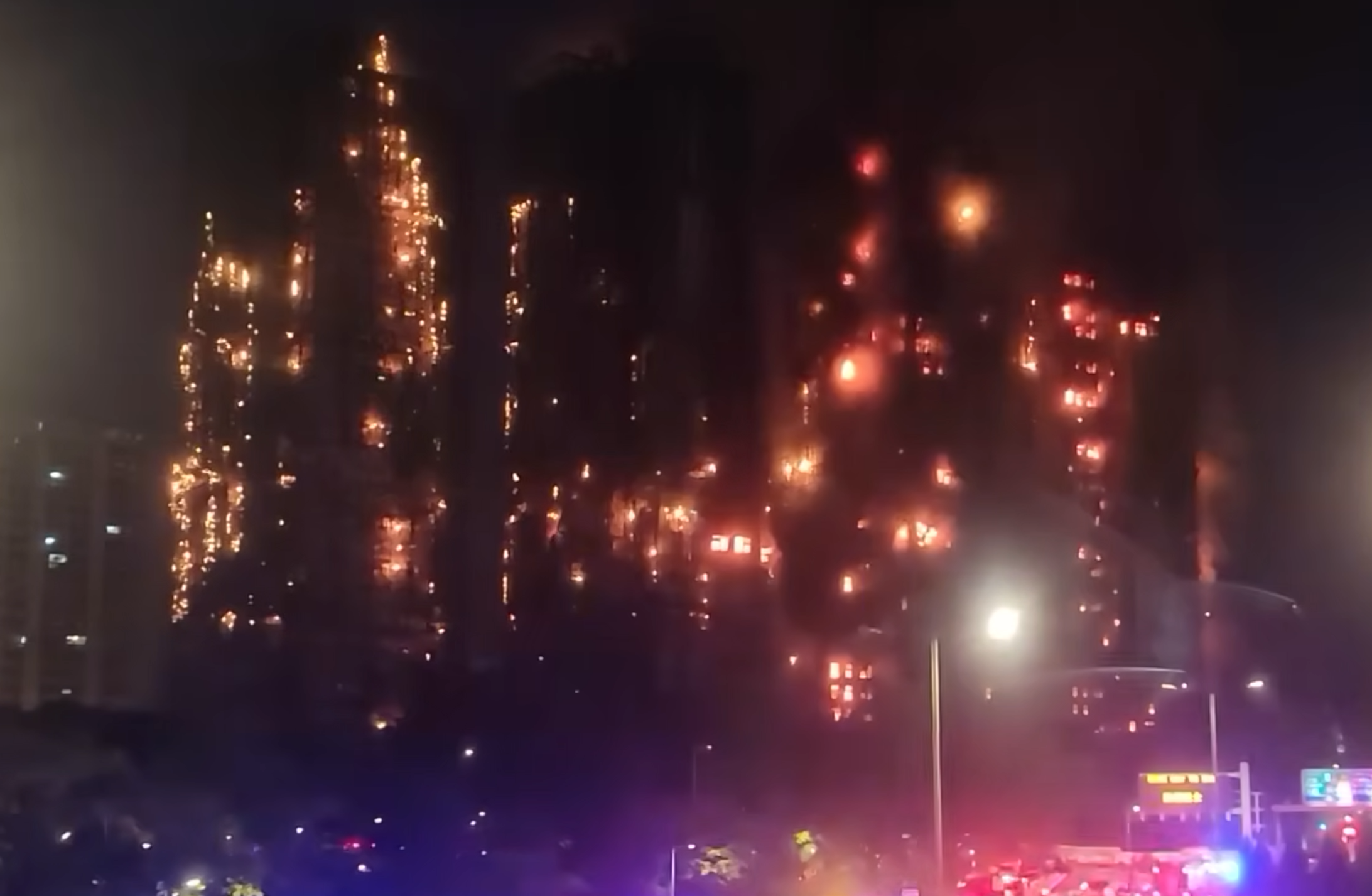
- Time: ~14:00, 26 November 2025 – 10:18, 28 November 2025 (HKT, UTC+08:00)
- Duration: 44 hours 18 minutes
- Location: Wang Fuk Court Tai Po, New Territories, Hong Kong; 22.44647°N 114.17627°E
- Type: Residential high‑rise fire
- Cause: The preliminary investigation determined that it was caused by a cigarette butt left behind from smoking.
- Deaths: 168
- Injuries: 79
- Displaced: approximately 4600
- Arrests: 22

On 26 November 2025, a large fire broke out at the Wang Fuk Court apartment complex in Tai Po, New Territories, Hong Kong, and burned for 44 hours and 18 minutes. Seven out of the eight blocks of the complex were consumed by the fire. The incident killed 168 people, including one firefighter, and injured 79. Most casualties were found inside their apartments. It was the first five-alarm fire in Hong Kong since the 2008 Cornwall Court fire, which resulted in 4 deaths and 55 injuries, and the deadliest fire accident in Hong Kong since the 1948 Wing On warehouse fire, which resulted in 176 deaths.

At the time of the fire, the apartment complex was undergoing major repairs to the exterior walls of all eight residential towers. Bamboo scaffolding was erected to the full height of the buildings and was wrapped in construction safety nets and tarps. As early as 14:00 HKT (UTC+08:00) at Wang Cheong House (Block F), the safety netting covering the lower floors was ignited. Flammable expanded polystyrene foam (Styrofoam) boards covering the windows acted as potential accelerants for the fire, which quickly spread inside the building and then to the adjacent blocks.

== Background ==
=== Wang Fuk Court and the renovation ===
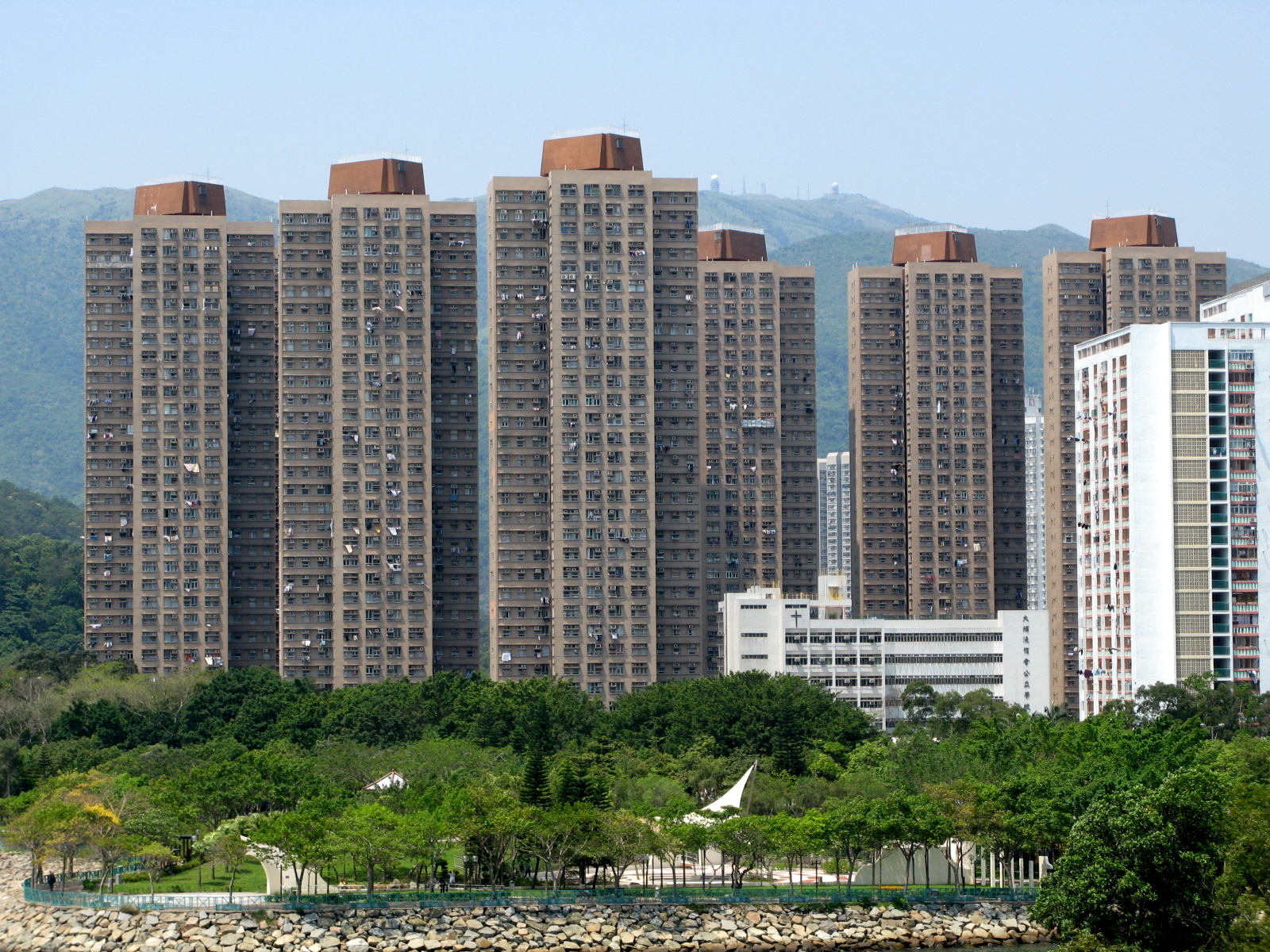
Wang Fuk Court in 2009

Wang Fuk Court is a subsidised government Home Ownership Scheme housing complex located in Tai Po, which is part of the Tai Po District in the New Territories, Hong Kong. The estate was built in 1983 and has eight residential blocks, each 31 storeys tall with nearly 2,000 units in total. They are among the tallest buildings in Tai Po. According to the 2021 population census, there were 4,643 residents in the complex. Data from the same census showed that nearly 40% of the residents were senior citizens aged 65 and above.

An inspection in 2016 mandated large-scale repairs for the estate. In January 2024, the owners' corporation (Note: Owners of an estate are to form a corporation for the estate's maintenance and upkeep.) presented three repair plans, with costs ranging from HK$150 million (US$19.31 million) to HK$330 million (US$42.47 million). The first two plans, both estimated at HK$150 million, were either to repair only the damaged parts of the exterior with tessera tiles, or to repair the damaged parts and apply waterproof paint. The third plan, which was eventually chosen, was estimated at HK$330 million and entailed completely rebuilding the exterior walls and paving them with tessera. The registered contractor was Prestige Construction and Engineering Company. The project's structural engineering consultancy was provided by Will Power Architects Company Limited, whose two directors were arrested after the fire by the ICAC in connection with suspected corruption during the renovations. In June 2024, Prestige could not source the original tessera tiles and switched to ceramic tiles.

Prestige Construction had a prior history of safety violations. The company was convicted of two safety offences in a project in the Mid-Levels in November 2023, and was fined three times in 2023 for separate violations totalling HK$30,000. A shareholder of the company was imprisoned in 2009 for bribing the Housing Society.

At the time of the fire, all eight buildings of the complex were enveloped in bamboo scaffolding and green safety netting for external renovation. Furthermore, the interior windows of each floor's elevator room and all exterior windows had been sealed with flammable polystyrene.

There had been a renovation in the past year prior to the fire, and an investigation has been launched into suspected corruption related to the renovation.

=== Warnings to the government before the fire ===
In 2023, other residents filed reports to the government about fire hazards, including the safety nets, foam boards, and smoking, but said their reports did not result in any changes.

Since July 2024, the Labour Department had conducted 16 inspections of the site, with the final inspection occurring just one week before the fire. Three prosecutions had been initiated and six improvement notices issued during this period. The Labour Department said that when conducting the 16 inspections, it found that the complaints over workers smoking at the site were unsubstantiated. However, Senior Counsel Victor Dawes in April 2026 said that the initial cause of the fire was likely a cigarette in a stairwell.

In September 2024, some residents contacted the Labour Department, asking if the nets were safe, with the department answering "The chances of fire breaking out on scaffolding nets are low." A report was also made to the Labour Department regarding construction workers smoking near the nets, but the issue was not resolved.

In November 2024, a resident called the Fire Services Department to ask about the foam boards covering the windows, to which the department said there were no regulations and the foam boards were not illegal. Multiple people had complained to the FSD, with the assistant commissioner of the FSD saying "The issue of fixing polystyrene boards on building windows was not under the purview of the FSD."

Near the end of 2024, a resident went to the government's ICAC department twice to report corruption with the project's consultant and construction contractor. ICAC told him that they would not begin any investigations based on his complaint, saying it was a business dispute. He went again in April 2025 with a second resident to the ICAC office but was told there was no evidence to pursue the case. A third resident later went to the ICAC office but the complaint did not result in ICAC investigating the report. The second resident later said "Why did [the ICAC] not take our reports at the time, but it immediately arrested people two days after the incident?"

In early 2025, residents visited the government's Urban Renewal Authority (URA) to report issues with the project, but were told that they should deal directly with the consultant.

In October 2025, about a month before the fire, a resident at Wang Fuk filed two reports to the government's Housing Department about the quality of the safety nets, asking authorities to review the nets as soon as possible. The department did not mention in its reply if the department had inspected the nets.

In April 2026, one resident whose family members were killed in the fire, stated that his family had previously complained about the project to ICAC and to the Home Affairs Department, and that the fire could have been avoided if the government had taken the complaints seriously.

In March 2026, the government's Labour Department, Fire Services Department, and the Housing Bureau's Independent Checking Unit all denied that it was their responsibility to check that the construction materials met fireproof safety regulations. In July 2026, survivors of the fire blamed government departments for denying responsibility for the fire.

=== Bamboo scaffolding and construction safety netting ===
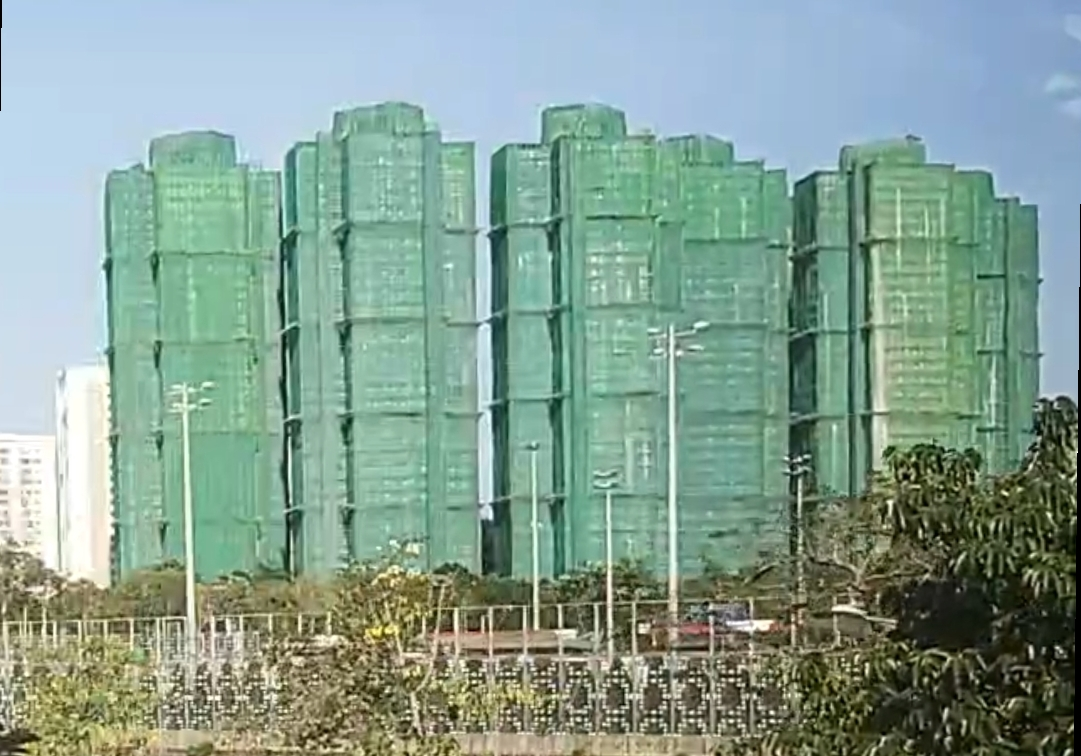
Wang Fuk Court the day before the fire, enveloped in bamboo scaffolding and green safety netting

In 2025, several fires occurred in Hong Kong that were related to structures with bamboo scaffolding encased in construction safety nets, including one at Texaco Road, Tsuen Wan in February, and in October at Chinachem Tower in Central, at the Casa Delight construction site, and at a University of Hong Kong dormitory.

Bamboo scaffolding is typically used in Hong Kong building construction and maintenance. According to a January 2025 estimate by industry representatives, nearly 80% of scaffolding in Hong Kong was bamboo-based. The chairperson of the Hong Kong Institution of Safety Practitioners, Lee Kwong-sing, stated that bamboo scaffolding and fire-retardant netting that meets government requirements are not easily ignited, and that the main cause of such fires is usually the presence of a large amount of debris, which can readily combust when exposed to sparks generated during the construction process. The Labour Department made several inspections of the construction site and found that the safety nets were certified to meet flame retardant standards.

While the Labour Department has issued safety guidelines that stipulate that the netting used with bamboo scaffolding must meet certain flame-retardant requirements, the guidelines have no legal effects or ramifications if ignored. Flame-retardant netting used in a scaffolding of 18 metres (59 ft) by 2 m (6.6 ft) would cost HK$90 (US$11.58) and has to be disposed after a single use due to the flame retardant properties degrading under the sun due to UV and environmental exposure, while an ordinary netting without fire retardancy would cost HK$50 (US$6.44) and is reusable. Consequently, some construction sites may have opted to use ordinary netting without flame retardancy as a cost-saving measure.

On 17 March 2025, government authorities announced that they would begin to phase out the use of bamboo and replace it with metal scaffolding, stating that bamboo deteriorates over time, has contributed to 23 deaths in scaffolding-related accidents since 2018, and is combustible. After the Chinachem Tower fire, the Buildings Department issued a statement urging enhanced flame-retardant standards for construction safety nets used for exterior walls at construction sites.

=== Other potential contributory factors ===
Residents had alleged as early as September 2024 that the construction workers had been smoking, littering cigarette butts throughout the construction site. A former security staff also claimed that as early as May 2025, he had found the fire alarm system intentionally turned off so that workers could enter and exit buildings more conveniently. Authorities also suspected that some materials on the exterior bamboo walls did not meet fire resistance standards, allowing the fast spread of the fire. The construction safety netting enclosed the buildings in a manner that created a chimney effect, promoting strong upward convection, fuelling rapid fire growth. Additionally, some of the windows in stairs were converted from glass to wood, so that workers could enter and exit the exterior more conveniently.

On the day of the fire, Hong Kong was affected by the northeast monsoon season. The weather was dry with strong winds. The relative humidity recorded in the district area for that afternoon was 40% to 50%. A Red Fire Danger Warning was issued by the Hong Kong Observatory on 24 November due to dry conditions; it remained in effect on the day of the fire.

== Fire ==
=== Early signs ===
A witness on the bicycle path remarks in shock four times that there are no fire alarms

01s: Fire at 4th floor
16s: Firefighters arrive
28s: Fire at 8th floor
32s: Spread to adjacent block

The fire is believed to have started from the safety netting covering the lower floors of Wang Cheong House (Block F). As early as 14:00 HKT (UTC+08:00) on 26 November 2025, signs of a fire at Wang Cheong House (Block F) first appeared when a resident at Wang Shing House (Block G) smelled smoke through her window. Through a gap in the mesh, she spotted a small flame burning in an apartment unit in Block F and attempted to contact the property management office to no avail. She then went down to the ground floor, only to be told by the security guard at the lift lobby that there was a fire. She went back to her apartment unit and sheltered in place until she was rescued. By 14:45, there were more eyewitness reports of the bamboo scaffolding along the exterior walls of Wang Cheong House having caught fire. Seen in the first video posted on social media, a bystander outside repeatedly shouted in dismay that there was no fire alarm.

=== Spread ===
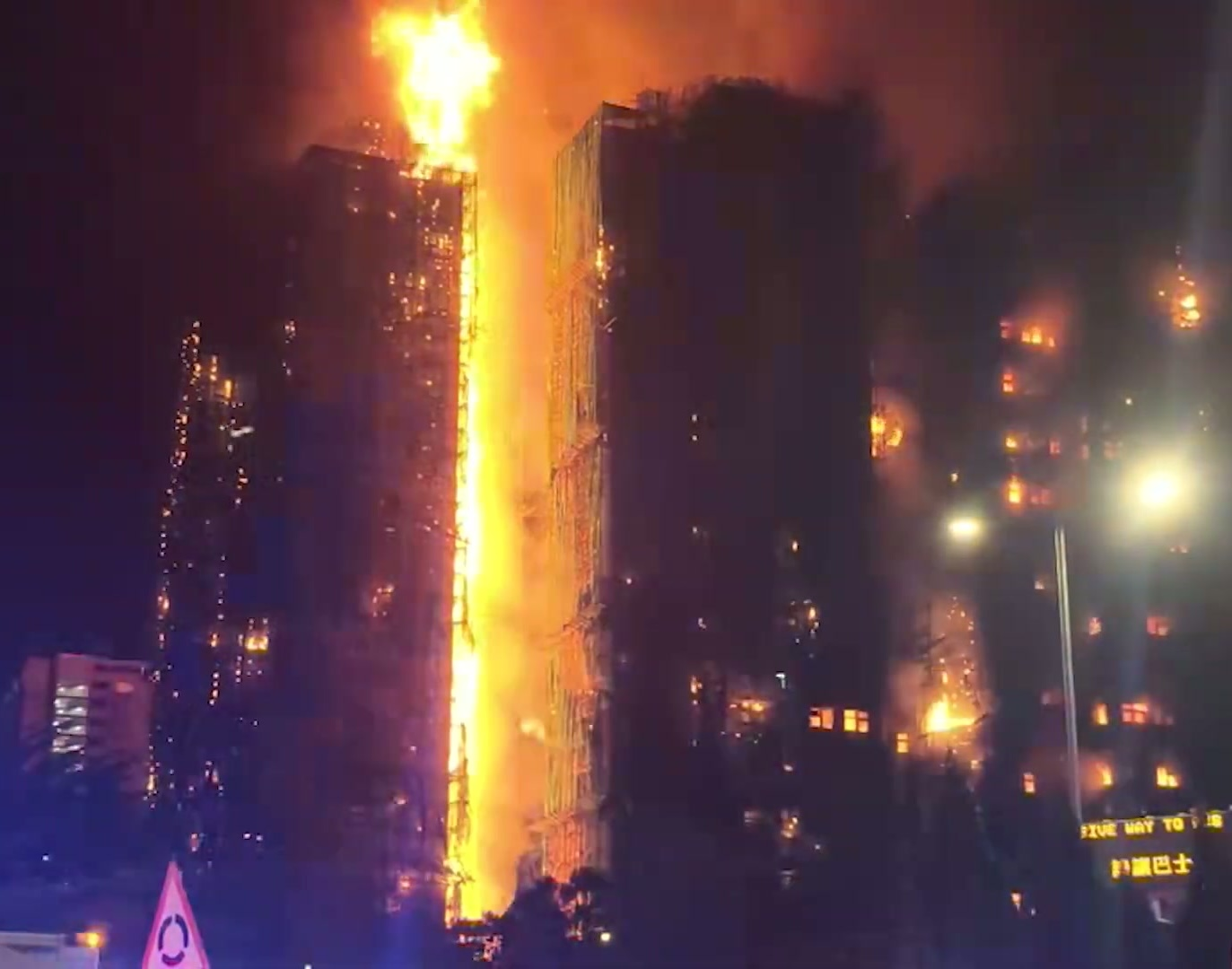
Flames along a wall of one of the buildings

The fire department received the first report of a fire at 14:51; firefighters arrived in ten minutes, but the fire had already escalated rapidly. The police received reports from passersby at around 15:00 and subsequently more calls from residents who reported that they were unable to escape. Some residents stated that they did not hear the fire alarm sirens even though they had broken the fire alarm glass and pressed the button; it was later determined that none of the fire alarms had activated in any of the eight towers. Other residents were notified of the fire through communication groups and neighbours knocking on doors.

The emergency alert was raised from a 1 alarm to 4 by 15:34, and to the highest level, 5, by 18:22. The emergency response included 128 fire engines, 57 ambulances and 767 firefighters. The fire began spreading on the scaffolding, moving indoors through the windows and then to all but one of the other buildings. At 20:15, the fire department reported that the conditions on scene continued to worsen, with debris falling from above and calls for help increasing, therefore necessitating the level 5 alarm to bring in more firefighters. Many residents remained trapped in their apartment units; however, the firefighters could not enter the buildings due to intense heat. Authorities instructed these trapped residents to shelter in place, and to seal window gaps and doors as the firefighters continued to try accessing the buildings to rescue them. Firefighters deployed seven ladders to douse the exterior of each burning building with water. At the same time, firefighters accessed the unaffected eighth building to activate the rooftop fire protection system to prevent a further fire spread and to fight the fire on the neighbouring building. Throughout the night, explosions were heard from various apartment units in the burning buildings.

A small wildfire also broke out at 22:13 across the Tai Po River from the apartment complex, close to Wong Shiu Chi Secondary School; it was mostly extinguished by 23:00.

=== Under control ===
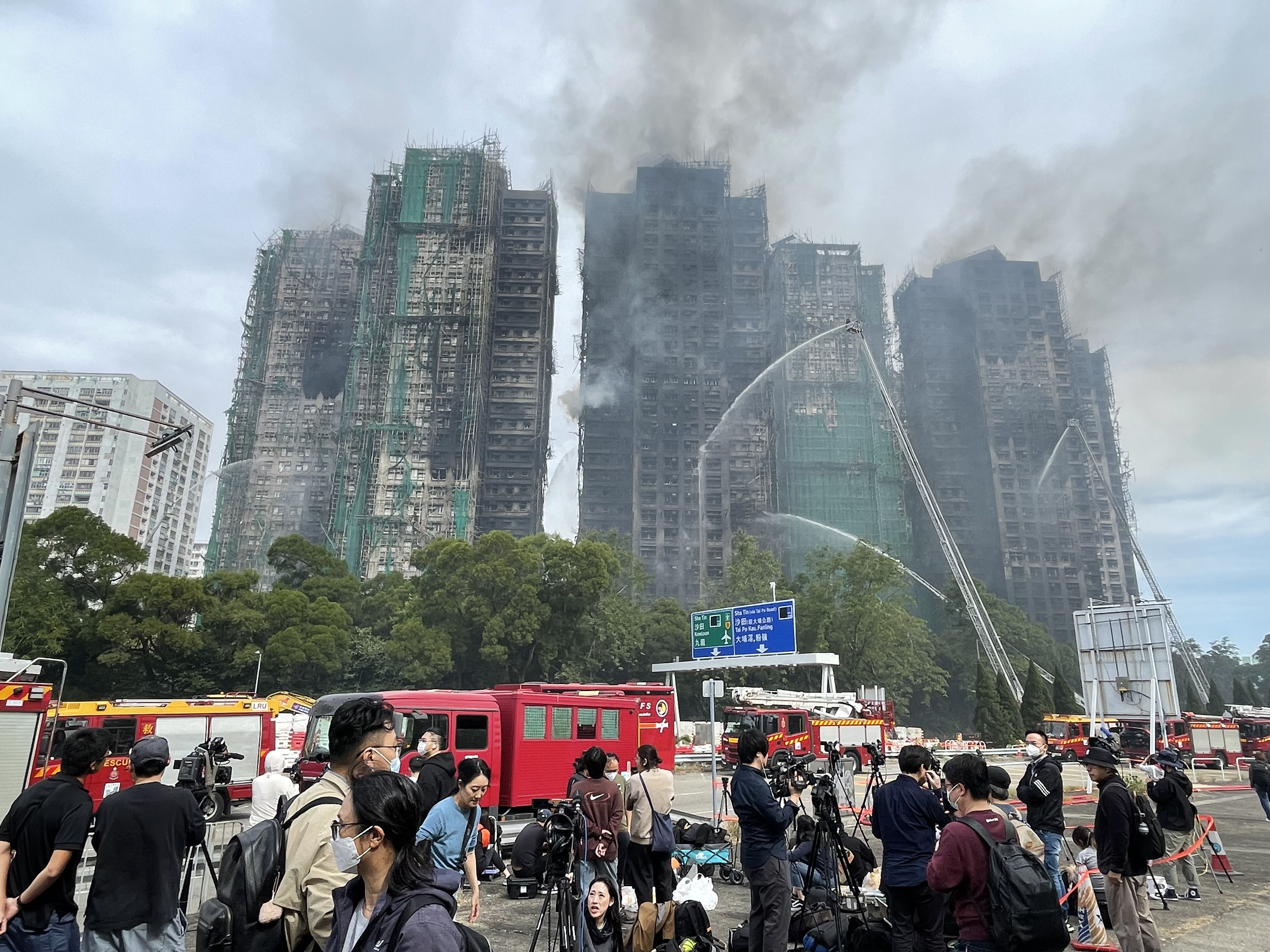
Firefighting efforts in the afternoon of 27 November. Seven ladders were deployed to douse the exteriors of the buildings.

At 01:50 on 27 November, the fire was being brought under control, with open flames on three buildings extinguished and embers remaining in some areas. At 05:45, firefighting operations were carried out between the fifth and eighteenth floors, while rescue operations were being extended upwards to between the thirteenth and twenty-third floors. Later that day, the city's fire department said that the combination of high temperatures (even after the fire had been put out), the risk of further scaffolding collapse, and the limited room in the small apartments had made rescue operations difficult. The fire in the fourth building was brought under control at 06:23, and search and rescue efforts began at the lower floors. By 09:00, three of the seven buildings were still on fire. By 15:10, the fire department had deployed 304 fire and rescue vehicles and dispatched 1,250 firefighters. They received 341 calls for help and successfully responded to 279 calls. Among the four buildings that were under control, there were no more calls for help. Operations by then involved re-ignition prevention measures, which included reducing the temperatures outside the buildings that were still on fire and the deployment of four drones to patrol the area.

At 23:15, the fire within Wang Cheong House (Block F) reignited, while two other buildings, Wang Tao House (Block B) and Wang Yan House (Block A), continued to have embers burning. At 01:20 on 28 November, the fire department reported that other than four apartment units that still had fire burning, the firefighting operation for the complex was largely completed. All apartment units within the seven buildings were forcibly accessed to ensure that no one was trapped in the complex. A fire reignited from within an apartment unit at 05:45 and was put out at 07:30.

At 10:18, the fire department announced that the fire was mostly put out after 43 hours of firefighting operations. Up to 2,311 firefighters were involved throughout the effort, with peak temperatures at the site estimated at 500 °C (932 °F).

== Victims ==
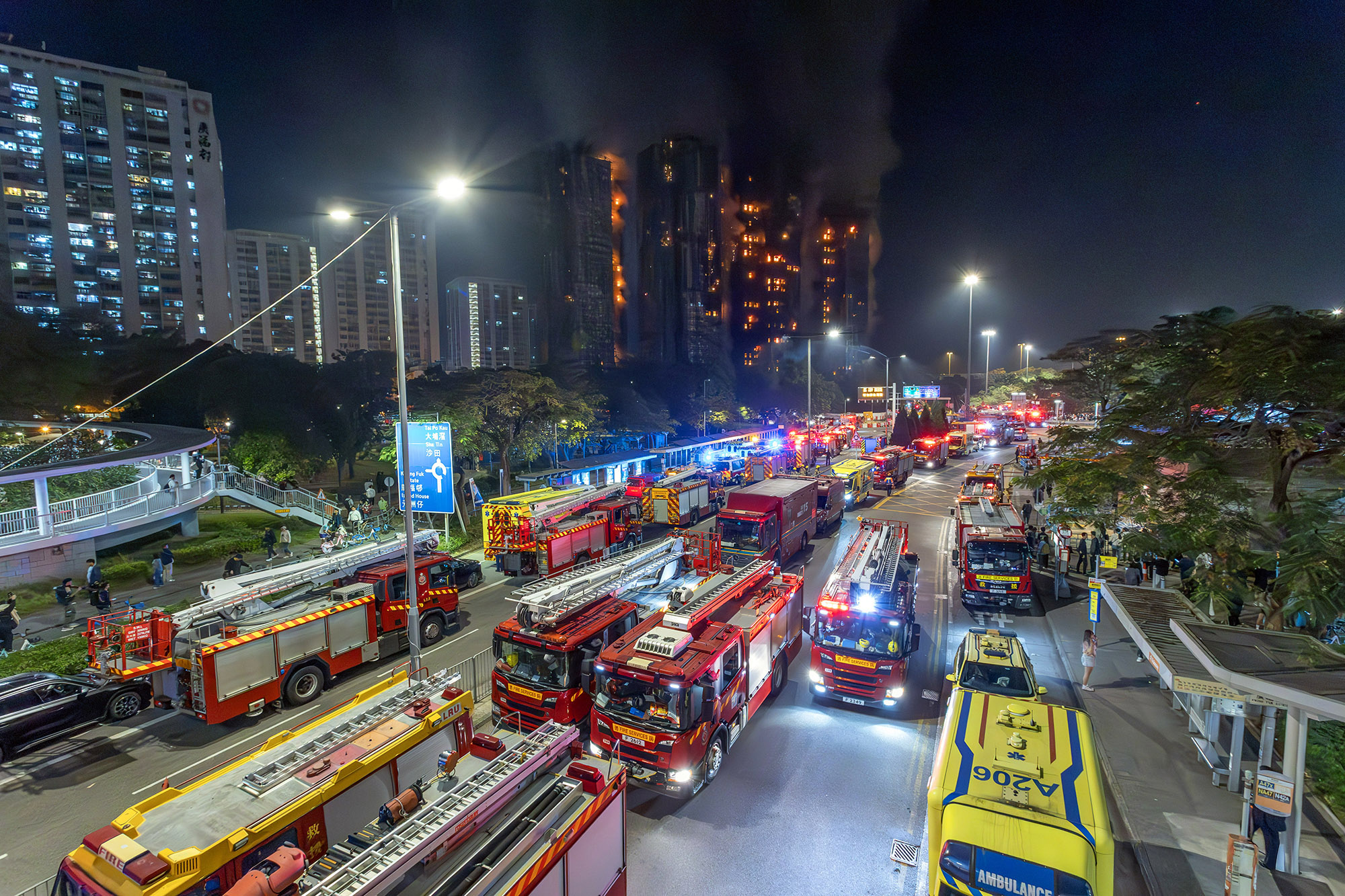
Emergency vehicles at Tai Po Road, with fire raging in Wang Fuk Court and blocks nearest to Kwong Fuk Estate evacuated

The Wang Fuk Court fire was the first five-alarm fire in Hong Kong since the 2008 Cornwall Court fire, and the deadliest fire in Hong Kong since the 1948 Wing On warehouse fire in Shek Tong Tsui in which 176 people died.

Around 56 people were rescued from the fire. 168 people were confirmed to have been killed while 79 others were injured. The 160th and 161st death were confirmed in mid and late December after discovering traces of their DNA in other bodies; they were an overseas helper and one of the couple. Over 40 were in critical condition initially; by 5 December, none remained in critical condition, and by 13 February 2026, only one victim remained in hospital. Of the fatalities, 147 were declared dead on scene while four others died in hospital. The victims' ages ranged from 6 months to 98 years old. Bodies were found inside apartments as well as in public areas, including stairwells and corridors.

Twelve firefighters were injured responding to the incident, and one was killed. The casualty was identified as 37-year-old Ho Wai-ho, a 9-year veteran of the Hong Kong Fire Services Department (FSD) based in Sha Tin Fire Station. He arrived at the scene shortly after the fire began and lost contact with his colleagues around 30 minutes later; his body was discovered with burn injuries to his face. The special independent committee determined that the most likely scenario for his death was a fall from the 31st floor.

There were 235 overseas workers from the Philippines and Indonesia assigned to services for residents in Wang Fuk Court. At least one Filipino and nine Indonesians were killed; three were injured. Five construction workers were also killed, after they failed to put out the fire and were forced to retreat indoors.

Interactive Map Red: Wang Cheung House (Block F), ignition point. Orange: Wang Tao House, Wang Sun House, Wang Tai House, and Wang Shing House (Blocks B, C, E, and G respectively), affected buildings where fatalities were located. Yellow: Wang Yan House (Block A) and Wang Kin House (Block D), affected buildings without fatalities. Grey: Wang Chi House (Block H), sole building unaffected by fire.

Location of fatalities found
Block			Deaths	Remarks
A	宏仁閣	Wang Yan House	0	
B	宏道閣	Wang Tao House	2	
C	宏新閣	Wang Sun House	2	
D	宏建閣	Wang Kin House	0	
E	宏泰閣	Wang Tai House	82	Second block ablaze
F	宏昌閣	Wang Cheong House	81	Point of origin
G	宏盛閣	Wang Shing House	1	
H	宏志閣	Wang Chi House	0	Building unaffected by fire

=== Missing people and identification of bodies ===
Chief Executive of Hong Kong John Lee reported on 26 November that at least 279 people were missing. Two days later the police said they received 467 missing persons reports, some of them duplicates. Of those missing, 39 were found dead and 35 required hospitalisation. A further 110 people were confirmed to be safe, and the condition of about 200 people remained unknown, including 89 whose bodies could not be identified.

After the rescue operations ended on 28 November, the Disaster Victims Identification Unit deployed 600 members to the scene to search for, recover, and identify any bodies within the burned buildings. Among the missing and unidentified bodies found, the 37 dead were previously reported missing, and 54 dead remained unidentified. There were still 150 missing persons. On 1 December, it was reported that over 30 people remain unaccounted for, with 100 missing person cases classified as "untraceable" due to insufficient information. However, 159 people were confirmed to be safe, with 54 bodies still requiring identification. Some bodies were burnt to ashes, hence some missing persons may not be identified. The search for bodies inside the seven affected buildings concluded on 3 December. As of 3 December 19 bodies still required identification, and 31 persons remained unaccounted for. All missing reports were resolved by 20 December, including 14 that were killed in the fire, 5 died before the blaze, and 12 confirmed safe.

=== Animals ===
According to the Society for the Prevention of Cruelty to Animals (SPCA), over 500 animals were trapped in the buildings during the fire. The organisation said that they would stay on site to triage, provide treatment, and work to rescue (or recover) any animals remaining. As of 3 December 2025, 294 animals were rescued from the site, including fish, cats, dogs, and turtles, among other species, while 70 were killed. Police officers deployed to search for remains found and rescued three cats and a turtle.

== Recovery and relief ==
=== Initial public response ===
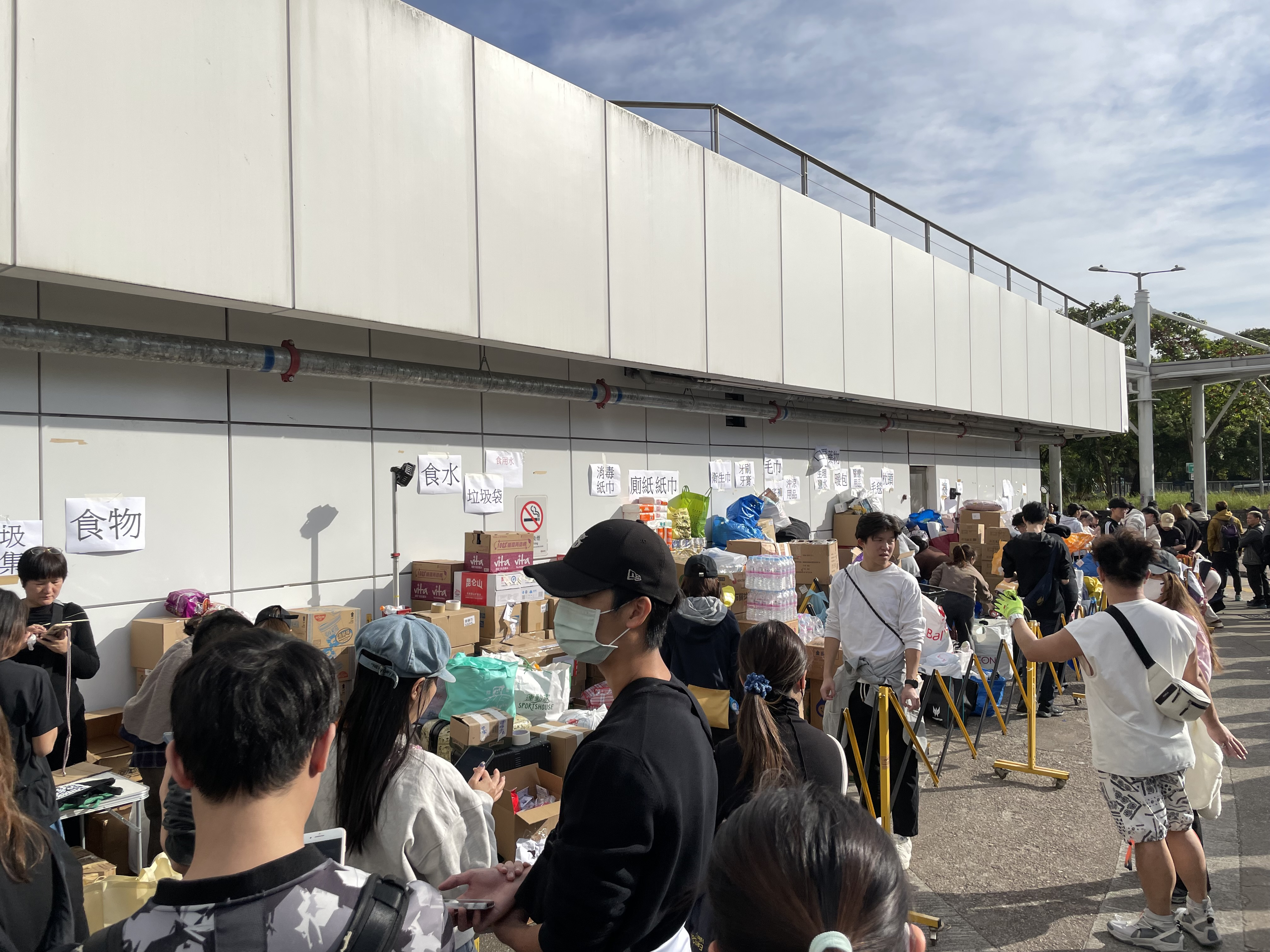
Donation centre set up outside Tai Po Market station

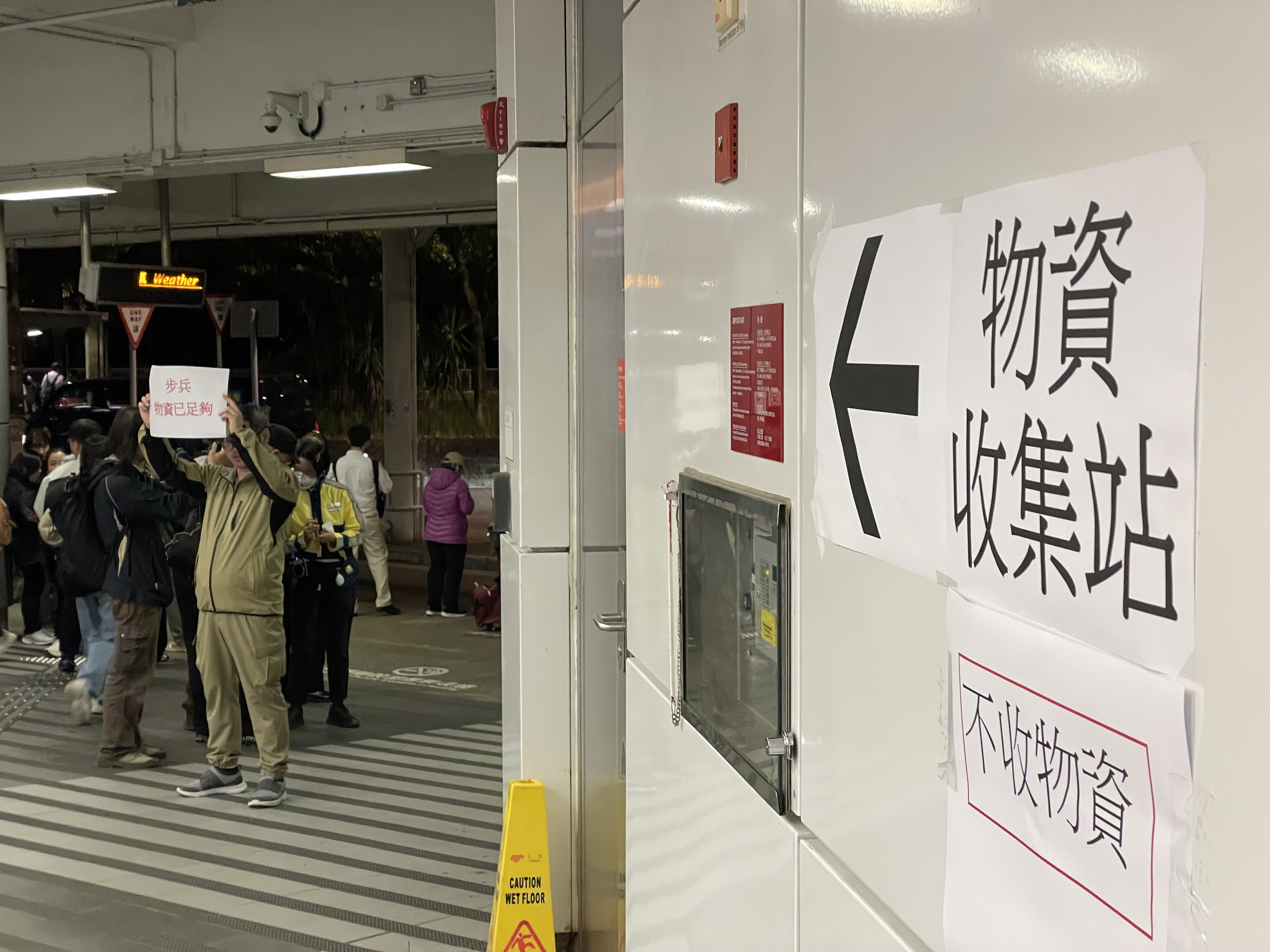
Volunteer at a collection centre holding up a sign stating that it has sufficient donated resources

Soon after the fire, several online communities in Tai Po mobilised to assist the affected residents and ask for the public to donate aids. Over 1,000 residents were evacuated to the nearby Kwong Fuk Shopping Centre. Shops, restaurants, and churches in the district opened as temporary rest areas, providing free food and assisting in the collection and distribution of donated materials. Residents were later evacuated into temporary shelters set up in nearby community halls, centres, and schools. Many volunteered to help sort and distribute food and daily necessities and drove overnight to deliver supplies to various locations. A website was set up to allow residents to report their safety and to post information on missing persons.

Several businesses provided assistance. The nearby Tai Po Mega Mall opened its shopping area overnight, providing drinking water, dry food, and free charging services. MTR Corporation opened the Tai Po Market station concourse for the victims to replace their damaged Octopus cards. Major telecommunications companies, including 3HK and CSL Mobile, provided free mobile data, external chargers, and extended store hours. ChargeSpot, a rental portable charger company, offered 160 hours of free charger rentals in the Tai Po area. McDonald's announced that it would provide free food to affected residents at three of the chain's 24-hour locations in the immediate aftermath of the blaze, and sent 1,000 breakfast meals to multiple evacuation centres on the morning of 27 November.

The Hong Kong Gold Coast Hotel, Royal Pacific Hotel, and Fullerton Ocean Park Hotel provided a total of 160 rooms for affected residents to stay free of charge. Regal Hotels International made 160 rooms at twelve of the group's hotels freely available to victims for two weeks, with free meals included. The president of Dorsett Hospitality International took charge of the logistics for Runway 1331, a youth hostel at the defunct Kai Tak Airport, to accommodate up to 2,000 residents. She previously had experience accommodating residents displaced by the 2017 Grenfell Tower fire.

Many Hong Kong artists personally delivered and distributed supplies. In addition, several animal welfare organisations also provided temporary care services and support for affected pets.

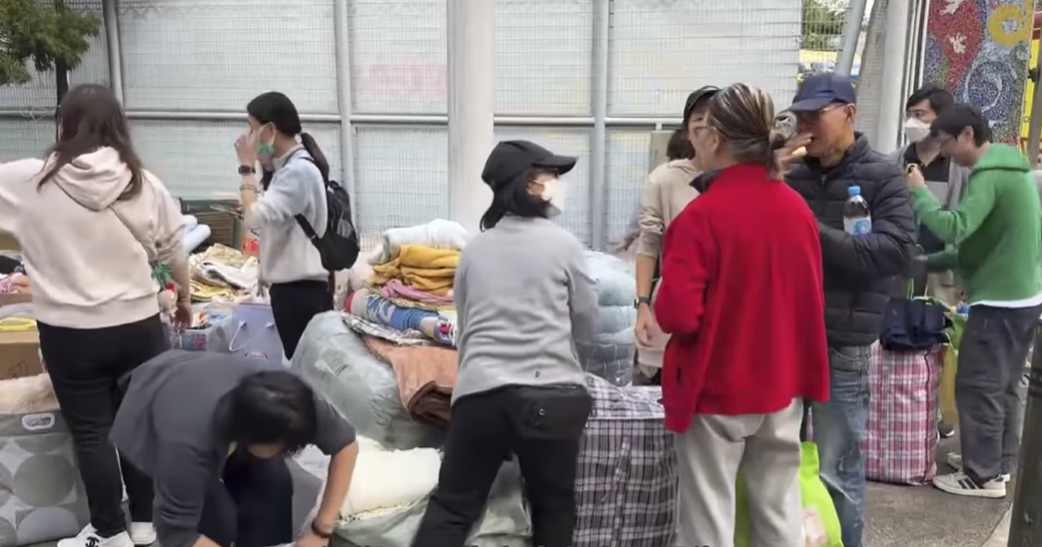
Donated items for the residents delivered by the public to a nearby school

=== Government ===
Chief Executive John Lee activated the Emergency Monitoring and Support Centre, and chaired an emergency interdepartmental meeting. The authorities convened three working groups with each focusing on investigations and regulations, emergency support and fundraising, and emergency accommodations arrangements.

The Tai Po District Office arranged for the affected residents to be evacuated into temporary shelters nearby, including community hall and school premises The government also set up a help desk at the Alice Ho Miu Ling Nethersole Hospital to assist affected residents with their questions, and to handle public inquiries. The police set up a registration table at Fung Leung Kit Memorial Secondary School for residents to register information about relatives with whom they had lost contact, and also established an injured inquiry hotline for citizens to search for relatives suspected to be injured or missing. It also established a temporary no-fly zone above the blaze to prohibit drones from interfering with rescue efforts.

The Housing Authority announced that it had coordinated housing resources for residents affected by the fire, including over 2,000 temporary housing units and temporary shelters and beds; over 1,400 transitional housing units were also available. Meanwhile, the Home and Youth Affairs Bureau found about 1,000 housing units that can be used as temporary accommodations for the victims for a week or two. The subsequent housing units would be mainly provided by the government, alongside transitional housing arrangements, and the Housing Society's dedicated resettlement housing arrangement, with a total of 1,800 units available initially. Those who lost their homes to the fire were subsequently moved to temporary housing found in youth hostels, hotels, and transitional flats. Each affected household was also assigned a dedicated social worker to assist during the recovery period. Affected residents were also being transported to various government offices to process their identity documents, certificates, and travel documents. Secretary for Housing Winnie Ho said on 30 November that about 1,500 residents had been relocated to hotels, hostels, and transitional housing, and 40 residents stayed in temporary shelters in Tai Po.

The Education Bureau announced that 13 schools would suspend classes for a day on 27 November to ease potential traffic congestion in the area for the firefighting operation, five of which continued to suspend classes on 28 November. Other schools issued notices allowing flexibility of their students' attendance if they were affected by the fire. The Education University of Hong Kong switched to virtual classes to ease traffic congestion in the area.

The government established a support fund on 27 November to provide financial assistance to the victims, with each affected family receiving HK$10,000 (US$1,287) in emergency relief funds. The public were able to contribute directly to this fund. The relief fund reached over HK$1.2 billion (US$154.44 million), comprising HK$900 million (US$115.83 million) in public donations and HK$300 million (US$38.61 million) in government grants. 1,420 of 1,900 registered households received the relief payment by 30 November. Additional compensation included HK$200,000 per deceased victim for family members, HK$50,000 for funeral expenses and related costs, a HK$50,000 living allowance beginning in early December, and columbarium fees being waived for deceased residents. In addition, the Social Welfare Department distributed Octopus cards with $2,000 of stored credit, with each resident receiving one card to cover their daily travel expenses.

=== Welfare organisations ===
Social welfare organisations in the Tai Po district opened their service points for immediate refuge. Immaculate Heart of Mary Church announced on their Facebook page that they would open their church for prayers and rest. The Hong Kong Federation of Women's Centres, Hong Kong Children & Youth Services, The Hong Kong Chinese Church of Christ and the Alliance World Fellowship also opened their churches and service centres. The Salvation Army and Rhenish Missionary Society opened their service centres providing mental support services. The Hong Kong Red Cross staffed six temporary shelters, and established a mental support hotline. The Chinese YMCA of Hong Kong said it would open 900 free temporary accommodations for citizens in need at the Wu Kwai Sha Youth Village. The non-profit Hong Kong Jockey Club opened several front-line shelters staffed with social workers. The Hong Kong Sheng Kung Hui Yuen Chen Maun Chen Primary School was opened for affected residents to rest and for refreshments.

Various fundraisers were also launched by a number of non-profits such as Habitat for Humanity, Hong Kong Sheung Kung Hui Welfare Council, and Feeding Hong Kong. Such organisations also appealed for direct resource donations such as food and necessities. The Law Society of Hong Kong established a hotline providing up to 45 minutes of free legal advice to those affected in the fire.

=== Donations ===
Xiaomi pledged a HK$10 million (US$1.29 million) donation through its foundation to provide medical assistance, emergency resettlement, and transitional living assistance for affected residents. Henderson Land donated HK$30 million (US$3.86 million) towards transitional living arrangements and emergency relief, while the Chow Tai Fook Group announced that it was donating HK$20 million (US$2.57 million) and would be offering temporary accommodation. Alibaba Group and Ant Group donated HK$20 million and HK$10 million, respectively. The Jack Ma Foundation also donated HK$30 million. Qiming Venture Partners donated HK$3 million. Cryptocurrency exchanges Bitget, Binance, Crypto, and KuCoin donated approximately HK$24.78 million (US$3.19 million); smaller exchanges also contributed. Animoca Brands began an omnibus fundraiser which enabled donations from the global crypto community to the Hong Kong Red Cross' Tai Po Fire Emergency Appeal. At the drive's end on 3 December 2025 approximately HK$869,067.7 (sic) had been raised, almost 33% of the total. The Hong Kong Jockey Club also donated HK$100 million (US$12.87 million) to "address the immediate needs of victims and the families of the deceased" and pledged more aid later on.

In South Korea, SM Entertainment pledged HK$1 million (US$128,700.13) to the Hong Kong Red Cross to aid firefighting, rescue and relief efforts, while music groups Aespa and Riize pledged HK$500,000 and HK$250,000 respectively. YG Entertainment also pledged HK$1 million to the fire victims. Stray Kids pledged HK$1 million through World Vision Hong Kong for temporary housing and other support for displaced residents and children. Likewise, JYP Entertainment and the MAMA Awards also pledged donations. The latter also revised the programme and performances at the lavish awards ceremony scheduled for the weekend of the 2025 edition that was held at the Kai Tak Stadium; the red carpet event ahead of the awards night was cancelled as a sign of respect for the victims. A moment of silence for the victims was held at the start and at the end of the ceremony.

== Reactions ==
=== Hong Kong ===
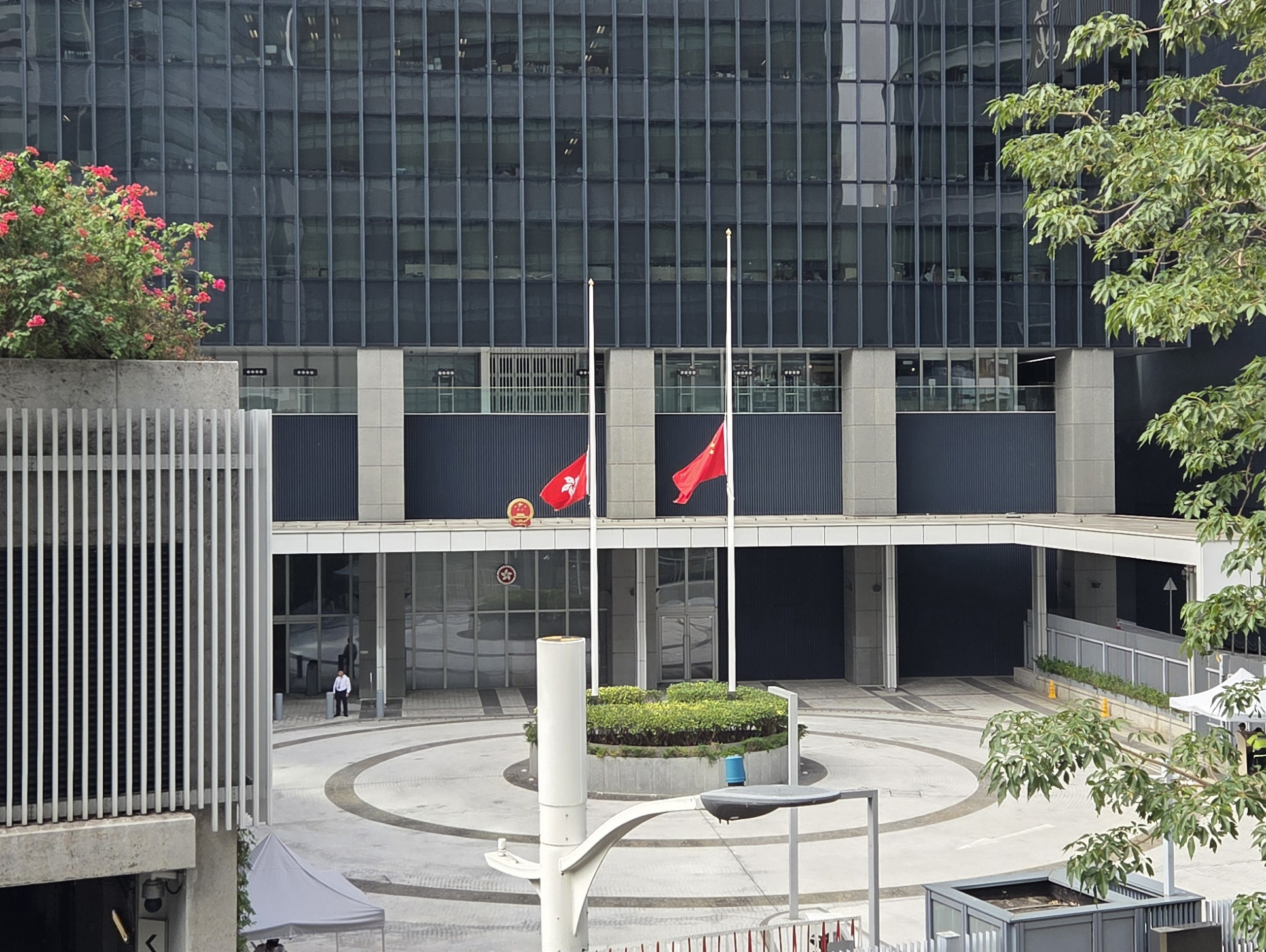
The Chinese national and Hong Kong flags at Central Government Complex flying at half-mast

Chief Executive John Lee, in an initial press conference in the early hours of 27 November, described the fire as a "major disaster" and expressed his sadness, deepest condolences and sympathies to the deceased and their families. He also thanked Xi Jinping, the General Secretary of the Chinese Communist Party, the Hong Kong and Macao Work Office (HMO), and the Hong Kong Liaison Office for their support. Various secretaries of the Executive Council of Hong Kong (ExCo) visited the affected residents and injured at the temporary shelters and hospitals. In response to the news of neighbouring Shenzhen's fire services gathering at Liantang Port, the land border checkpoint on Shenzhen's side of the Shenzhen–Hong Kong border, (Note: Shenzhen authorities later clarified that the gathering was part of a routine readiness drill exercise.) Lee expressed his thanks but also stated that Hong Kong's fire department had assessed that there were sufficient manpower to handle the fire. Lee faced backlash after he thanked Xi Jinping and other mainland support units before thanking the work of the firefighters, police officers, frontline staff, and medics.

Both the Chief Executive and Secretary for Security Chris Tang paid tribute to the firefighter, Ho Wai-ho, who died fighting the fire. Tang expressed "deep grief" and offered his "deepest condolences" to the firefighter's family. On 27 November, the Independent Commission Against Corruption (ICAC) mourned the victims of the fire and offered condolences to the families of the victims, the injured and the victims.

In response to the fire, the Constitutional and Mainland Affairs Bureau announced that the four forums for the legislative election scheduled for 27 and 28 November would be suspended. Forums were further suspended until 30 November, affecting eight such events in total.

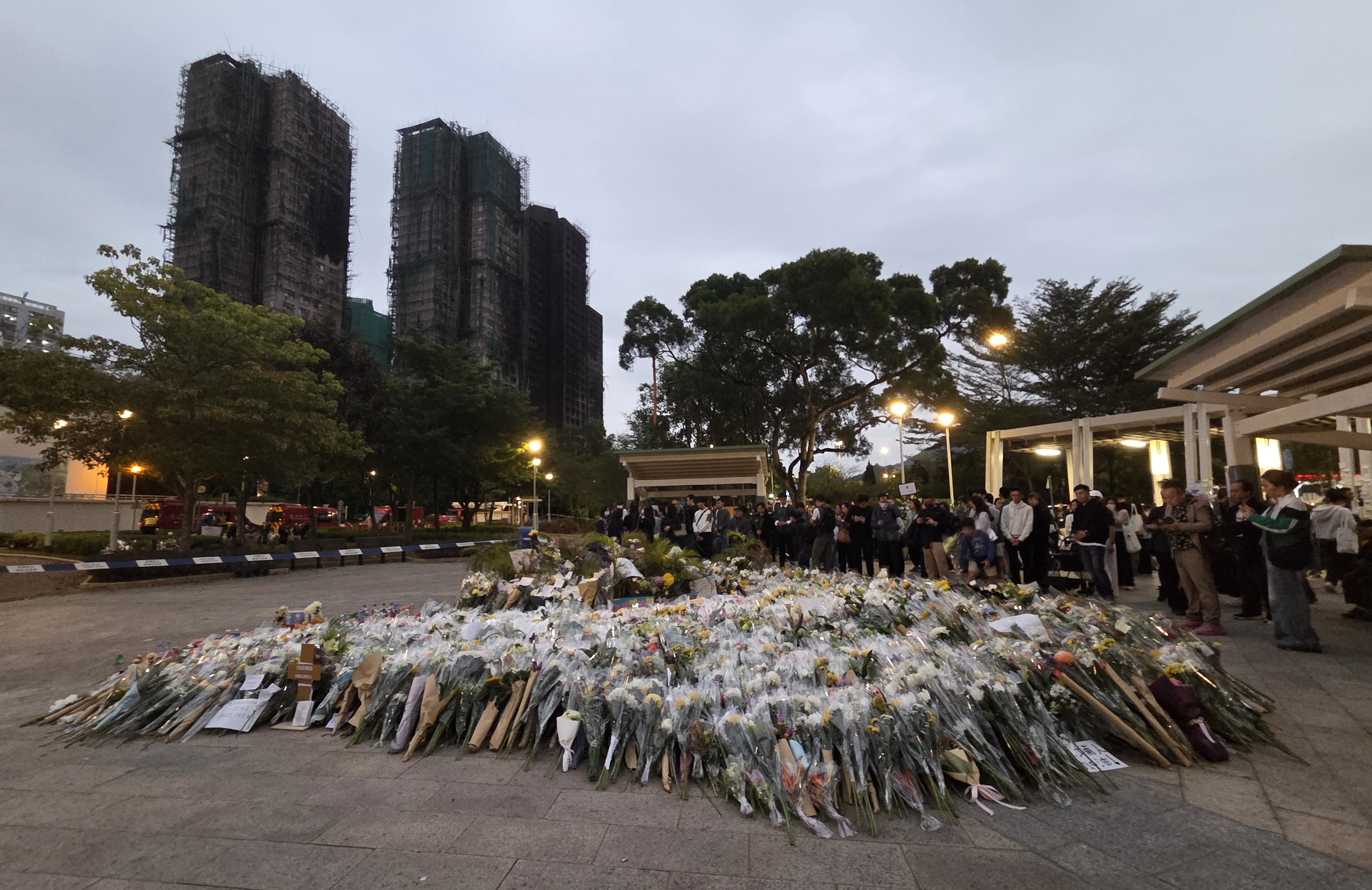
Flowers laid by the public near the complex

Condolence points for the public to sign condolence books were set up in all 18 districts of Hong Kong during the mourning period. Over the weekend, thousands queued and gathered at a fire cordon to lay flowers with handwritten notes of "Rest In Peace". In addition, many websites for organisations based in Hong Kong, including government websites, changed their entire website colour to greyscale to show sympathy and solidarity for the victims involved in the fire.

The public had questioned the lack of use of certain equipment during the firefighting operations, in particularly helicopter and drones for aerial firefighting as well as the short height of ladders used. In a press conference on 28 November, the authorities explained that helicopters were not utilised for firefighting as the water would only reach the exterior walls, potentially hampering operations targeting the fires within the building. The turbulent air flow generated would fan the fires further rather than contain them as well. It was observed that the ladders used were shorter than the height of the buildings. However, there was not enough firm ground around the base of the vehicle to extend the supporting legs for taller ladders. Drones were not used during the firefighting operations due to the smaller diameter of hoses that they use as compared to the fire trucks and hoses.

To mourn the victims of the fire, the national and the Hong Kong regional flags flown at government buildings were ordered to be set at half-mast from 29 November to 1 December, and a three-minute silence was held on 29 November at the Central Government Complex. During this period, ExCo members cancelled non-essential public events, while entertainment and celebrations organised and funded by the Hong Kong government were either cancelled or postponed. The daily A Symphony of Lights show was suspended on 27 November, and resumed on the evening of 10 December.

=== Mainland China ===
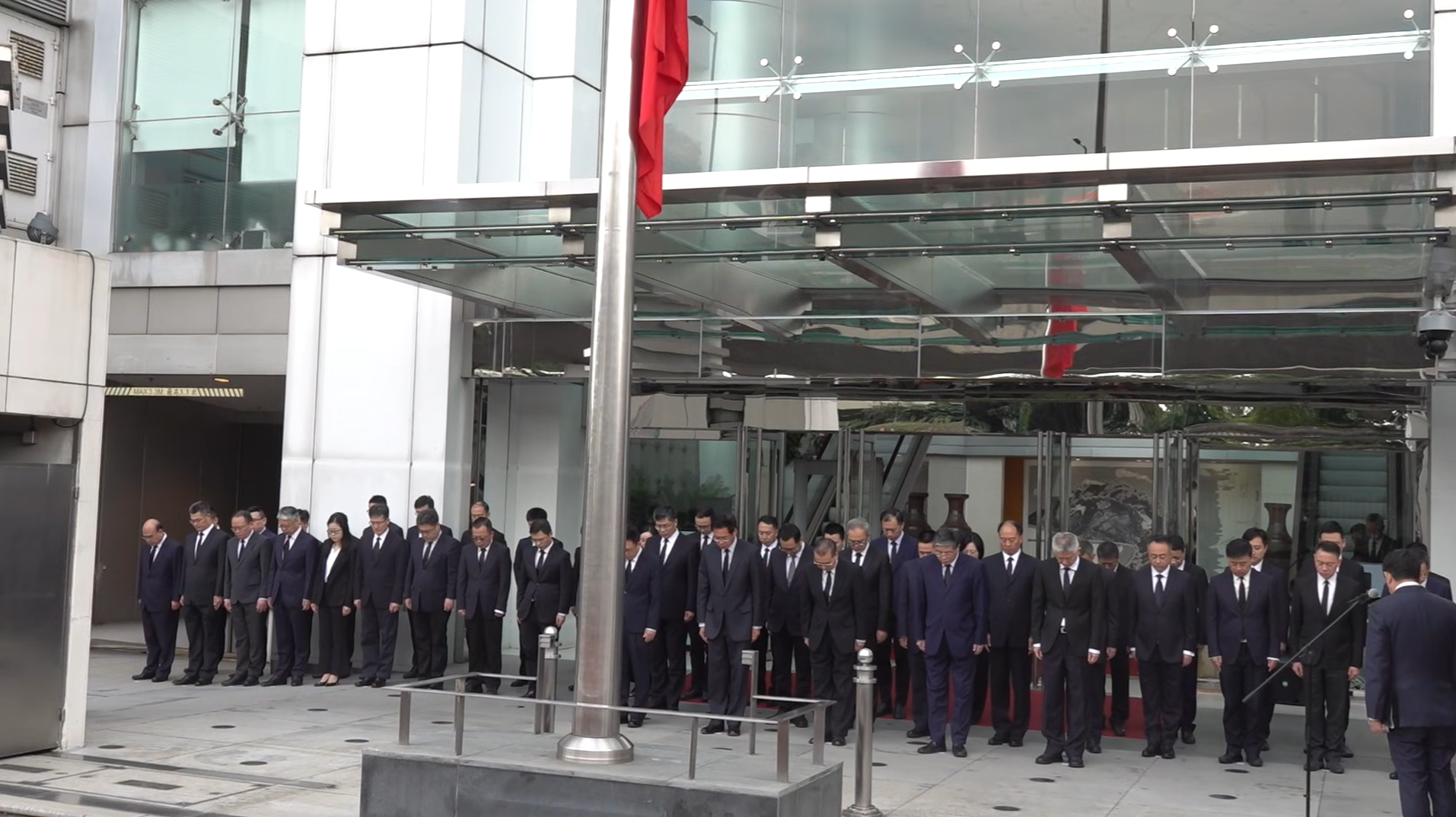
Mourning ceremony at Beijing's Hong Kong Liaison Office

The General Secretary of the Chinese Communist Party, Xi Jinping, expressed condolences to the victims of the deadly blaze and urged an "all-out effort" to extinguish the fire, and to minimise casualties and losses. Xi also requested the Hong Kong and Macao Work Office (HMO) and the Hong Kong Liaison Office to support the Hong Kong government in its efforts. Jiang Bin, the spokesperson for the Ministry of National Defense, stated that the Hong Kong Garrison would obey orders and perform its duties in accordance with the law when asked if the army units would provide assistance. On 27 November, the HMO announced that a working group was dispatched to Hong Kong to assist in the disaster relief work following the fire. The Guangdong and Shenzhen fire services lent drones and other equipment to help Hong Kong's fire department in their on-site investigations and emergency deployments.

China also launched a nationwide fire safety inspection on high-rise buildings, with additional attention being paid to buildings undergoing external wall renovations and interior modifications.

=== Macao ===
The Chief Executive of Macao, Sam Hou Fai, on behalf of the Government of Macao, expressed his condolences to the victims and their families and sympathies to John Lee, the injured and their families. He also personally donated HK$10 million (US$1.29 million) to support recovery efforts and stated that full assistance from Macao would be provided if required.

=== International reactions ===
As of 29 November 2025, at least 16 heads or leaders of state, and 52 countries' embassies and consulates have issued statements expressing condolences. Charles III, King of the United Kingdom and other Commonwealth realms, said he and Queen Camilla were "greatly saddened to learn of the devastating fire", and that they "feel deeply" for the people of Hong Kong. They also paid tribute to the extraordinary bravery shown by emergency workers and the compassion of neighbours helping one another. Pope Leo XIV expressed deep sorrow over the incident, and sent a telegram to the Bishop of Hong Kong, Stephen Chow offering condolences to the victims and prayers for the deceased and rescue workers. Australian Prime Minister Anthony Albanese stated that the fire was "a human tragedy", and added that "the hearts of all Australians today will be thinking of the people of Hong Kong who are going through a very tough day". British Foreign Secretary Yvette Cooper issued a statement, stating that the fire was "truly devastating and deeply distressing" and that the UK "sends heartfelt condolences" to the victims. Canadian Foreign Minister Anita Anand issued a statement that "Canada is deeply saddened" by the fire and sent wishes to injured victims and volunteer workers. Similar statements have been made by the Principal Deputy Spokesperson for the US Department of State Thomas Pigott, German Foreign Minister Johann Wadephul, Irish Foreign Minister Helen McEntee, South Korean Foreign Minister Cho Hyun, Japanese Prime Minister Sanae Takaichi, Singaporean Prime Minister Lawrence Wong, and Malaysian Prime Minister Anwar Ibrahim. Pakistani President Asif Ali Zardari, the Turkish government, Kazakh President Kassym-Jomart Tokayev, Russian President Vladimir Putin and Maldivian President Mohamed Muizzu sent messages of condolence to Xi Jinping. From Taiwan, President Lai Ching-te and Vice President Hsiao Bi-khim expressed their condolences. The Mainland Affairs Council also expressed condolences and sympathies for the fire accident.

Grenfell United, an activist group composed of the survivors of London's Grenfell Tower fire, also issued a statement, noting that their "hearts go out to all those affected by the horrific fire", and that they "stand with" the victims of the fire.

== Investigation ==
An inter-departmental Fire Investigation Task Force was established on 28 November, led by the Hong Kong Fire Services Department and comprising representatives from the Hong Kong Police Force, the Buildings Department, the Electrical and Mechanical Services Department, the Housing Bureau's Independent Checking Unit, the Labour Department, the Government Laboratory, and fire engineering professionals. The task force's two primary objectives are to investigate the cause and spread of the fire and to determine factors that contributed to the heavy casualty toll. It was estimated that it would take three to four weeks to collect evidence.

=== Police and anti-corruption authorities ===
In the early hours of 27 November, the Hong Kong Police Force arrested three men on the suspicion of manslaughter. The three arrested individuals included two company directors and one consultant from a construction firm, with operations spanning Tai Po, Ngau Tau Kok, and San Po Kong. The company, later confirmed to be Prestige Construction and Engineering Company, was searched by the police with several boxes of documentation taken as evidence. By 3 December, a total of 16 people had been arrested on charges relating to the fire, including six who were suspected of deactivating fire alarms during the renovation.

The Independent Commission Against Corruption (ICAC) also launched an investigation over possible corruption during the renovation works due to the "significant public interest" involved. On 28 November, the ICAC arrested eight people on the suspicion of corruption.

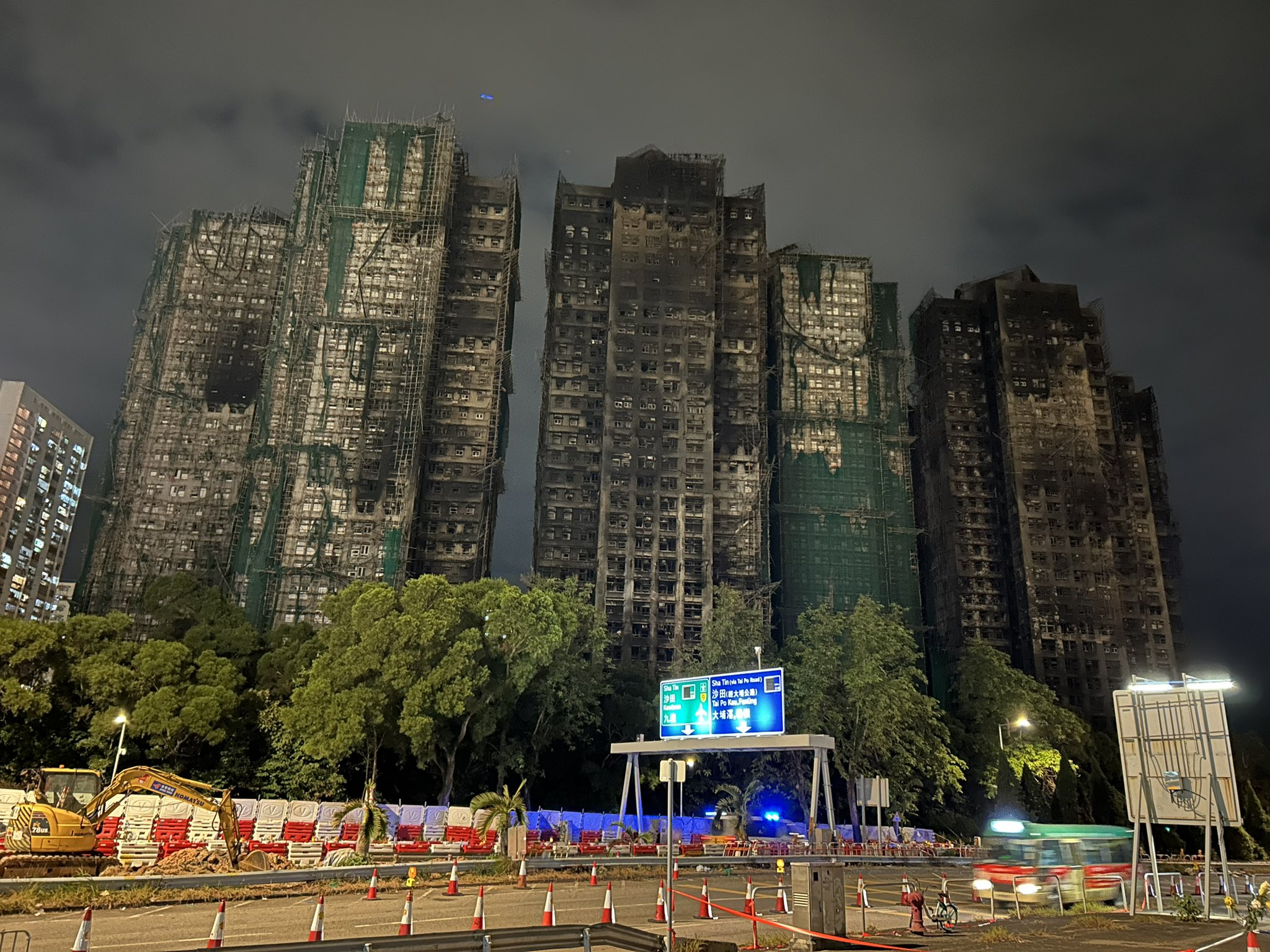
Remnants of the scaffolding at issue

Initial investigations revealed multiple potential fire safety violations at the estates:

- Expanded polystyrene boards were installed covering interior windows on each floor near lift lobbies and all exterior windows. These were confirmed to be highly flammable. The fire ignited at the Wang Cheong House and quickly spread to these boards causing windows to shatter and allow the fire to spread indoors and set items on fire.
- The construction safety netting and waterproof tarpaulins on the building's exterior were alleged to have not met the fire-resistance standards. However, preliminary investigation and test results indicated that the scaffolding and the netting used on the building met fire-retardant requirements. Despite this, at high temperature, the netting could still be set ablaze. Further testing on the netting was done as initial testing was not congruent with firefighters' observations, and the additional tests revealed seven of 20 samples did not pass fire safety tests. Some of the samples that failed were located at hard to reach areas, thereby hiding them from inspectors who did the regular inspections. To mislead inspectors, fire-resistant netting was only placed at the base of the scaffolding, where samples are usually taken.
- Investigations of the fire alarms in the eight buildings revealed that they were faulty. The systems were powered on but no alarms sounded.

Eileen Chung, a senior superintendent of the police, stated that they had reason to believe the contractor responsible had been "grossly negligent", which resulted in the incident and allowed the fire to spread uncontrollably, leading to significant casualties. The Secretary for Security, Chris Tang, commented that the rate at which the fire spread was "unusual" and that the blaze should not have spread through the buildings so rapidly if proper netting materials had been in place.

On 14 January 2026, during the opening of the 8th Legislative Council, Chief Executive John Lee Ka-chiu made an unprecedented appearance and promised to hold everyone responsible accountable. He announced that police had as of then arrested 22 people, with 16 being suspected of manslaughter, and the ICAC had arrested 14 on suspicion of corruption.

=== Independent Committee ===
On 2 December 2025, John Lee announced the establishment of an Independent Committee to review and examine the causes of the fire, the reasons for its rapid spread, and related issues. He also stated that the government would liaise with the judiciary and invite a judge to chair the committee and to study its detailed terms of reference. Unlike a "Commission of Inquiry", which is vested with statutory powers, an "Independent Committee" has no statutory authority. Its mode of operation is similar to the review committees set up after the 2003 Tuen Mun Road bus accident and the 2018 Tai Po Road bus accident. Judge David Lok was appointed to chair the committee, which held its first public meeting on 5 February 2026.

In March 2026, some residents testified that that DAB district councillor Peggy Wong may have been involved in securing "shady" proxy votes so that the construction firm would win the contract.

Closing submissions were heard on 17 July 2026.

The inquiry's final report, amounting to more than 1,000 pages, was released on 29 October 2026. It detailed wide-ranging governance and supervisory failings in Hong Kong's building-renovation system. During its release, Chief Executive John Lee ascribed the main responsibility over the fire to the Housing Bureau’s Independent Checking Unit (ICU), which was to be abolished and replaced with a new public housing control unit, and partial responsibility to the Buildings Department, the Fire Services Department and the Labour Department. He also issued an official apology and announced the resignation of Winnie Ho as Secretary for Housing.

== Aftermath ==
Multiple music events scheduled in Hong Kong for the weekend of 28 November were cancelled or postponed due to the fire, including concerts by Constance Chan, Shino Lin, and Ken Hung. Miriam Yeung's concert series, scheduled to begin on 29 November, was scaled down with all pyrotechnic effects removed. Yeung also pledged her first-night proceeds and all merchandise profits towards the disaster response. Disney cancelled the 27 November gala premiere for Zootopia 2 at Hong Kong Disneyland along with the theme park's nightly fireworks show.

Several sporting events were also cancelled, including the Oxfam Trailwalker, the Hong Kong Cyclothon and several matches by the Hong Kong China Rugby Union. The Hong Kong Jockey Club announced that the scheduled horse races on 30 November were to be held behind closed doors and all the gross incomes, which amounted to HK$70.2 million (US$9.03 million), were donated to the government support fund in addition to the HK$100 million (US$12.87 million) HKJC donated previously. The torch relay and opening ceremony for the 12th National Games for Persons with Disabilities of China, originally scheduled for 29 November and 8 December respectively, were cancelled, with a simplified closing event postponed to 15 December after the conclusion of all competitions.

=== Public petition and "national security" crackdowns ===
Miles Kwan, a 24-year-old Chinese University of Hong Kong (CUHK) student, launched a public petition, calling for an independent Commission of Inquiry into the fire, construction supervision review, government accountability, and support for affected residents. Kwan was arrested on 29 November by the National Security Department (NSD) on suspicion of seditious intent, and released after two nights on bail. Kwan's petition accumulated over 10,000 signatures before being deleted from social media. Another petition was launched by a Tai Po resident living overseas on the same platform after the original one was closed, with the same four demands. Kwan was expelled from CUHK in February 2026 after a disciplinary review, which had commenced after he had been released from bail; a letter from the university cited "multiple acts of misconduct" as reason. Subsequently, a petition calling for CUHK to reinstate Miles Kwan and acknowledge that a disciplinary hearing held on January 7 was invalid garnered over 1,000 signatures from students, staff, and alumni.

Several others have been arrested under the sedition offense in relation to the fire. Kenneth Cheung Kam-hung, a former Tuen Mun District Councillor, along with a volunteer who was helping outside the scene, were arrested on 30 November by national security police for "inciting discord through comments". A 26-year-old YouTuber, Kenny Chan, was arrested for acting with seditious intention after making 'depraved' comments about the fire and its victims.

Bruce Liu and Howard Lee, chair and vice-chair of the pro-democracy political party Association for Democracy and People's Livelihood, had to cancel a press conference scheduled to discuss high-rise building maintenance policy after they were brought away by NSD officers. It was also reported that commentators from both pro-Beijing and pro-democracy camps were approached by security police after making comments online on the fire.

Beijing's Office for Safeguarding National Security issued a statement warning against "anti-China and ill-intentioned individuals" attempting to exploit the tragedy to cause unrest and political instability. The office also summoned representatives and journalists from several foreign media outlets, including The New York Times, to warn them to avoid negative coverage of the Hong Kong government's response. What coverage prompted the warning was not specified. John Lee also criticised those "exploiting" the fire and "sabotaging" society's effort to support the victims, adding that the government would not tolerate such behaviours. Meanwhile, Amnesty International called on authorities to "transparently investigate the causes of the devastating fire... rather than silencing those who ask legitimate questions".

On 2 December, messages appeared on the notice-board of the Hong Kong Baptist University student union calling for the government to be receptive and respond to public demands for justice. The wall was later blocked off with barricades by university security personnel. The union was subsequently suspended by the university administration.

=== City-wide inspections and proposed regulations ===
On 27 November, the government announced that the Buildings Department and the Labour Department would inspect all housing estates undergoing "major repairs" and examine the scaffolding and building materials. The safety nets on the scaffolding were immediately removed from many residential buildings in several districts following the fire disaster. The mass removal raised questions by the public on the adequacy of the authorities' supervision, given that problematic construction material was not an isolated issue. By 28 November, authorities had inspected 127 buildings and collected samples of the nettings used for testing. They also found polystyrene foam boards on windows on several buildings and ordered their removal. The Labour Department also initiated a territory-wide special enforcement operation on 29 November to inspect fire protection facilities at building repair worksites featuring large bamboo scaffolding structures. By 30 November 46 sites had been inspected, resulting in 39 written warnings and two improvement notices being issued to contractors and site supervisors. The Buildings Department confirmed it had suspended work at 28 sites where Prestige was the registered contractor due to a lack of confidence in Prestige's ability to ensure safety. It also suspended work at two other sites after finding plastic sheets covering the windows.

Residents across the city were also increasingly concerned about their own building renovation works. Residents of the Sui Wo Court in Fo Tan conducted tests on their own initiative on their protective netting and other construction materials. Subsequently, the Sui Wo Court Owners' Incorporation and the maintenance contractor sent personnel to inspect the materials and held an emergency residents' meeting. The management of Elegance Gardens in Tuen Mun warned its residents against conducting their own tests and said their contractor, incidentally also Prestige Construction and Engineering Company, had submitted a flame retardant test report for the netting. A later test conducted by management found the materials to be vulnerable.

On 3 December, Secretary for Development Bernadette Linn announced that over 200 construction sites were ordered to remove existing scaffolding mesh within three days. The safety netting at over 300 buildings were inspected; samples were collected at different heights of the scaffolding. Authorities are investigating a Shandong-based company for presenting falsified safety documentations for its construction safety nettings, which were used at two locations in Hong Kong.

On 14 January 2026, Secretary for Labour and Welfare Chris Sun announced that the government would ban smoking at all construction sites in the city, instead of requiring fire risk assessments to issue bans. Sun also said that the materials in toe boards used on scaffolding, which was in this case possibly flammable, would also be regulated.

=== Residents and management of Wang Fuk Court ===
The Housing Bureau completed structural inspections of six of the eight residential blocks by 30 November, finding no immediate structural danger to the buildings overall. However, a small number of units in Wang Yan House and Wang Tao House required temporary structural reinforcement. A second phase of inspections involving concrete core sample extraction was planned to comprehensively assess internal structural damage caused by the extreme temperatures reached during the fire. On 3 and 4 December, residents of the unaffected Wang Chi House were allowed to return and retrieve personal items and valuables from 09:00 to 21:00.

On 19 December 2025, the government announced that it would apply to the Lands Tribunal to dissolve the existing management committee of the complex and replace it with a new provisional administrator, Chinachem Group's Hop On Management, to oversee the property to professionally manage the follow-up work required from the renovations, insurance claims, and estate's maintenance and security.

== See also ==
- List of building or structure fires
- List of fires in high-rise buildings
