= Cornwall Court fire =

2008 building fire incident in Hong Kong

Coordinates: 22.3197°N 114.1688°E

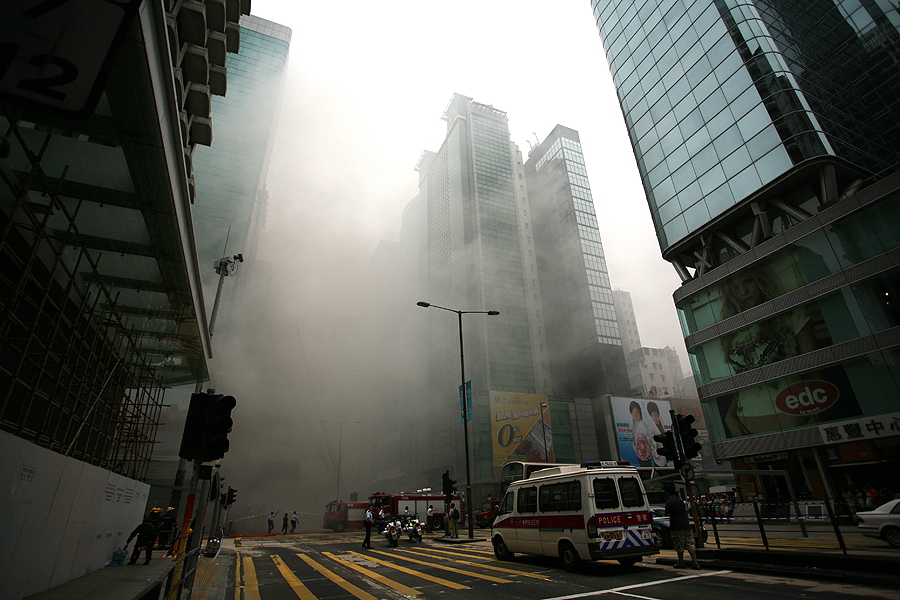
- Heavy smoke choked the Nathan Road (the near side, to the left is HSBC Mong Kok Branch Office and right Wai Fung Plaza)
- Date: 10 August 2008; 17 years ago
- Time: 09:20
- Location: Mong Kok, Hong Kong
- Deaths: 4
- Injuries: 55

The Cornwall Court Fire (Chinese: 嘉禾大廈五級火) was a building fire incident in Hong Kong. It began in a nightclub and karaoke bar on the morning of 10 August 2008, killing four people, including two firefighters, and injuring a further 55 people.

== Incident ==
The fire broke out at 09:20, in the nightclub on the mezzanine floor, and quickly engulfed the entire building, according to a preliminary investigation by firefighters. It was upgraded to a No. 4 alarm at 10:23 and a No. 5 at 12:16. More than 200 firefighters and 40 apparatuses from across Kowloon were dispatched to deal with the blaze. Many trapped residents were rescued. Cornwall Court is a 15-storey building on Nathan Road in Mong Kok, built in 1962. Its lower floors were occupied by a nightclub and shops while the upper floors were residential. The fire caused the complete closure of Nathan Road and the evacuation of residents from nearby buildings.

== Victims ==
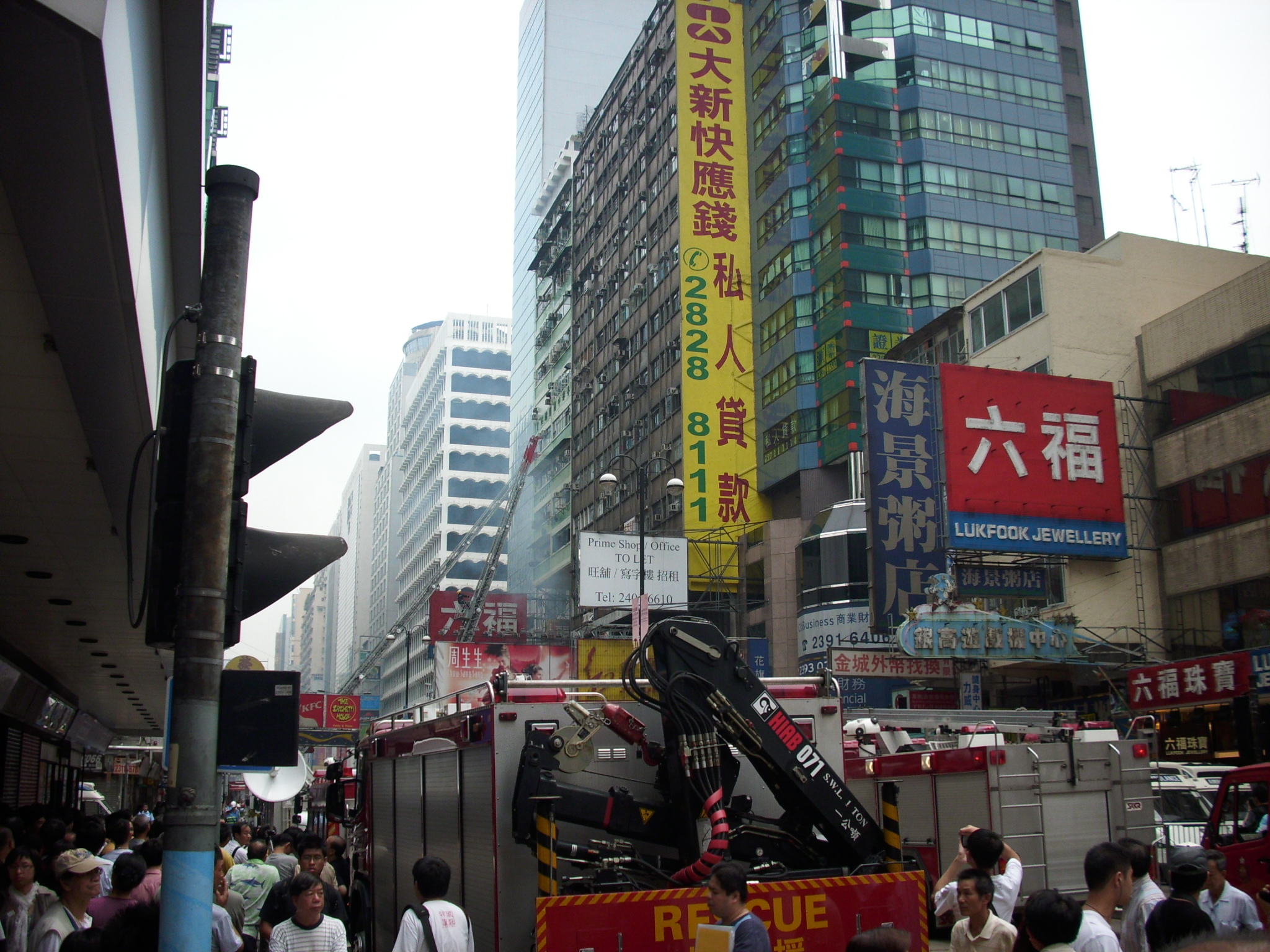
View of fire scene from Nathan Road

Two firefighters from Mong Kok Fire Station, Senior Fireman Siu Wing-fong, 46 years old with 24 years' experience, and Fireman Chan Siu-lung, 25 years old with one year of service, died from smoke inhalation on the top floor of the building while trying to reach trapped residents. Survivors reported that the two officers had given them their oxygen breathing apparatus even while continuing to carry the heavy cylinders.

One of the two civilian victims was a 77-year-old woman, on the ninth floor, and the other was a female staff member at the nightclub, surnamed Man and aged 39, who had been asleep with colleagues. Her burned body was found in the nightclub after the fire was extinguished.

== Aftermath ==
The fire was extinguished at 15:13, but the building remained closed pending an investigation into the cause of the fire. Residents were provided with temporary shelter in Mong Kok Community Centre, although some refused to leave their homes.

The southbound side of Nathan Road was reopened by evening, the pedestrian walk outside Cornwall Court was blocked till 12 August.

== See also ==
- Garley Building Fire
- Wang Fuk Court fire
