= List of demolished piers in Hong Kong =

The following is an incomplete list of demolished piers in Hong Kong.

Name	Year completed	Year demolished	Location	Details	Image
Blake Pier (first generation)	1900	1965	Central		
Blake Pier (second generation)	1965	1993	Central		
Chai Wan Ferry Pier	1965	1986	Chai Wan		
City Hall Ferry Pier		2006	Central		
Edinburgh Place Ferry Pier	1957	2006	Central		
Jordan Road Ferry Pier	1924	1998	Jordan		
Mei Foo Ferry Pier	1974	1984	Mei Foo		
Mong Kok Ferry Pier	1924	1972	Mong Kok		
Ngau Tau Kok Ferry Pier	1953	1960s	Ngau Tau Kok		
Queen's Pier (first generation)	1924	1955	Central		
Queen's Pier (second generation)	1954	2008	Central		
Sham Shui Po Ferry Pier	1924	1992	Sham Shui Po		
Tai Kok Tsui Ferry Pier	1972	1992	Tai Kok Tsui		
Tai Koo Shing Ferry Pier	1980	1983	Tai Koo		
Tai Po Kau Pier (former)		1983			
Tsim Sha Tsui East Ferry Pier	1986	2008	Tsim Sha Tsui East		
United Pier	1933	1994	Central		
Wan Chai Ferry Pier		2014	Wan Chai		
Wilmer Street Ferry Pier	1931	1979	On Connaught Road West, east of the junction with Wilmer Street in Sheung Wan 22.28846°N 114.14498°E	The pier provided services to Sham Shui Po and from 1950 onwards also to Aberdeen, Cheung Chau and Tai O. It was constructed from reinforced concrete extending about 80 feet seaward from the shore. The space between pier and sea wall was spanned by a steel bridge. On the bridge ferry offices and a covered waiting area for passengers were built. The pier opened at the end of 1931. The Hong Kong and Yaumati Ferry Company (HYF) used the pier for the service to the Sham Shui Po Ferry Pier. After the war, the ferry service between Sheung Wan and Sham Shui Po was resumed in 1950. In 1951, additional ferry services to Aberdeen, Hong Kong — Cheung Chau and Aberdeen — Tai O started. The pier was severely damaged by Typhoon Hope in August 1979 and it was decided that expensive repairs should not be undertaken, since the Western reclamation works had started already. The Wilmer Street/Sham Shui Po service was cancelled and the pier was removed in 1981.	
Yaumatei Ferry Pier	1924	1933	Yau Ma Tei		
