= United Pier =

Ferry pier in Hong Kong

Coordinates: 22.2848°N 114.1566°E

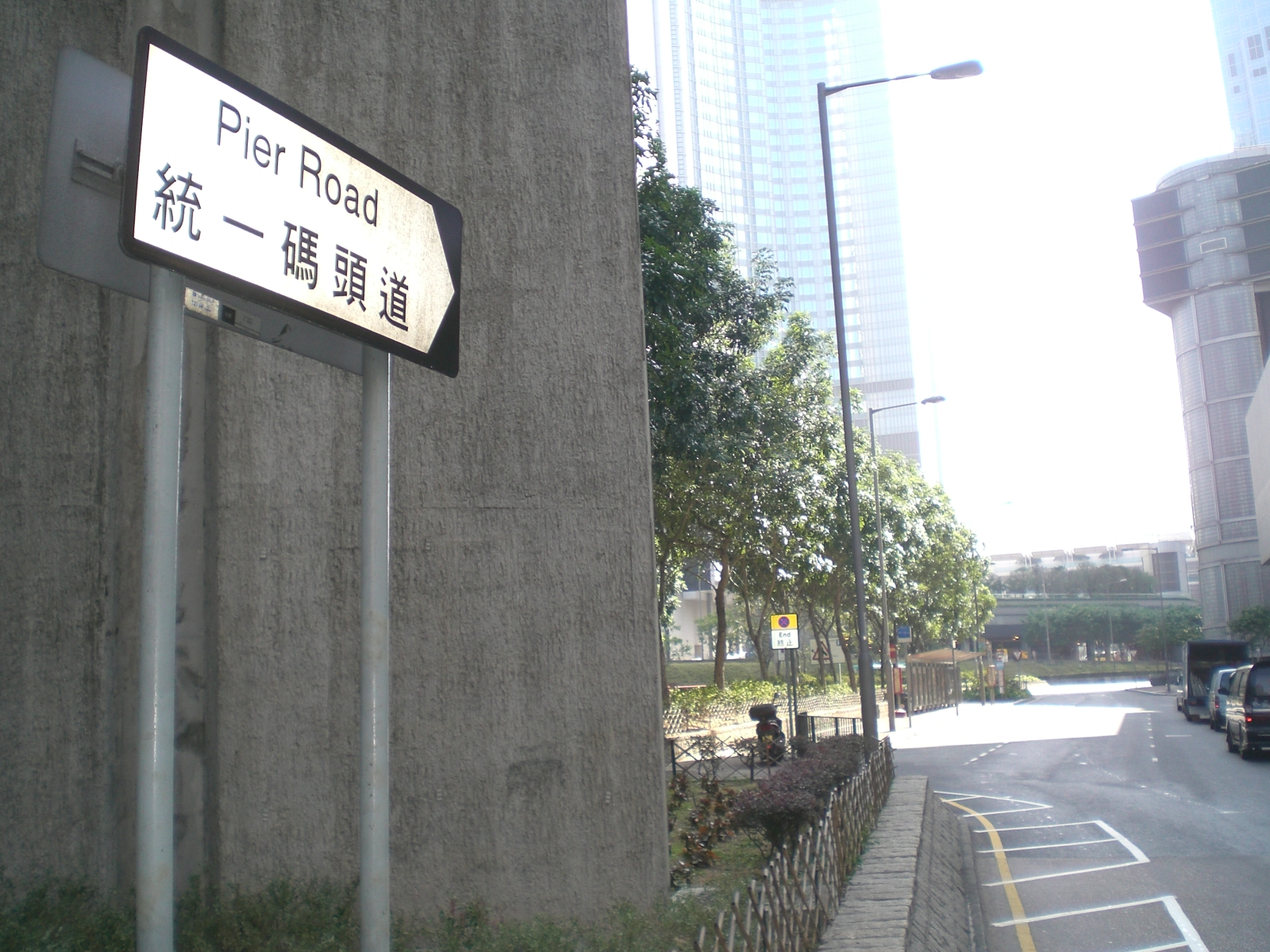
Pier Road (Central) today, but United Pier does not exist any more

United Pier (Chinese: 統一碼頭) (1933–1994) was a ferry pier in Central, Hong Kong. It was located at Jubilee Street, so it was formerly named "Jubilee Street Pier" (租卑利街碼頭).

== History ==
The pier opened in 1933, providing berths for the ferries to Jordan Road, Mong Kok, Sham Shui Po, Cheung Chau and Silvermine Bay, and vehicular ferries to Yau Ma Tei. It was demolished in 1994 to make way for the Central and Wan Chai Reclamation. The MTR Airport Express Hong Kong station and Four Seasons Hotel were then built on the reclaimed land.

== See also ==
- List of demolished piers in Hong Kong
