= Jubilee Street =

Jubilee Street may refer to:

== Places ==
- Jubilee Street, Whitechapel, London - notable site of anarchist club pre-WWI
  - Jubilee Street Club
- Jubilee Street, Hong Kong
- Jubilee Street Pier (Chinese: 租卑利街碼頭) old name for the United Pier, demolished in 1994 due to harbour infill

== Music ==
- Jubilee Street (song) by Nick Cave
