= Man Wah Sun Chuen =

Housing estate in Yau Ma Tei, Hong Kong

Coordinates: 22.307529°N 114.166262°E

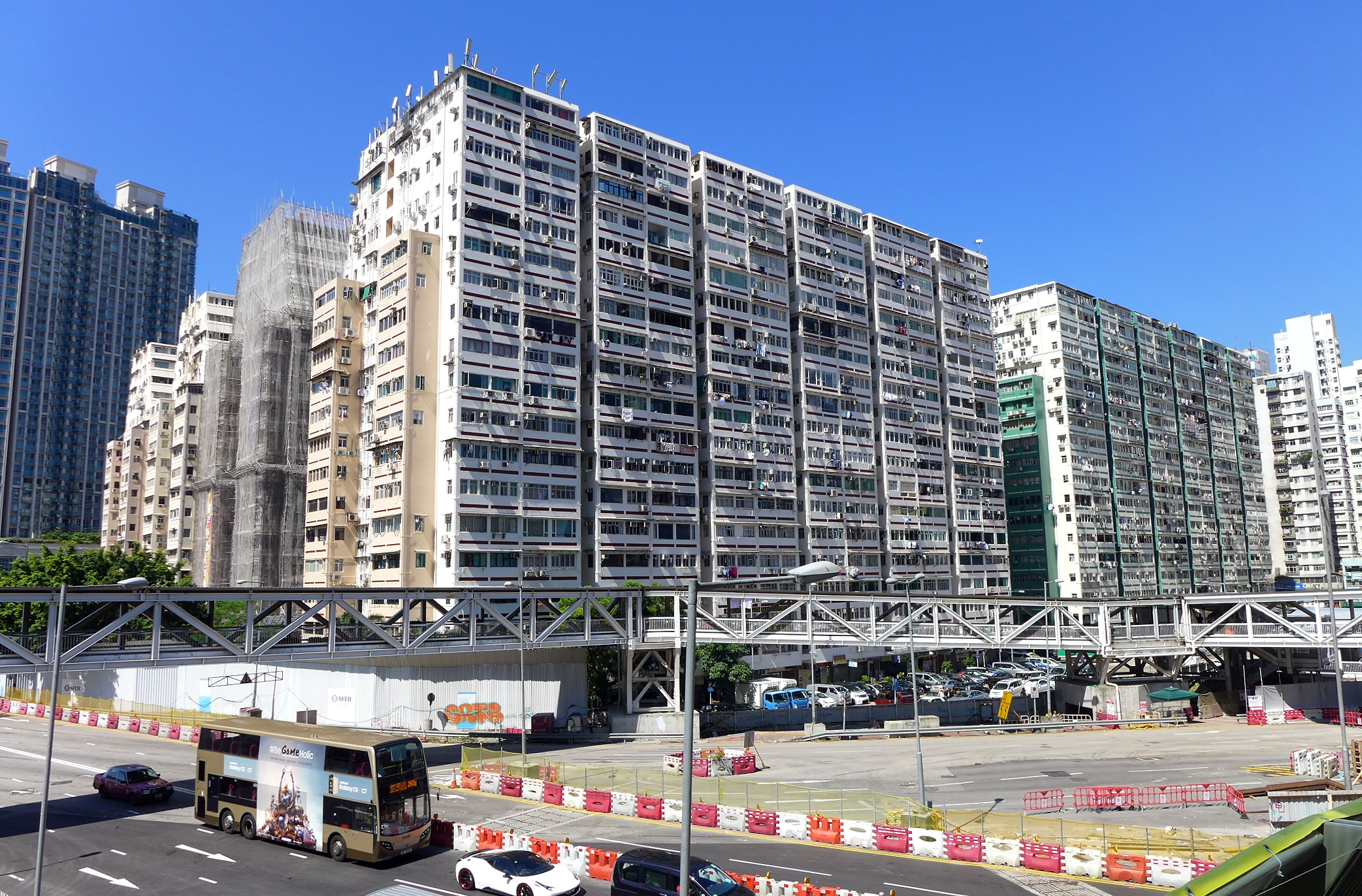
Man Wah Sun Chuen

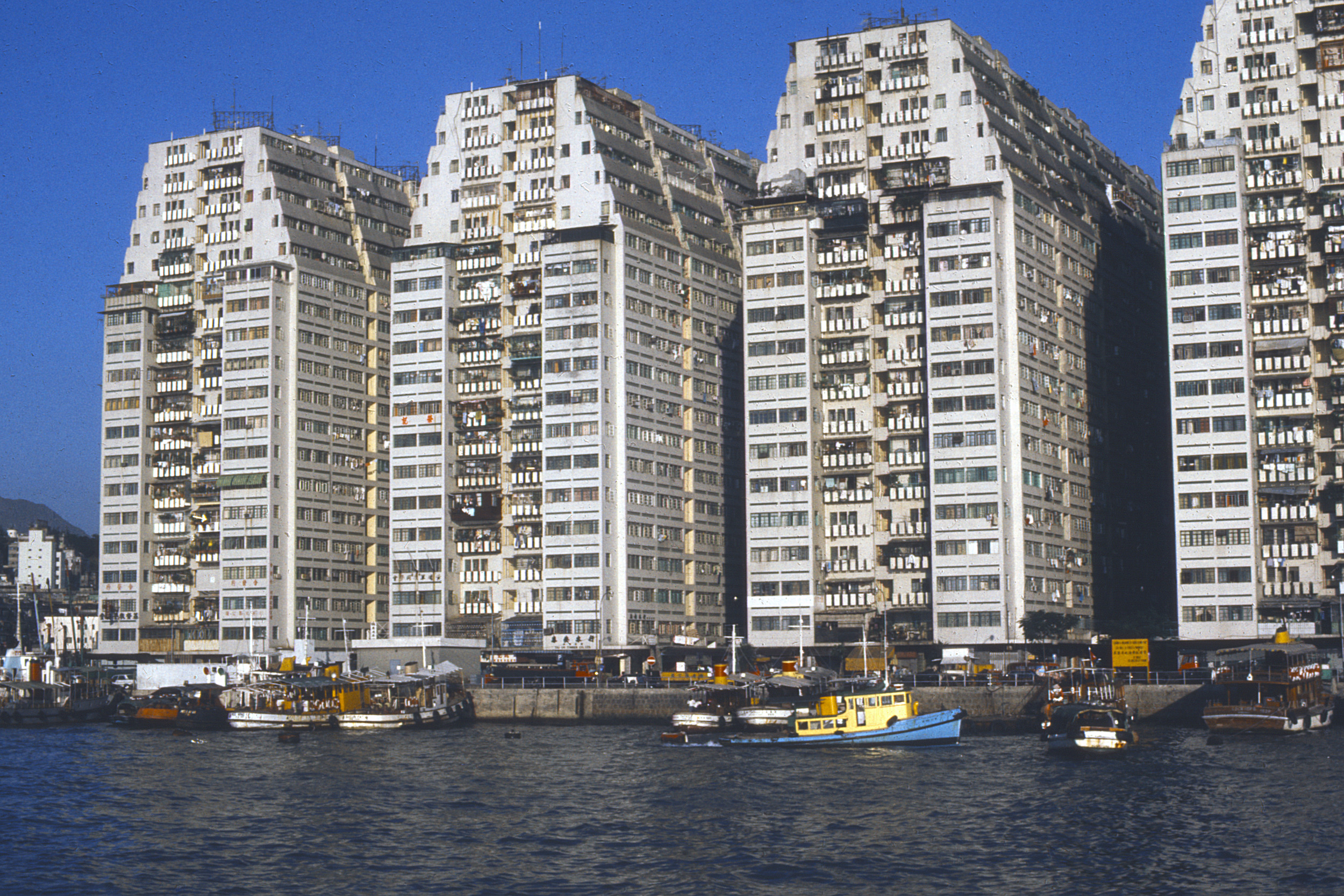
Man Wah Sun Chuen in 1976, then at the waterfront.

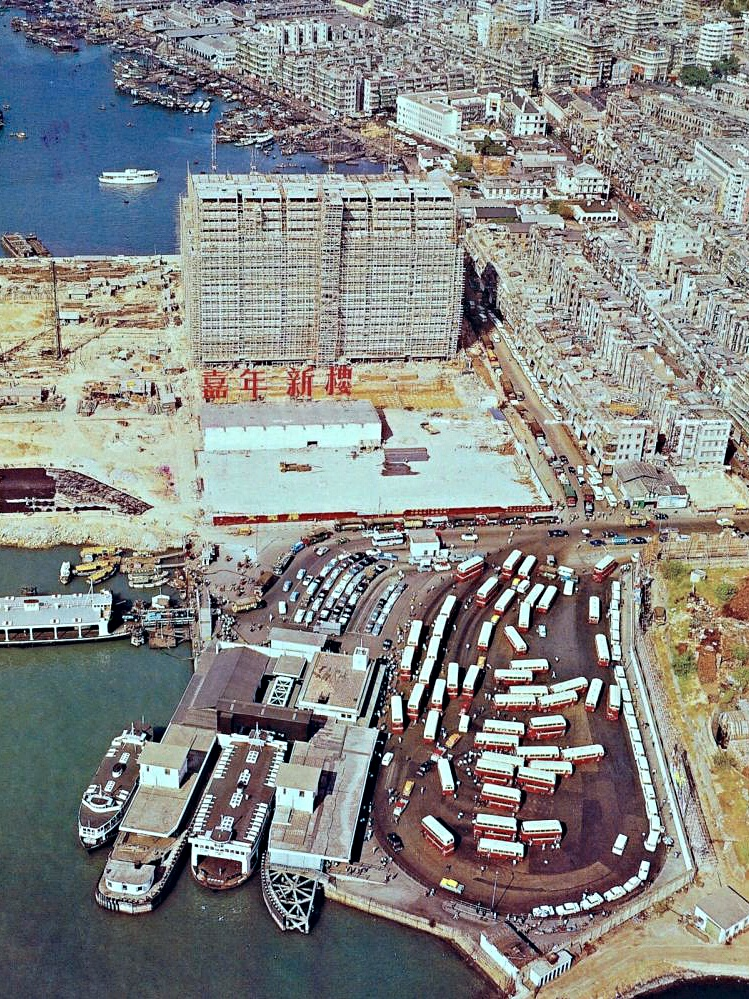
In 1964 Man Wah Sun Chuen was under construction. Jordan Road Ferry Piers, for passengers and vehicles, with a large bus terminus, situated south of the estate.

Man Wah Sun Chuen (Chinese: 文華新村) is a private housing estate in Ferry Point, next to Yau Ma Tei or Jordan/Kwun Chung on the west side of Kowloon in Hong Kong. On west side of a section of Ferry Street between Jordan Road and Saigon Street, it was near the former Jordan Road Ferry Pier, now replaced by MTR Austin station of Tuen Ma line and West Kowloon Station. It is where the area Ferry Point got its name.

Formerly the site of the warehouse of Yaumatei Ferry Pier on the reclaimed land of West Jordan, Man Wah Sun Chuen has a total of eight blocks built in 1960s and it is one of the oldest private housing estates in Hong Kong. It used be by the side of Victoria Harbour and Yau Ma Tei Typhoon Shelter, before the West Kowloon Reclamation was completed in the 1990s.

The estate, developed by Ka Lin Real Estate, was designed by architect Eric Byron Cumine, who designed many buildings in Hong Kong such as former Kai Tai Airport, Harbour City, and also Casino Lisboa in Macau. The design was under the influence of Building (Planning) Regulations in 1955, enacted in 1966, which relaxed the height limit and allow denser buildings. Each block of flats, comparable to the scale of Unité d'habitation in Marseille, contains 419 flats accommodating more than 1300 people. With total of eight blocks of eighteen storeys, it was expected to be the home of forty thousand people, reported in the Kung Sheung Daily News in 1963. The slant top setback was subject the regulation of right of light at that time, and the Bauhaus castle-like estate stood against the shoreline was spectacular.

The estate was expensive but welcomed by middle class of that time, where famous actors like Sammo Hung, Stephen Chow and Jackie Chan once lived there. As time goes by, the estate became more grassroots.

== See also ==
- Ferry Point, Hong Kong
- Jordan Road Ferry Pier
