= Ferry Point, Hong Kong =

Area of Kowloon, Hong Kong

Coordinates: 22°18′27″N 114°09′59″E

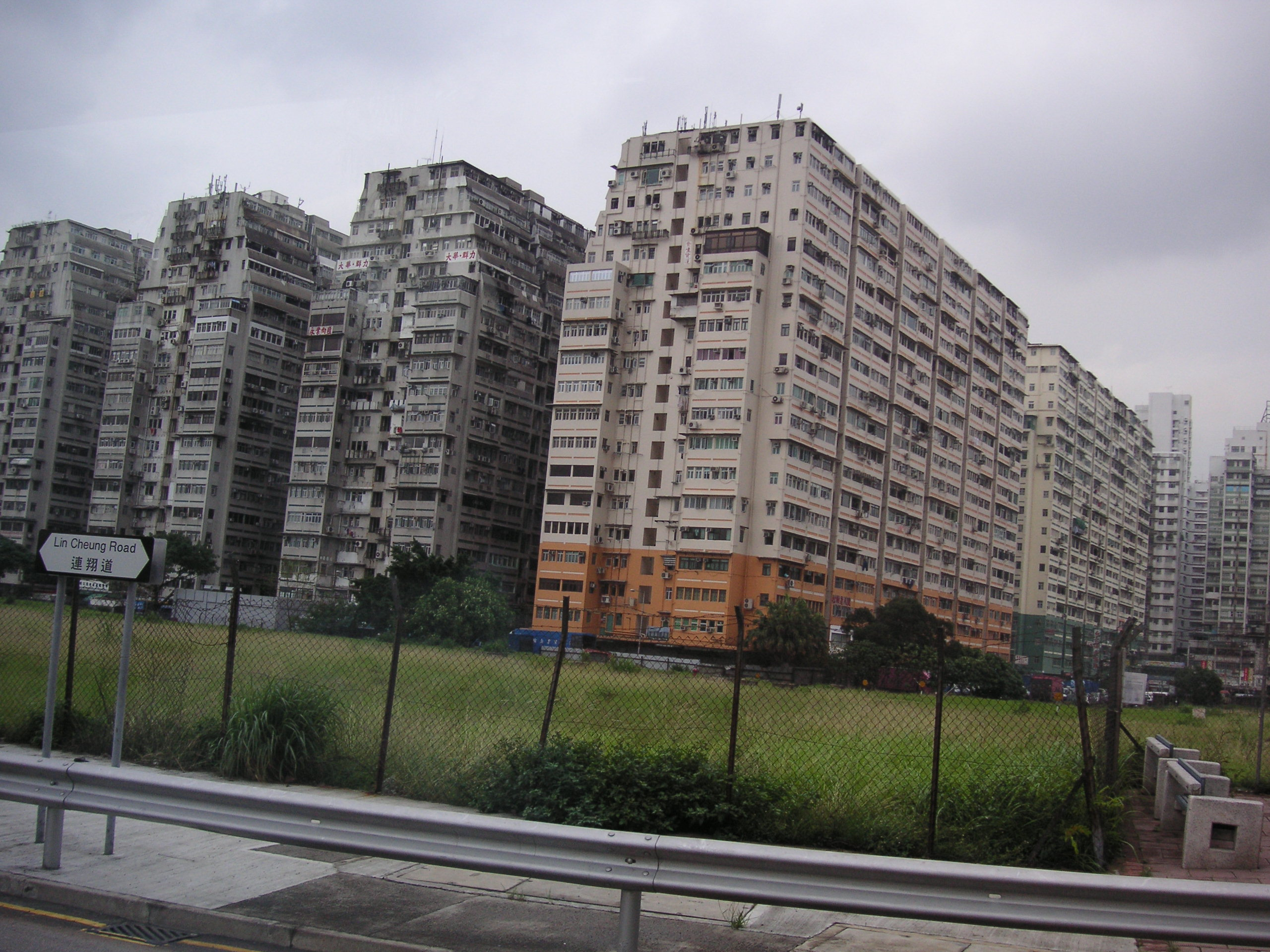
Ferry Point after the reclamation of West Kowloon in October 2005. Man Wah Sun Chuen was close to sea.

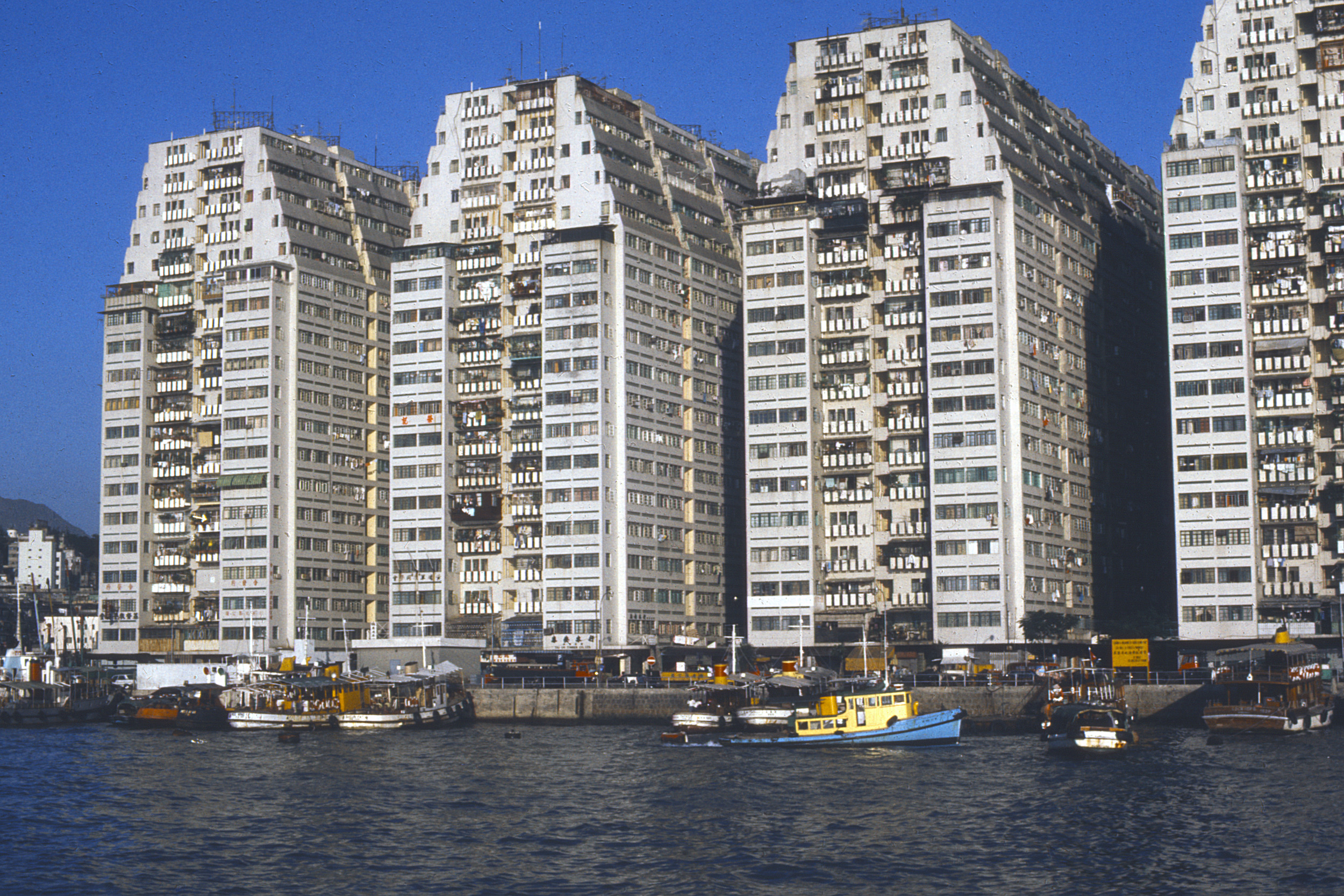
Man Wah Sun Chuen in 1976, then at the waterfront.

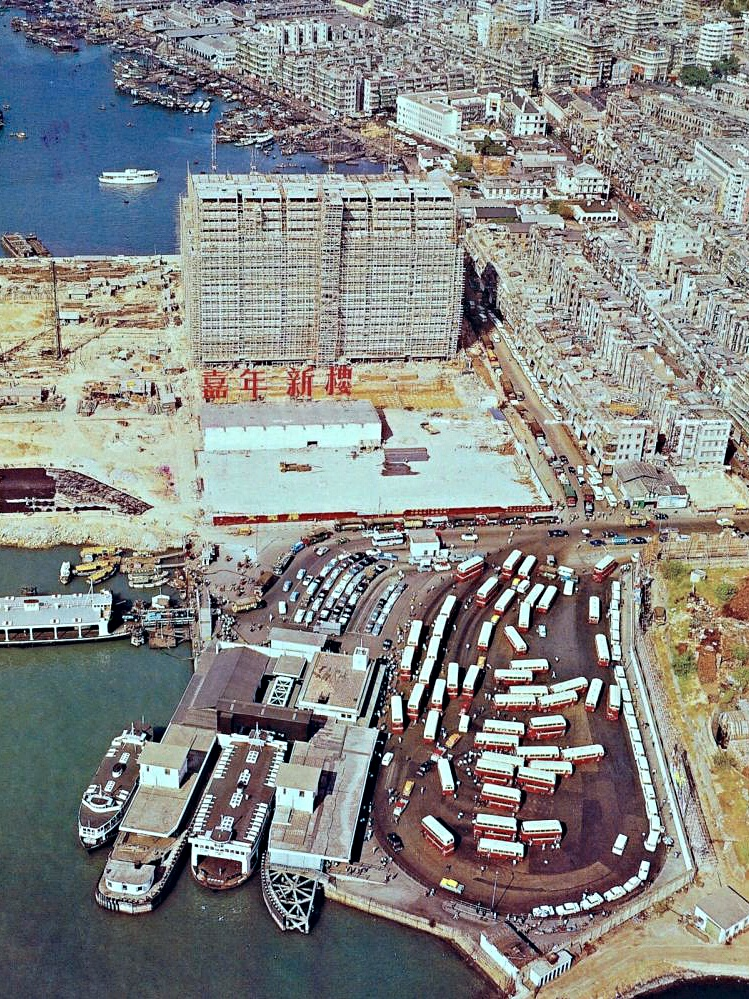
In 1964 Ferry Point under development. Jordan Road Ferry Piers, for passengers and vehicles, with a large bus terminus.

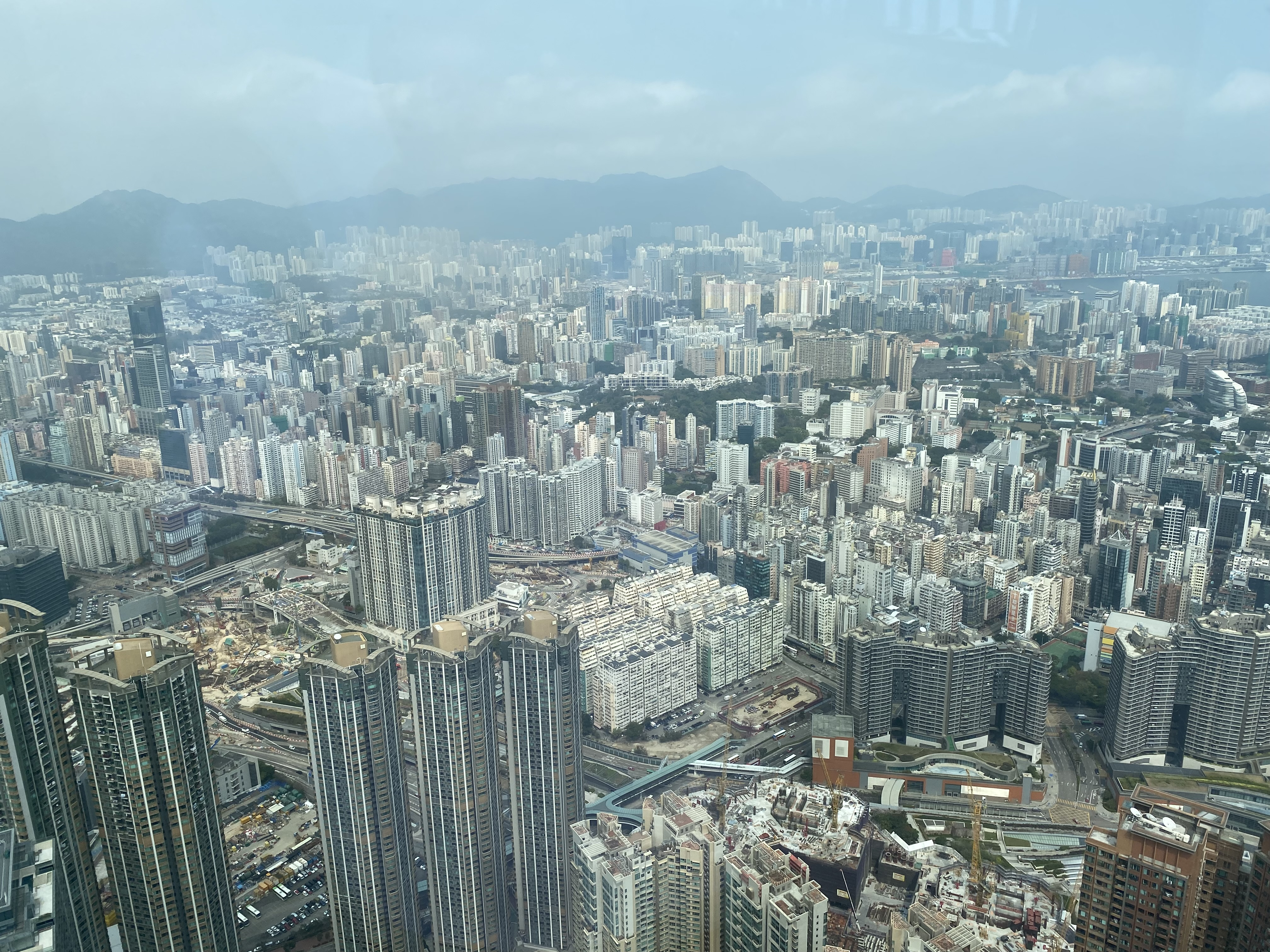
A view of Ferry Point and further east

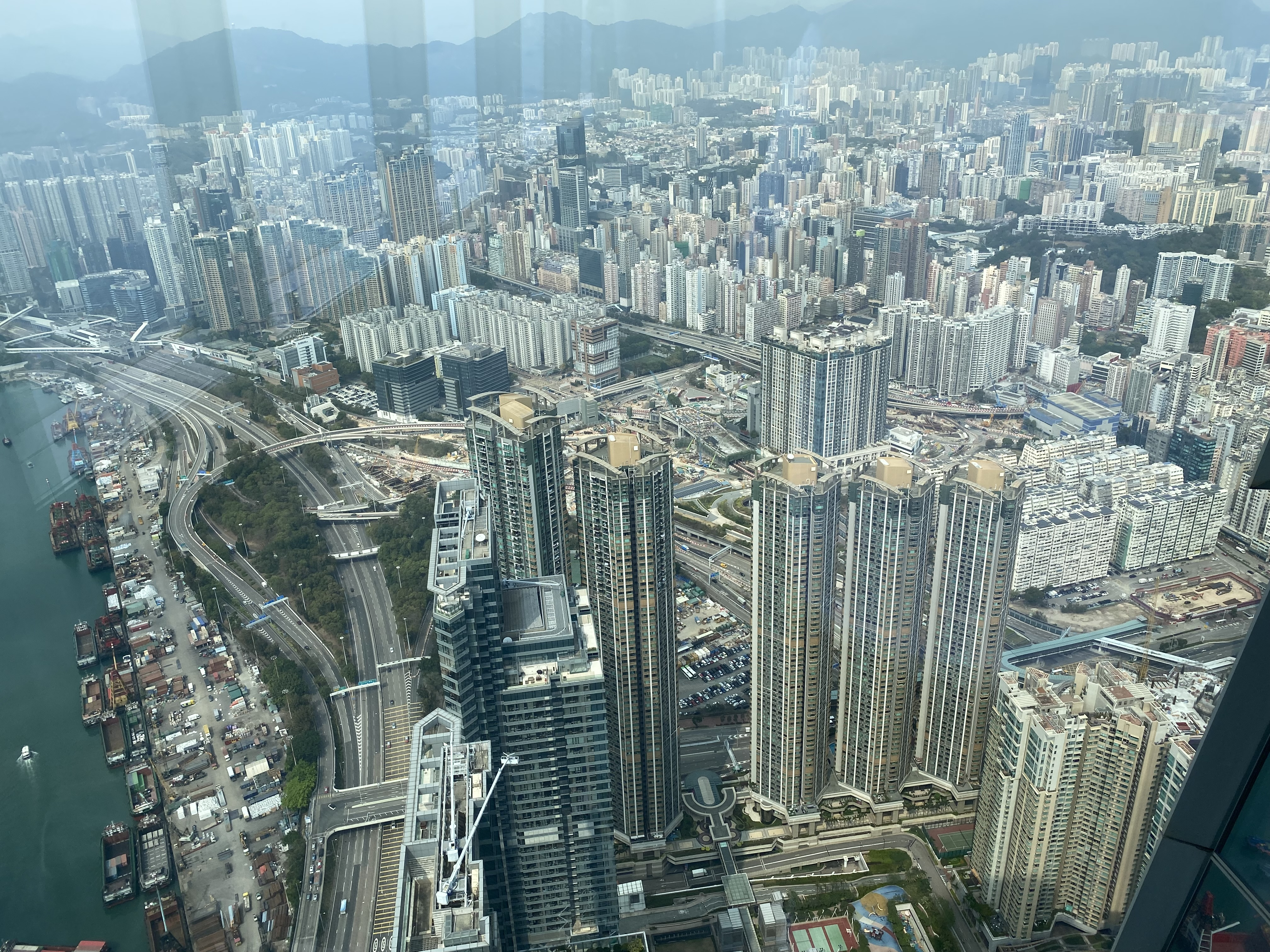
A view of Ferry Point and further north

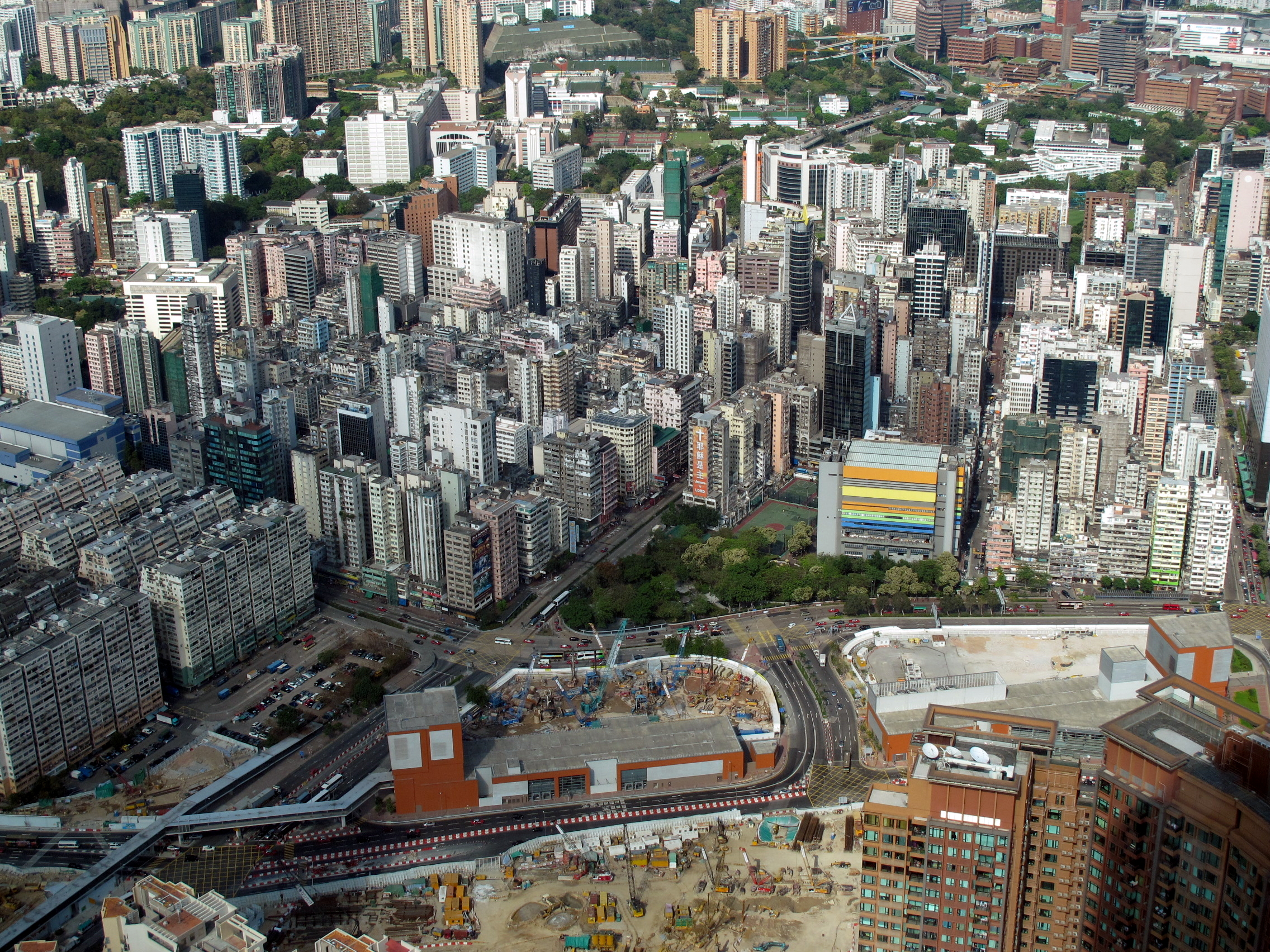
Ferry Point and Austin Station. In 2011, housing estates and West Kowloon Station were under construction.

Ferry Point (Chinese: 渡船角), also known as Austin and West Kowloon, is an area located on the west of Jordan/Kwun Chung in Kowloon of Hong Kong. The place names are in dynamic contest to each other over the reclamation of 1990s, with Ferry Point, from 1960s, centred in Man Wah Sun Chuen, West Kowloon, from 1990s, in Kowloon Station and Austin, from 2000s, in Austin Station. But West Kowloon is a vague place name which could extend northwest to Lai Chi Kok and even Stonecutters Island where the West Kowloon reclamation ends.

Ferry Point is often considered as the area at the west of Jordan and Kwun Chung, the south of Tai Kok Tsui and the east of Elements, a mall above Kowloon station of the MTR Airport Express and Tung Chung line in 1998.

Ferry Point was at the seafront and adjacent to former Jordan Road Ferry Pier, first vehicle ferry pier in Kowloon commencing in 1933, together with passenger service, connecting to Central on Island side. Bus terminus was built for commuters from Kowloon and the New Territories to cross Victoria Harbour. The reclamation coast was once occupied by industry with cotton warehouse and gas depot at that time.

The name Ferry Point came much later in 1963 when a housing estate development was proposed and finally named Man Wah Sun Chuen. Some business referred the place as Ferry Point and Ferry Point was marked on some maps in the area. After reclamation of West Kowloon in 1990s, the ferry pier was then demolished. The large reclamation surrounding Ferry Point made place names in the state of uncertain. Austin, named after opening of Austin Station of East Rail Line in 2009, with several new housing development, emerged as new name in place of Ferry Point.

The prominent location of the estate with excellent view of Victoria Harbour and large flats made it an expensive home in Kowloon at the beginning. Some famous film stars, Sammo Hung, Stephen Chow and Jackie Chan once lived there. After 1997, the Nepali, the legacy of Gurkha in former British Army in Hong Kong, settled in Ferry Point making the area with the scent of South Asian. The buildings that shaped like Namaste are favoured by the Nepali.

The role of transportation hub continues with three railway station, Kowloon Station, Austin Station and West Kowloon Station are next to each other in the area. West Kowloon Station Bus Terminus close to Man Wah San Chuen replaced Jordan Road Ferry Pier Bus Terminus as a large transit interchange in the area.

The development north includes Man Cheong Street Park with children's playground, amphitheatre, pet garden and alloment.

== History ==
Ferry Point was never a natural feature like North Point, East Point or West Point, but came from a proposed housing project for forty thousand people in 1963, west of Ferry Street, projecting into Victoria Harbour. It was a square piece of reclamation of two periods, first Marine Lot No. 89 around 1904 and 1907, and second around 1963. The housing estate of eight blocks of flats was later renamed to Man Wah Sun Chuen, and Ferry Point then was referred the area around it. The project included converting Ferry Street to a thoroughfare to the New Territories and expanding Jordan Road Ferry Pier Bus Terminus. Its north side was Yau Ma Tei Typhoon Shelter and south side the bus terminus and vehicle and passenger Jordan Road Ferry Pier, an important transportation hub before the commencement of Cross-Harbour Tunnel and Mass Transit Railway.

== Residential areas ==
One of the most notable residential developments in Ferry Point is Man Wah Sun Chuen, a private housing estate built in the 1970s. It remains a well-known landmark within the area.
