= Gilman's Bazaar =

Street in Central, Hong Kong

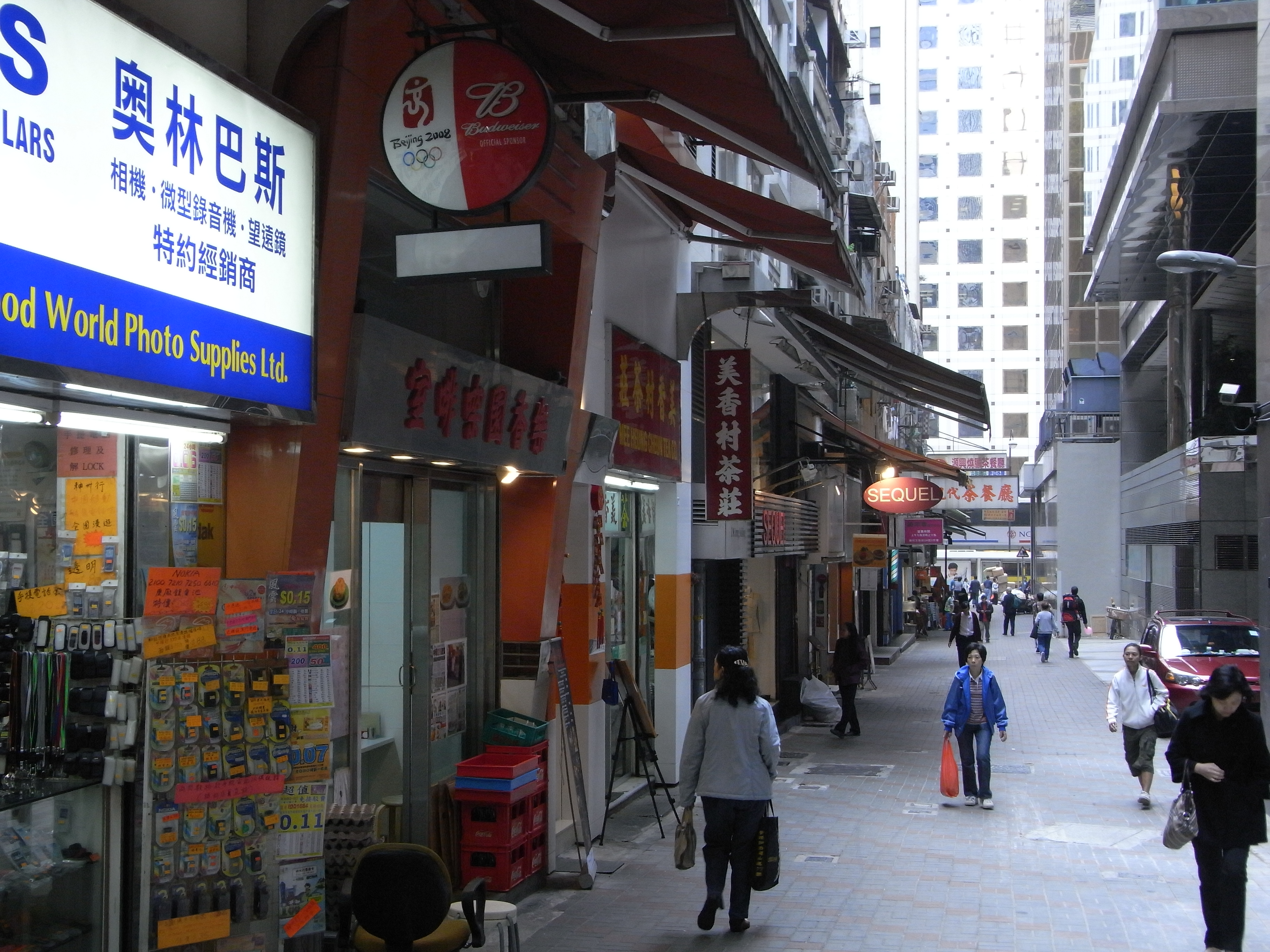
Gilman's Bazaar

Gilman's Bazaar (Chinese: 機利文新街; Jyutping: gei1 lei6 man4 san1 gaai1) is a street in Central, in the north of Hong Kong Island, Hong Kong, connecting Des Voeux Road Central in the northeast to Queen's Road Central in the southwest. An eastbound tram stop is located at its junction with Des Voeux Road Central.

The street is a well-known food street with more than 20 restaurants, including fast food, takeaway, Japanese cuisine, cha chaan teng, snake soup and bakeries.

It was named after Gilman, Bowman and Co., one of the four major British firms in Hong Kong in 1841 which occupied the area.

== H6 CONET ==
Gilman's Bazaar, together with Gilman Street, Wing On Street, Tung Man Street, Hing Lung Street and Tit Hong Lane are collectively known as "H6 CONET", a community public place with a pedestrian-oriented spatial design.

== Features ==
- The Center
- Gilman Street
- Des Voeux Road
- Queen's Road, Hong Kong
