= Tsim Sha Tsui East Ferry Pier =

Coordinates: 22.29759°N 114.17749°E

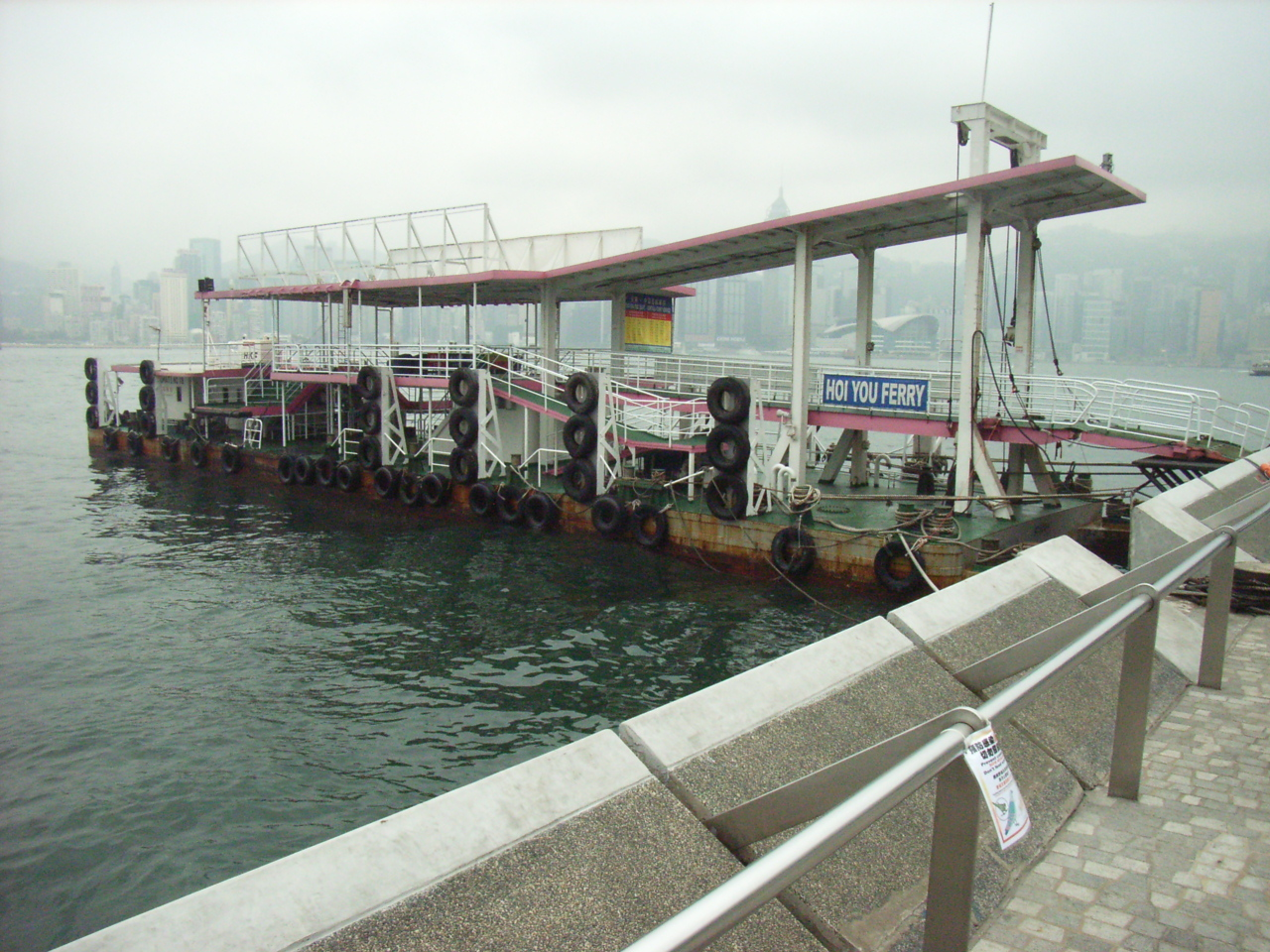
Former Tsim Sha Tsui East Ferry Pier c. 2007.

Tsim Sha Tsui East Ferry Pier (Chinese: 尖沙咀東碼頭) was a ferry pier in Salisbury Road, Tsim Sha Tsui East, Kowloon. The pier was firstly located outside Kowloon Shangri-La Hotel (九龍香格里拉酒店) but moved to outside InterContinental Grand Stanford Hong Kong (海景嘉福酒店) after 2000. It was closed and demolished in 2008.

== Ferry service ==
- 1986-1999
  - Tsim Sha Tsui East - Blake Pier / City Hall Ferry Pier (operated by Hongkong and Yaumati Ferry)
- 1999-2005
  - Tsim Sha Tsui East - Central Piers (operated by Discovery Bay Transportation Services)
- 2006-2008
  - Tsim Sha Tsui East - City Hall Ferry Pier / Central Piers (operated by Hoi You Ferry)

== See also ==
- List of demolished piers in Hong Kong
