= City Pier =

City Pier or variants may refer to:

- City Pier A, a municipal pier in the Hudson River at Battery Park near the southern end of Manhattan in New York City
- London Bridge City Pier (also known as "City Pier"), the main pier for the City of London and City Hall
- Kowloon City Ferry Pier
- City Hall Ferry Pier, a now-relocated barge pier at the east of ex-Queen's Pier outside Hong Kong City Hall
