= Chai Wan Ferry Pier =

Ferry pier in Chai Wan, Hong Kong

Chai Wan Ferry Pier (Chinese: 柴灣碼頭) (1965–1986) was a ferry pier in Chai Wan, Hong Kong, near the current Chai Wan Industrial City (Chinese: 柴灣工業城).

== History ==
Chai Wan Ferry Pier started operation in 1965 and provided ferry services to Central and Kwun Tong respectively, but the services were cancelled soon because of insufficient passenger numbers. Until the 1980s, the Hongkong and Yaumati Ferry reopened the ferry services. The pier was closed in 1986 after the Island Eastern Corridor and MTR Island line were opened. It now handles cargo and supports the annual dragon boat race. The minibus terminal near the pier was also once named "Chai Wan Pier." After the pier was decommissioned, the area was redeveloped into the Chai Wan Industrial City.

== See also ==
- List of demolished piers in Hong Kong
