= Cosmopolitan Dock =

Dockyard in Hong Kong

Cosmopolitan Dock (Chinese: 大同船塢; Jyutping: daai6 tung4 syun4 ou3) was one of the major dockyards in Hong Kong.

== History ==
Founded in 1880 and located on the exterior of former Tai Kok Tsui peninsula in Kowloon, the dockyard belonged to then-British owned Hutchison Whampoa. The dockyard was created from land reclamation in the 1870s.

Amid the Sino-French War in 1884 over the control of Vietnam, Chinese workers in the dockyard refused to serve on La Galissonnière, a French warship responsible for the bombardment of Keelung and Fuzhou. The crew eventually repaired the ship on their own.

In 1937, a hundred Norwegian, Danish and Swedish refugees who had fled the Japanese invasion of Shanghai were housed at the dock while they waited to be resettled. In the same year, the shipwrecked steamer named the An Lee was towed to the dock. The facilities closed in 1972, the dockyard was transformed from 1974 to 1976 into the housing complex known as Cosmopolitan Estate (14 13 floor towers) by Hutchison Whampoa (under the direction of Douglas Clague) in 1974. With the West Kowloon Reclamation Project the dockyard area is now landlocked and no evidence exists to link it to its past use.

On 16 January 1945, during the Japanese occupation of Hong Kong in World War II, the dockyard was bombed by aircraft of the United States.

== See also ==
- Taikoo Dockyard
- Hong Kong and Whampoa Dock
- Hongkong United Dockyards
