= The Center =

Skyscraper in Hong Kong

- 中環中心
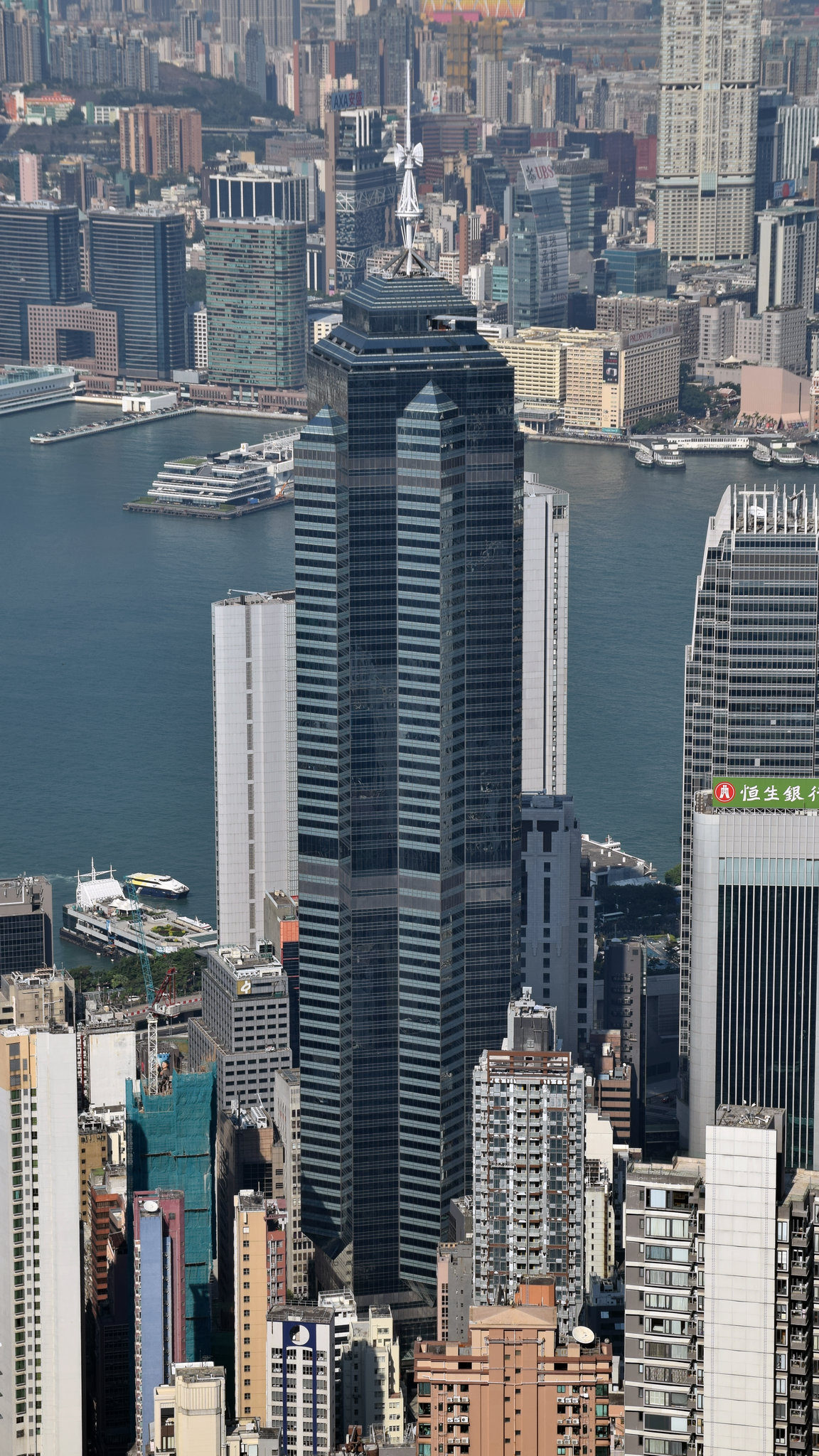
- The Center in 2018
- Interactive map of the The Center area

General information
- Type: Office
- Location: 99 Queen's Road Central, Central, Hong Kong
- Coordinates: 22°17′05″N 114°09′16″E
- Construction started: 1995; 31 years ago
- Completed: 1998; 28 years ago

Height
- Architectural: 346 m (1,135 ft)
- Roof: 292 m (958 ft)
- Top floor: 275 m (902 ft)

Technical details
- Floor count: 73
- Floor area: 130,032 m^{2} (1,399,653 sq ft)
- Lifts/elevators: 41, made by Toshiba

Design and construction
- Architects: Dennis Lau & Ng Chun Man Architects & Engineers (HK) Ltd.
- Developer: Cheung Kong; Land Development Corporation
- Structural engineer: Maunsell AECOM Group
- Main contractor: Paul Y – ITC Construction

The Center (Chinese: 中環中心; Cantonese Yale: Jūngwàahn Jūngsām) is the fifth tallest skyscraper in Hong Kong, after International Commerce Centre, Two International Finance Centre (88 storeys), Central Plaza and Bank of China Tower. With a height of 346 m (1,135 ft), it comprises 73 storeys. The Center is one of the few skyscrapers in Hong Kong that is entirely steel-structured with no reinforced concrete core and is one of the tallest steel buildings in the world. It is located on 99 Queen's Road Central in the Central, roughly halfway between the MTR Island line's Sheung Wan and Central stations.

== Naming ==
The English name of the building uses the American spelling "The Center", despite the vast majority of similarly named buildings in Hong Kong using the spelling "Centre" as a result of Hong Kong English's British origins. The direct translation of the Chinese name of the building is "Central Centre" or the "centre of Central", though the building is situated near the boundary of Central and Sheung Wan (Wing Kut Street).

== Background ==
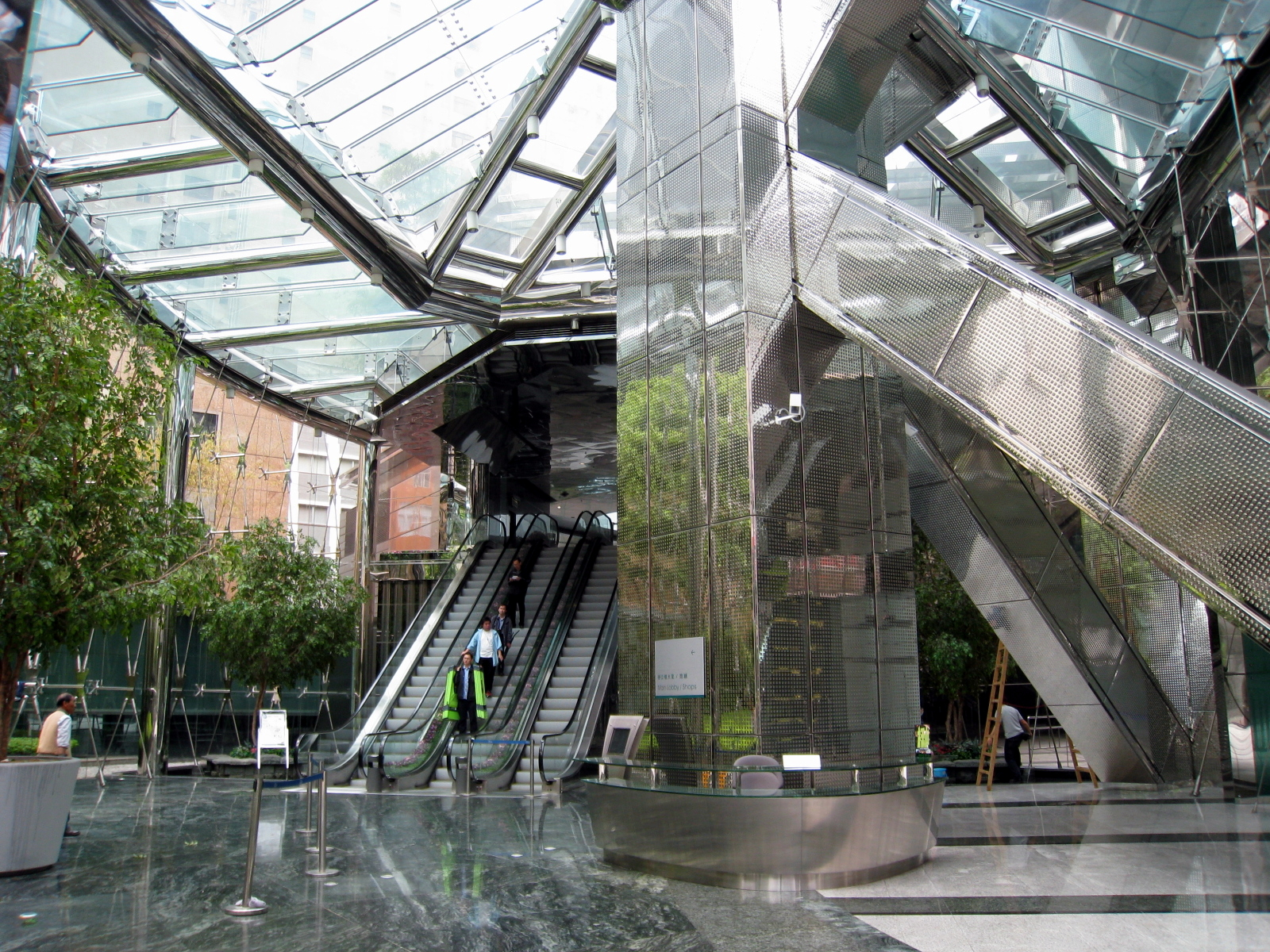
The ground floor lobby of The Center

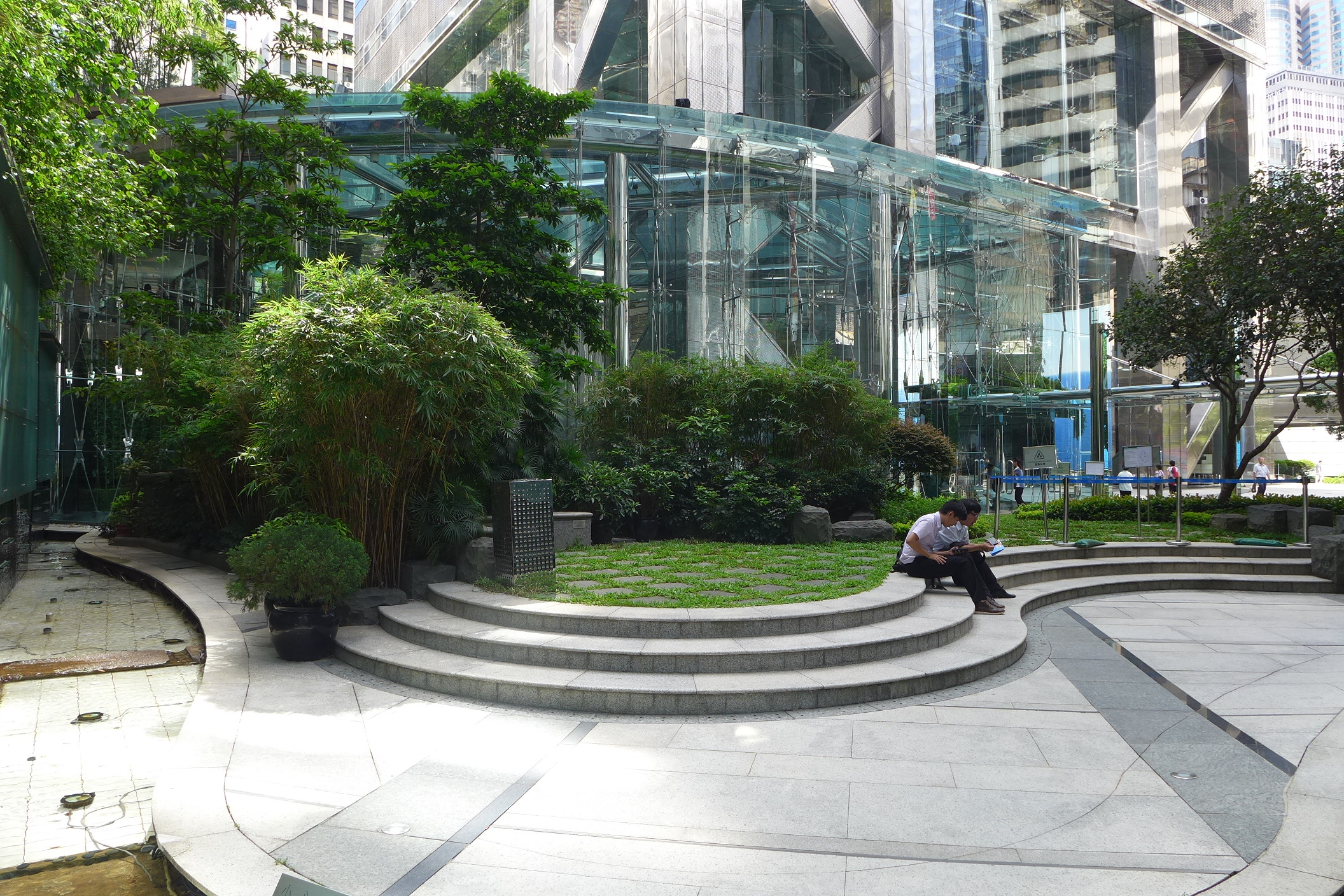
Public Open Space: Cheung Fat Garden

The Center was designed by Dennis Lau & Ng Chun Man Architects & Engineers.

The footprint of The Center is irregular because surrounding lots in Queen's Road Central, Jubilee Street, Des Voeux Road Central and Gilman's Bazaar were already redeveloped. The construction of the building involved the Land Development Corporation since it required demolishing many old buildings and lanes. Various lanes and streets including Gilman Street, Wing On Street, Tung Man Street, Hing Lung Street, and Tit Hong Lane were shortened. Many cloth shops located on Wing On Street, also known as Cloth Alley, were moved to the Western Market while Eu Yan Sang, a traditional Chinese medicine shop, was moved near the Stag Building. Several historical structures were demolished for the project.

The Center is notable for its arrangement of hundreds of neon lights arranged as bars in increasing frequency towards the top of the building, which slowly scroll through the colours of the spectrum at night. During the Christmas season, the building's neon arrangement follows a festive motif and resembles a Christmas tree.

The building uses a sky lobby system, where users wishing to reach the upper floors of the building must make several lifts changes. One set of lifts leads from the ground floor to the 6th floor; a second set of lifts provides access from the 6th floor to the 42nd floor, and a final set provides access to the floors above.

In November 2017, it was announced that The center was sold for HK$40.2 billion, making it the world's most-expensive real estate transaction for a single building. It was reported that Li Ka-shing's CK Asset Holdings sold the building to a BVI company called CHMT Peaceful Development Asia Limited, which is thought to be led by state-owned China National Petroleum Corporation.

== See also ==
- List of tallest buildings in Hong Kong
- List of buildings and structures in Hong Kong
- List of tallest freestanding steel structures
- List of tallest freestanding structures
