= Ngau Tau Kok Ferry Pier =

Former pier in Hong Kong

Ngau Tau Kok Ferry Pier (Chinese: 牛頭角碼頭) (1953 - 1960s) was a ferry pier in Ngau Tau Kok in Kwun Tong District, Kowloon, Hong Kong. Its location is now near Wharf T&T Square (九倉電訊廣場), Wai Yip Street (偉業街).

The pier started operation in 1953 and it provided ferry service to Wan Chai and walla-walla service to North Point respectively. In the 1960s, it was relocated to the junction of Hoi Bun Road (海濱街) and Tsun Yip Street (駿業街) to cope with the land reclamation and it was renamed to "Kwun Tong Ferry Pier".

== See also ==
- List of demolished piers in Hong Kong
