= List of storms named Hope =

The name Hope has been used for six tropical cyclones worldwide, one in the Atlantic Ocean and five in the Western Pacific Ocean.

In the Atlantic:

- Tropical Storm Hope (1978) – remained over the open ocean

In the Western Pacific:

- Typhoon Hope (1976) – churned out at sea
- Typhoon Hope (1979) (09W, Ising, 3B) – Category 4 super typhoon brushed Taiwan then struck southern China; subsequently restrengthened to a severe tropical storm in the Bay of Bengal
- Tropical Storm Hope (1982) (Pasing) – struck Vietnam
- Typhoon Hope (1985) (Unsing) – threatened Luzon but turned north and eastward out to sea
- Tropical Storm Hope (1989) (09W, Huling) – made landfall in China, causing widespread damage in Zhejiang and Fujian provinces, killing at least 198 people.

In the Australian Region:

- Cyclone Hope (1976) – a Category 1 tropical cyclone that minimal affected New Caledonia.
