= Mong Kok Ferry Pier =

Ferry pier in Hong Kong

Coordinates: 22.3169°N 114.1659°E

Mong Kok Ferry Pier (1924–1972) (Chinese: 旺角碼頭) was a ferry pier to the west of Shantung Street, Mong Kok, Kowloon, Hong Kong, located inside the old Yau Ma Tei Typhoon Shelter. The site was covered over during land reclamation under the West Kowloon Reclamation Project.

== History ==
The pier started operation in 1924 when the Hong Kong and Yaumati Ferry Company took over the franchise for ferry services from Sham Shui Po, Mong Kok, Yau Ma Tei to Central.

In the 1960s, the pier had its bus terminus, with KMB routes 2B, 11C, 12B and 13D parked there. The pier was later demolished and replaced by the nearby Tai Kok Tsui Ferry Pier (大角咀碼頭) in 1972.

== See also ==
- List of demolished piers in Hong Kong
