= Sham Shui Po Ferry Pier =

Ferry pier in Kowloon, Hong Kong

Coordinates: 22.3267°N 114.1536°E

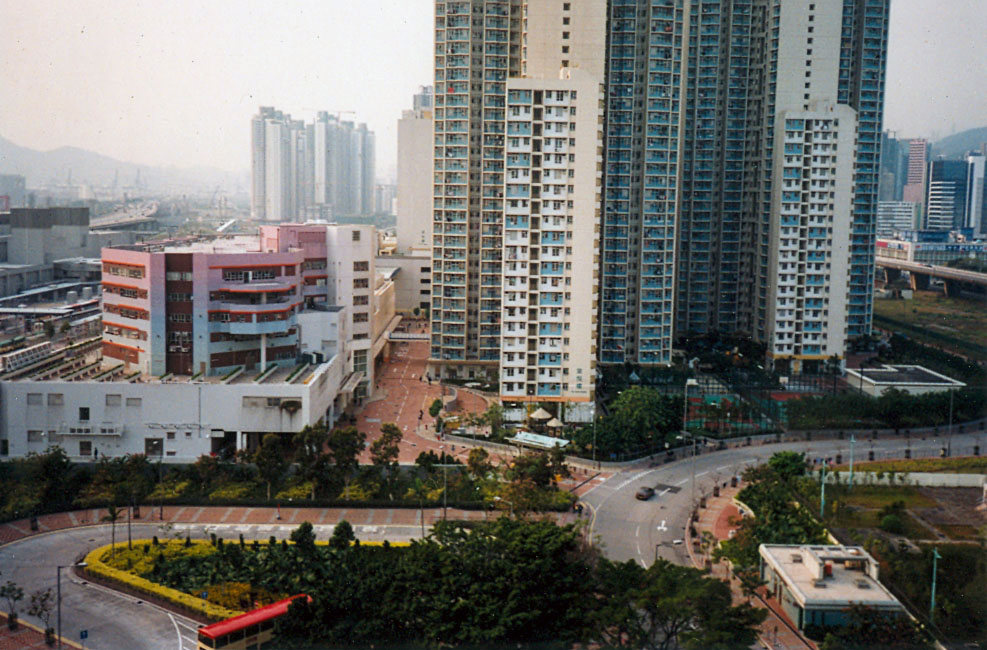
Fu Cheong Estate in Sham Shui Po, former location of Sham Shui Po Ferry Pier

Sham Shui Po Ferry Pier (Chinese: 深水埗碼頭; Jyutping: sam1 seoi2 bou4 maa5 tau4) was a ferry pier in Sham Shui Po, Kowloon, Hong Kong that operated from 1919 to 1992. It was one of the important ferry piers in West Kowloon and had a bus terminus nearby.

== History ==
Over the years the pier was situated in three different locations. The first one was located on the coast at the end of Nam Cheong Street. Starting on the 1 January 1919, the Kau Lung Sze Yeuk Kai Fong Ferry Company operated between Sham Shui Po, Kowloon and West Point/Eastern Street. In 1924, the ferry Service was transferred the Hongkong and Yaumati Ferry Company (HYF) which served also Central.

In 1929 it was decided by the Hong Kong Government to replace the old wooden pier by a reinforced concrete one. The second pier was located on the coast at the junction of Tung Chau Street (通州街) and Pei Ho Street. It opened in July 1931 and provided ferry services to and from Central, Sheung Wan and Macau.

It was relocated again (third generation) to the shore next to Yen Chow Street in 1979 to cope with land reclamation work and the construction of the Nam Cheong Estate.The ferry service to and from Sheung Wan was terminated in 1979 due to the destruction of Wilmer Street Ferry Pier (威利麻街) in Sheung Wan by a typhoon. The service to and from Macau was terminated in 1989 and replaced by the Hong Kong China Ferry Terminal in Tsim Sha Tsui. The service between Central and Sham Shui Po was terminated in 1992 and the pier was also closed. However, the bus terminus was still in use until it was replaced by another bus terminal in Tonkin Street in 1999.

The Fu Cheong Estate has since been built on the former site of the bus terminus. The pier has also been reclaimed and the MTR Nam Cheong station now stands in its place.

== Bus routes ==
There were several bus routes that terminated at Sham Shui Po Ferry Pier Bus Terminus before it was closed in 1999.

- KMB 2A: To Kowloon City Ferry Pier / Ngau Tau Kok
- KMB 2B (2nd generation): To Hung Hom Ferry Pier / Kowloon City Ferry Pier
- KMB 2F (1st generation): To Tai Wo Ping
- KMB 4: To Jordan Road Ferry Pier
- KMB 12: To Hong Kong China Ferry Terminal
- KMB 12A: To Whampoa Garden
- KMB 18: To Kowloon City Ferry Pier / Hung Hom Ferry Pier / Hung Hom station / Whampoa Garden
- KMB 31B: To Shek Lei Estate
- KMB 33: To Tsuen Wan Ferry Pier
- KMB 33A (1st generation): To North Kwai Chung
- KMB 33A (2nd generation): To Middle Kwai Chung
- KMB 33B: To Kwai Hing Estate
- KMB 33C: To Kwai Fong Estate
- KMB 35A: To Shek Yam Estate
- KMB 36A: To Lei Muk Shue Estate
- KMB 37A: To East Kwai Shing
- KMB 41A: To Cheung On Estate
- KMB 44 (Special route): To Tsing Yi Estate
- KMB 44B: To Cheung Ching Estate
- KMB 46: To Lai Yiu Estate
- KMB 52X: To Tuen Mun Town Centre
- KMB 59A: To Tuen Mun Ferry Pier
- KMB 68A (1st generation): To Long Ping Estate
- KMB 72: To Tai Po Market
- KMB/CMB/NWFB 114: To Central (Hong Kong Macau Ferry Terminal) (now Route 914)
- KMB/CMB/CTB 117: To Happy Valley (Lower)
- KMB 212: To Whampoa Garden
- KMB/CMB/NWFB 914: To Causeway Bay (Tin Hau)

== See also ==
- List of demolished piers in Hong Kong
