= Gilman Street =

Street in Central, Hong Kong

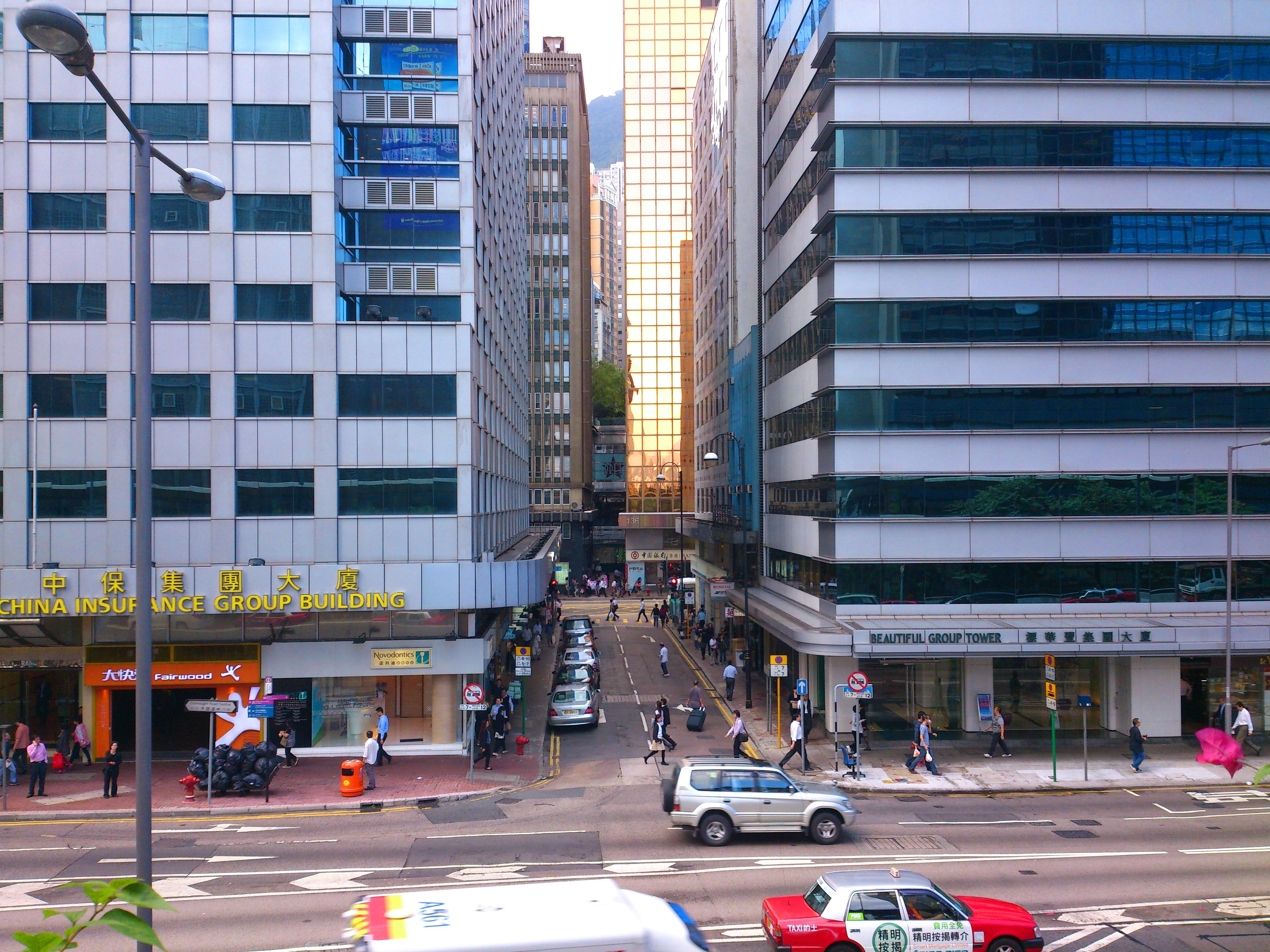
Gilman Street viewed from Connaught Road Flyover in November 2012

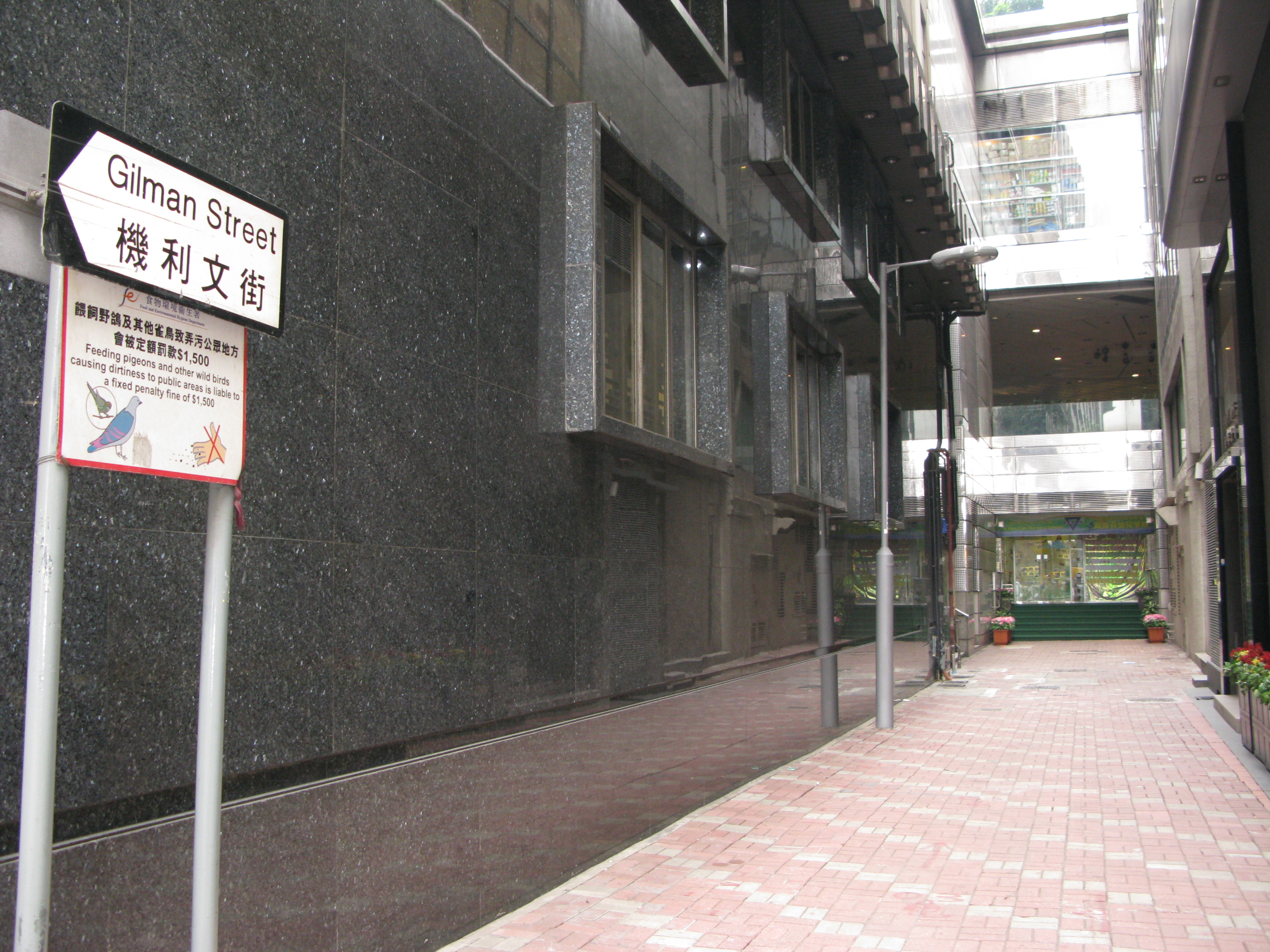
The southern dead-end section of the street in March 2011

Gilman Street (Chinese: 機利文街) is a street in Central, Hong Kong.

The street starts north at Connaught Road Central, crosses Des Voeux Road Central and continued as a dead-end pathway leading to several shops at the Centre. The street used to end at Queen's Road Central. The section between Des Voeux Road and Queen's Road used to allow vehicular traffic like the northern portion, and was once much wider. Nonetheless, as a result of large scale property developments like the Center, much of this section was demolished.

A tram stop is located at its junction with Des Voeux Road Central.

== Name ==
The street, like Gilman's Bazaar, a famous food street one block east was named after Gilman, Bowman and Co., one of the major British firms in Hong Kong in the mid-19th century which occupied the area.

== See also ==
- List of streets and roads in Hong Kong
