= Tai Kok Tsui Ferry Pier =

Ferry pier in Hong Kong

Coordinates: 22.3188°N 114.1610°E

Tai Kok Tsui Ferry Pier (1972–1992; Chinese: 大角咀碼頭) was a ferry pier in Tai Kok Tsui, Kowloon, Hong Kong. It started operation in 1972, together with an adjacent bus terminus, to replace the Mong Kok Ferry Pier in Mong Kok. It provided a ferry service to and from Central, Hong Kong, and Guangzhou, mainland China. Its cross-boundary ferry terminal position was replaced by the Hong Kong China Ferry Terminal in Tsim Sha Tsui in 1988. It was then closed in 1992 to cope with land reclamation work for the Airport Core Programme. The bus terminus remained in use until it was relocated to a new reclaimed area in west Tai Kok Tsui in 1995. The pier has been reclaimed and the HSBC Centre now stands where the former bus terminal used to be.

Monty Python comedian Michael Palin passed through the Ferry Pier in June 1988 while filming for the BBC series Around the World in 80 Days. He took a ferry to Guangzhou.

== See also ==
- List of demolished piers in Hong Kong
