= Jordan Road Ferry Pier =

Demolished pier originally located at Jordan Road, Jordan, Hong Kong

Coordinates: 22.3077°N 114.1652°E

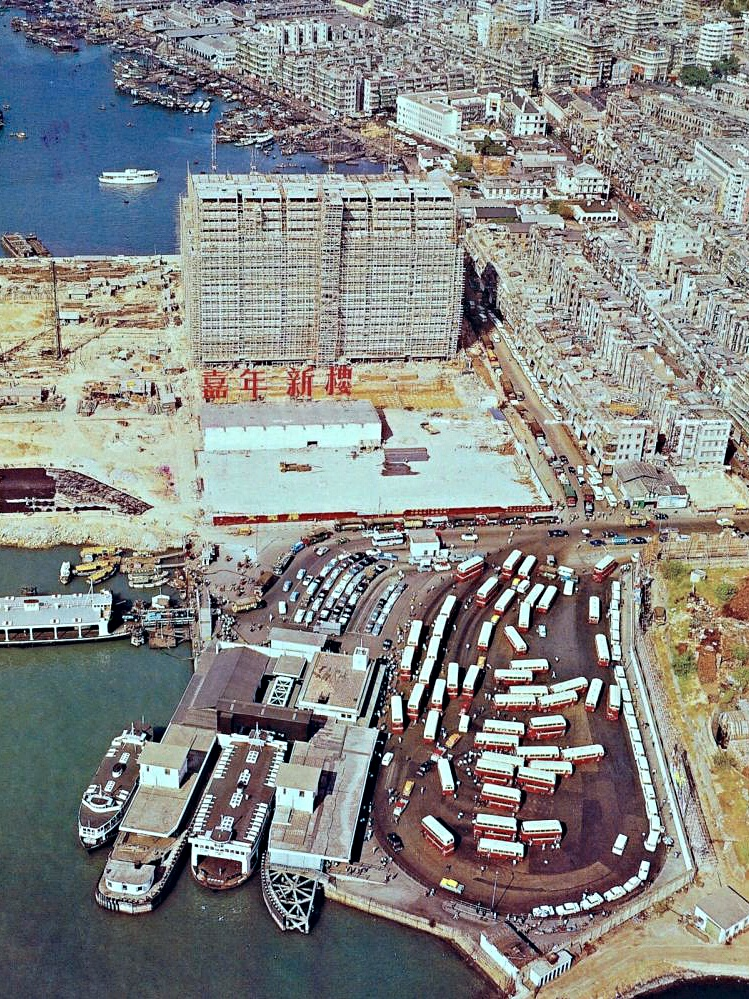
Jordan Road Ferry Pier c. 1964

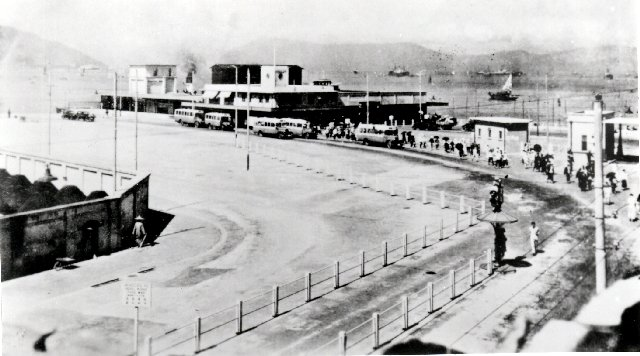
Concourse of the Jordan Road vehicular ferry in the 1930s

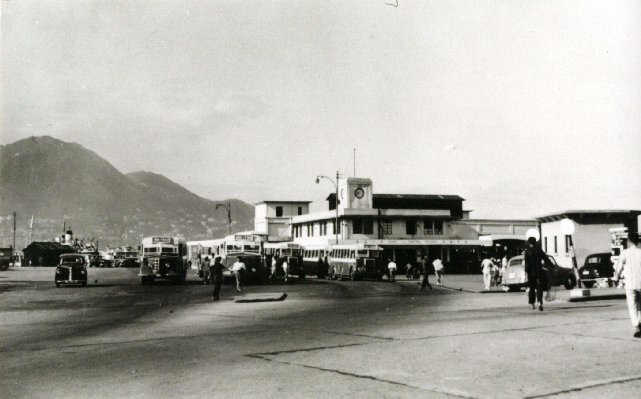
Bus terminus at concourse of the Jordan Road vehicular ferry in the 1950s

Jordan Road Ferry Pier or Ferry Point (1924–1998) (Chinese: 佐敦道碼頭) is a demolished pier originally located at Jordan Road, Jordan, Hong Kong. The site is turned into the MTR Austin Station.

== History ==
After Hongkong and Yaumati Ferry gained the franchise to operate part of the cross harbour ferry routes, including the Central – Yau Ma Tei route, starting from 1 January 1924, the company set up Yaumatei Ferry Pier at Public Square Street for its ferry operations. In 1933, a new vehicular ferry route from Central to Yau Ma Tei was started, and Jordan Road Ferry Pier was built to handle vehicular ferries. Original ferry operations also moved to the new pier. A new bus terminus was built outside the pier.

However, the demand for the pier started to decline after the opening of Cross-Harbour Tunnel in 1972 and commencement of complete operation of the Modified Initial System of MTR in 1980. In 1996, the pier was demolished due to reclamation in west Kowloon, and operations moved to the nearby Canton Road Government Dockyards Temporary Pier still under the name of Jordan Road Ferry Pier. All ferry routes from the pier were suspended starting from 2 February 1998.

== Ferry routes ==
- Jordan Road – Central (vehicular and passenger service)
- Jordan Road – Wan Chai (passenger service)

== Bus routes ==
- KMB 2B (3rd generation): To Kowloon City Ferry Pier (Night service)
- KMB 3: To Kowloon City/Chuk Yuen(Wong Tai Sin later)/Diamond Hill MTR Station
- KMB 3A: To Ho Man Tin Village
- KMB 3C: To Tsz Wan Shan (South)/Tsz Wan Shan (North)
- KMB 3E: To Tsz Wan Shan (Wai Wah Street) (renamed to Route 203E in 1992)
- KMB 4: To Sham Shui Po Ferry Pier/Cheung Sha Wan
- KMB 4A: To Tai Hang Tung Estate
- KMB 8 (1st generation): To Kowloon Tong
- KMB 8 (2nd generation): To Tsim Sha Tsui Ferry Pier
- KMB 9 (1st generation): To Yuen Long (renamed to Route 50 in 1973)
- KMB 10 (1st generation): To Ngau Chi Wan
- KMB 10 (2nd generation): To Tsim Sha Tsui Ferry Pier
- KMB 11: To Kowloon City/Chuk Yuen/Wong Tai Sin/Diamond Hill
- KMB 11A: To Kowloon City Ferry Pier
- KMB 11C (1st generation): To Hung Hom/Hung Hom Ferry Pier
- KMB 12: To Lai Chi Kok
- KMB 13: To Kowloon City/Ngau Chi Wan/Choi Hung Estate
- KMB 14 (1st generation): To Ngau Chi Wan/Choi Hung Estate
- KMB 14 (2nd generation): To Yau Tong
- KMB 14A: To Kwun Tong
- KMB 14X: To Yau Tong
- KMB 15 (1st generation): To Man Kam To
- KMB 15A (1st generation): To Sheung Shui (renamed to Route 19A in 1968)
- KMB 15B (1st generation): To Sha Tin
- KMB 16 (1st generation): To Yuen Long (renamed to Route 50 in 1973)
- KMB 16A: To Tsuen Wan/Tsuen Wan West/Tsuen Wan Ferry Pier (renamed to Route 30 in 1973)
- KMB 16B (1st generation): To Man Wan Ferry Pier
- KMB 16B (2nd generation): To Tsuen Wan West
- KMB 16B (3rd generation): To Tsuen Wan
- KMB 16B (5th generation): To North Kwai Chung (later renamed to Shek Lei) (renamed to Route 36B and re-terminated to Lei Muk Shue Estate in 1967)
- KMB 16C: To Castle Peak
- KMB 19: To Sheung Shui (renamed to Route 70 in 1973)
- KMB 19B: To Sha Tin
- KMB 20: To Oi Man Estate
- KMB 26 (1st generation): To Yuen Long (renamed to Route 51 and re-terminated to Tai Kok Tsui Ferry Pier in 1973)
- KMB 27 (1st generation): To Castle Peak Hospital
- KMB 36B: To Lei Muk Shue Estate
- KMB 42A: To Cheung Hang Estate
- KMB 46: To Lai Yiu Estate
- KMB 60X: To Tuen Mun Town Centre
- KMB 63X: To Tin Tsz Estate
- KMB 68: To Yuen Long (East)
- KMB 68S/N68: To Yuen Long (East) (Special days night service route)
- KMB 68X: To Yuen Long (East)
- KMB 69P (1st generation): To Tin Shui Wai Town Centre (Only in service during weekday peak hours)
- KMB 69X: To Tin Shui Estate
- KMB 70: To Sheung Shui
- KMB 70A: To Sha Tin/Lek Yuen Estate/Wo Che Estate
- KMB 70B: To Tai Po Market
- KMB 70S: To Wo Hop Shek (only in service during Ching Ming Festival and Chung Yeung Festival holidays)
- KMB 71/81: To Sha Tin/Sha Tin Market (renamed to Route 81 and re-terminated to Wo Che Estate)
- KMB 95: To Tsui Lam Estate
- KMB 98D: To Hang Hau (North)
- KMB/CMB/NWFB 110: To Sai Wan Ho Ferry Pier/Shau Kei Wan
- KMB 203E: To Fu Shan Estate
- KMB 205: To Choi Hung Estate
- KMB 270A: To Choi Yuen Estate/Sheung Shui
- KMB 296D: To Sheung Tak Estate
- KMB 2E, 8A, 11C (1st generation), 202, K15: Via Jordan Road Ferry

== See also ==
- List of demolished piers in Hong Kong
- Ferry Point, Hong Kong
- Airport Core Programme
