= Jubilee Street, Hong Kong =

Street in Central, Hong Kong

Coordinates: 22.284123°N 114.155394°E

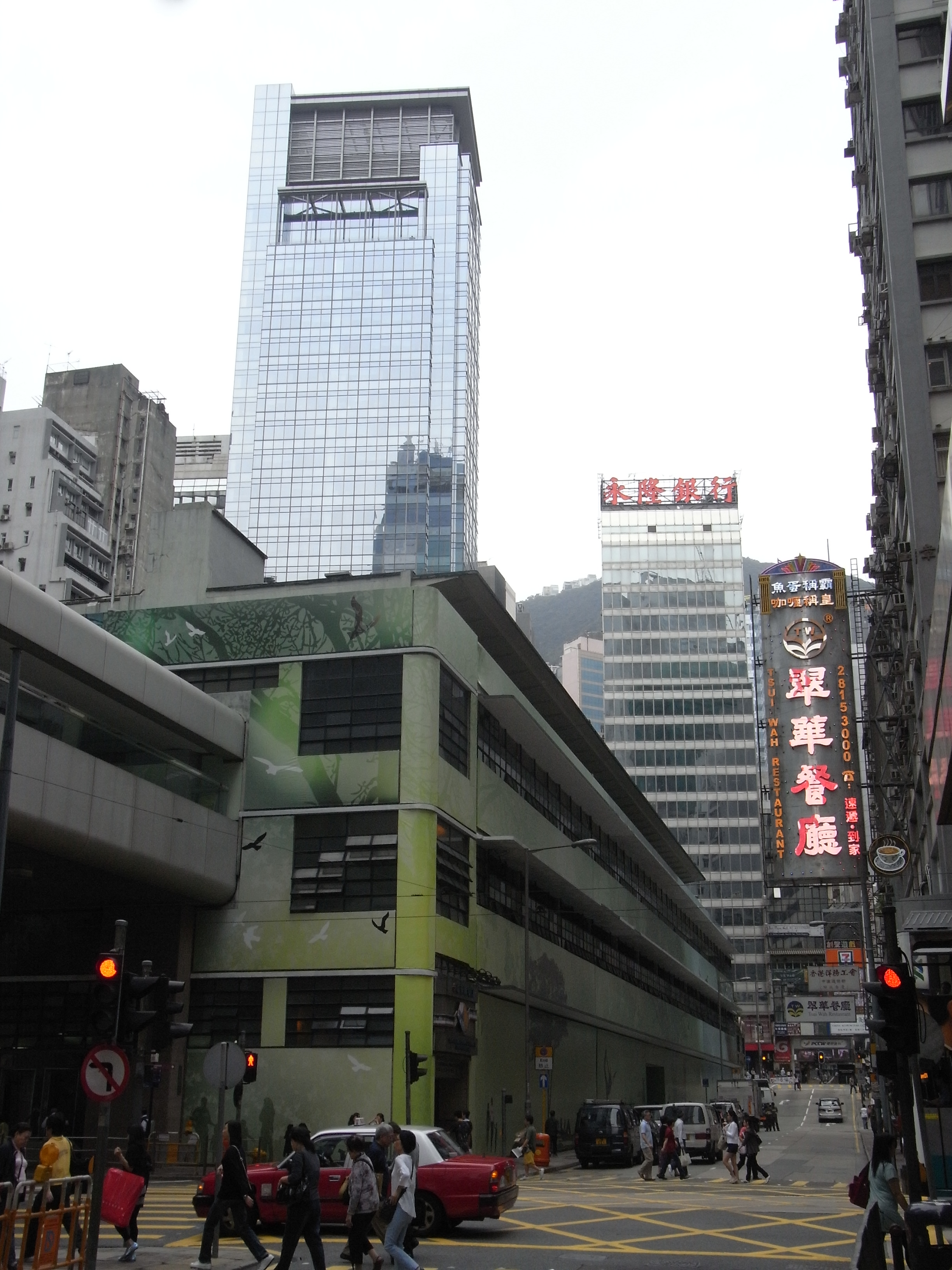
Central Market, on the corner of Des Voeux Road Central and Jubilee Street, Hong Kong.

Jubilee Street (Chinese: 租庇利街; Cantonese Yale: jou1 bei3 lei6 gaai1) is a historical main street with a length of approximately 190 metres (623 ft) in Central, Hong Kong Island. Jubilee Street was named for the 50th anniversary of Queen Victoria's reign in 1887.

== History ==
The street originally ran along the waterfront, and housed the United Pier, which was better known to locals as the Jubilee Street Pier, owing to its location. The pier was controversially demolished in 1994 following further land reclamation.

== Features ==
The street links Queen's Road Central, Des Voeux Road Central, and Connaught Road Central. Central Market and the headquarters of Hang Seng Bank are located there. One of the entrances to The Center is situated on Jubilee Street.
