= Tai Kok Tsui =

Tai Kok Tsui 大角咀
- Suburb
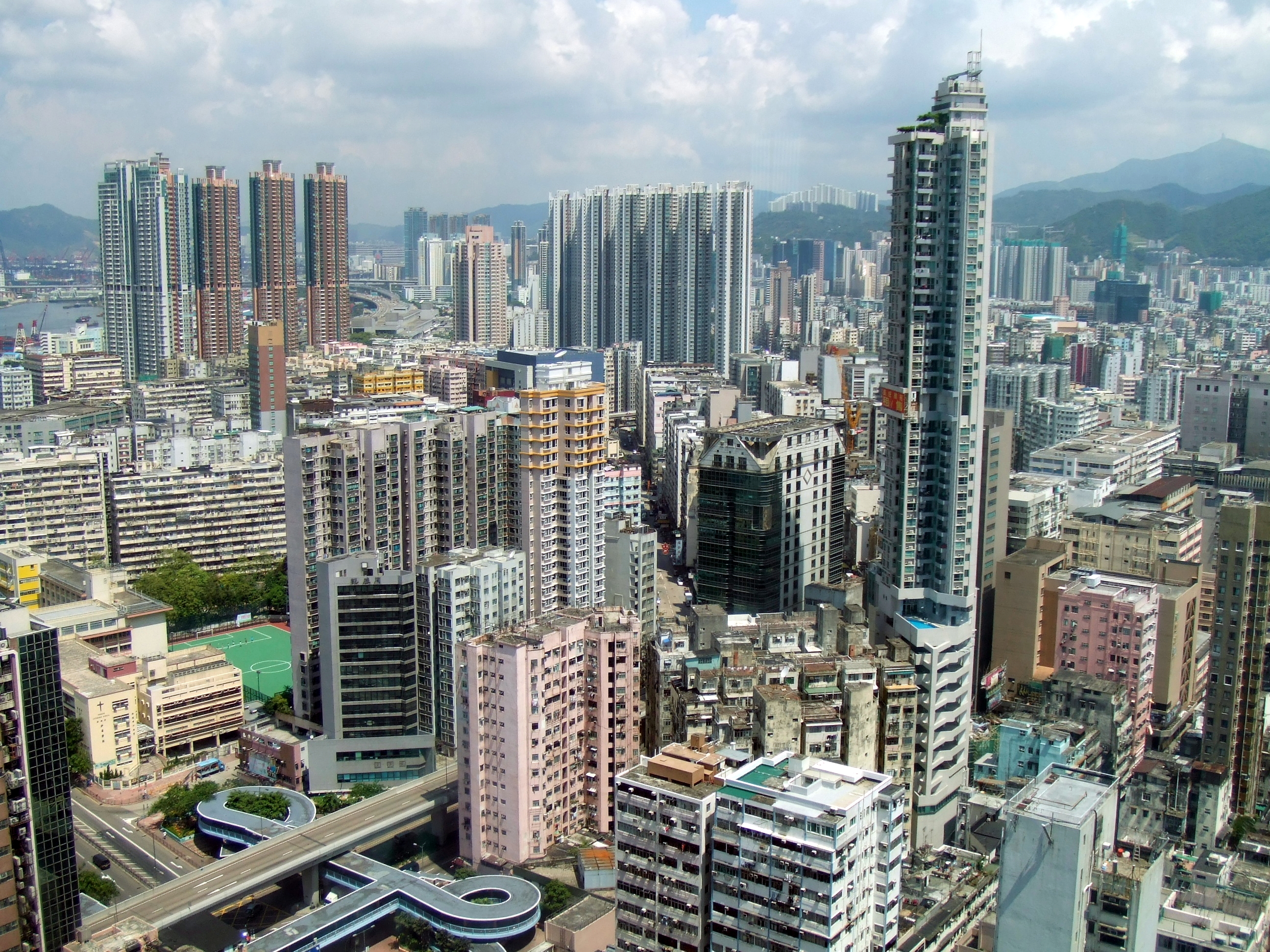
- Interactive map of Tai Kok Tsui
- Coordinates: 22°19′16.91″N 114°9′40.57″E
- Country: China
- SAR: Hong Kong
- District: Yau Tsim Mong

Population (2011)
  - Total: 33,350

Chinese name
- Traditional Chinese: 大角嘴 大角咀
- Simplified Chinese: 大角嘴 大角咀
- Cantonese Yale: Daaih gok dzéui
- Literal meaning: Big Corner Mouth
Transcriptions
Standard Mandarin
- Hanyu Pinyin: Dàjiǎozuǐ; Dàjiǎojǔ
- Bopomofo: ㄉㄚˋ ㄐㄧㄠˇ ㄗㄨㄟˇ
Yue: Cantonese
- Yale Romanization: Daaih gok dzéui
- Jyutping: Daai^{6} gok^{3} zeoi^{2}

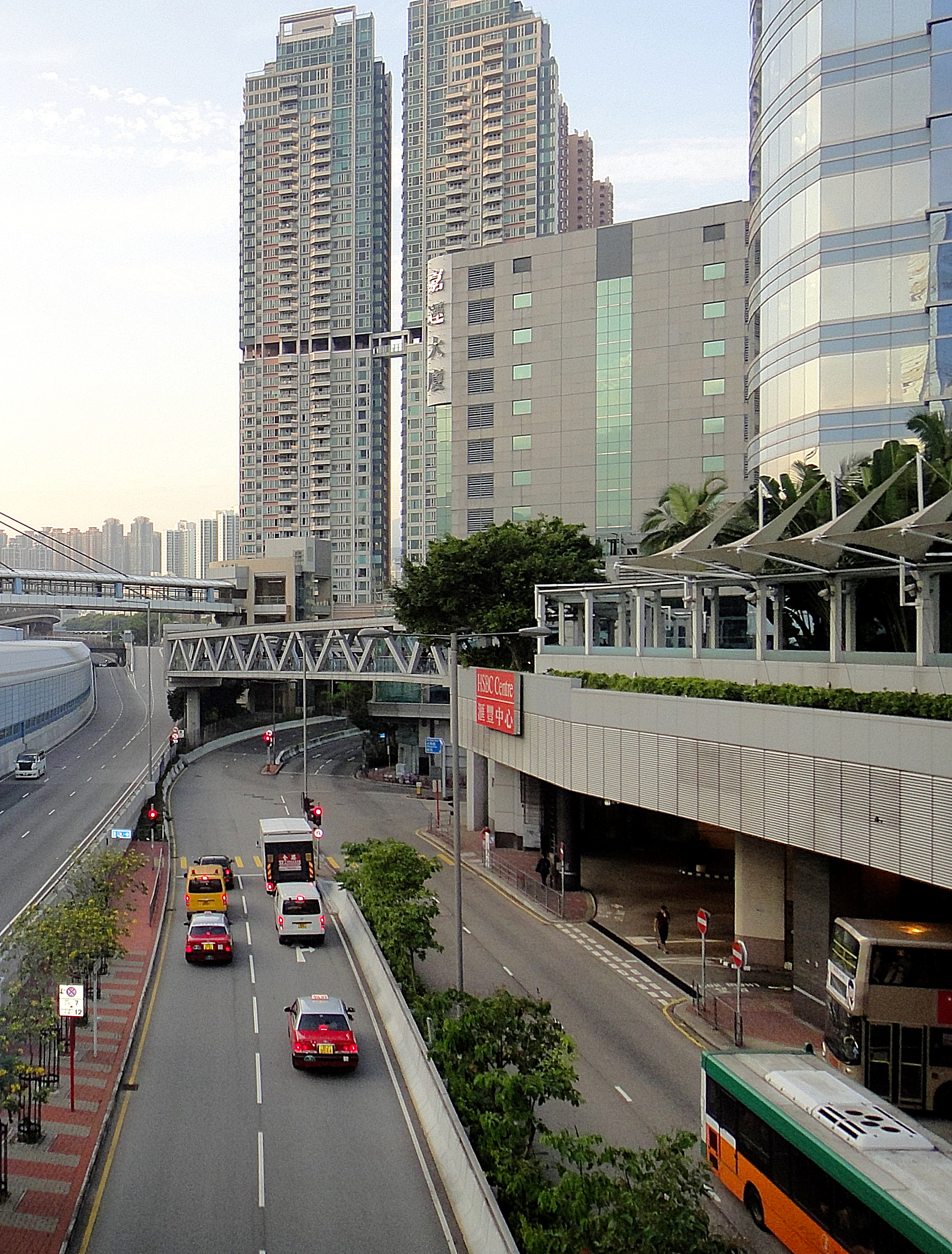
A view of Tai Kok Tsui

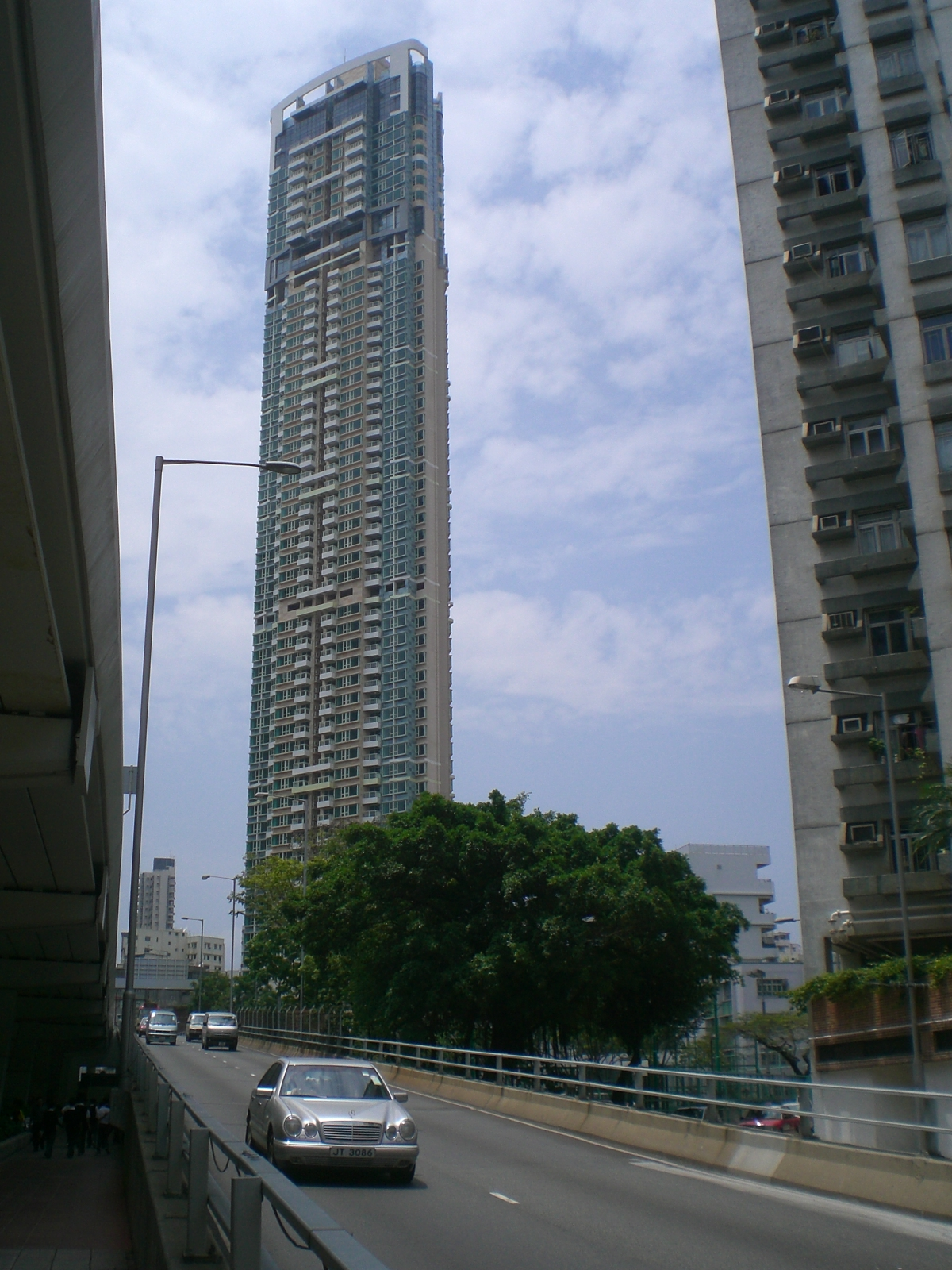
Shining Heights

Tai Kok Tsui is an area west of Mong Kok in Yau Tsim Mong district in the Kowloon region of Hong Kong. The mixed land use of industrial and residential is present in the old area. The Cosmopolitan Dock and oil depots were previously located there. Blocks of high-rise residential buildings have been erected on the reclaimed area to the west, which marked the revitalisation of the area with many restaurants and bars setting up shop. Many of the older residential buildings have been vacated and are set to be replaced by high-rise residential and commercial buildings.

== Demography ==
Until recently, many of the residents in Tai Kok Tsui were senior citizens but there has been a more recent influx of younger people, especially those returning to Hong Kong after time spent overseas. Traditionally the area has been known as one characterised by the presence of immigrants - often described as 'illegal immigrants' though this term is used rather intolerantly in Hong Kong and at times may describe people who are no such thing.

== History ==
Before any reclamation, Tai Kok Tsui was geographically a long island of Hong Kong of granite linked by an isthmus at its north to Kowloon Peninsula. The long granite hill divided the reclamation in its east and dock area in the west in 1924. The tip of the cape hosted the Asia oil tanks. The area was mainly for dock facilities at this period as reflected in present-day Anchor Street. The Cosmopolitan Dock survived till the 1960s which is now Cosmopolitan Estate (大同新邨).

The Guangzhou–Shenzhen–Hong Kong Express Rail Link was built underneath Tai Kok Tsui. In January 2010, the local residents protested and said the railway would cause unbearable noise pollution to residents in some districts and could cause a number of old buildings with poor foundations to collapse.

The Office for Safeguarding National Security of the CPG in the HKSAR plans to build its permanent office at Tai Kok Tsui.

== Coast and reclamation ==
The Chinese character Tsui (嘴) in Tai Kok Tsui implies that the area was originally an elongated cape on the west side of Kowloon Peninsula. The cove between the cape and Kowloon Peninsula was reclaimed during the period of 1867–1904. More reclamation along its shore took place during the period of 1904–1924 and more covered its tip during the period of 1924–1945. Minor reclamation was needed during the period 1964–1982 when the Tai Kok Tsui Ferry Pier (大角嘴碼頭) was built. The launch of the Airport Core Programme in the 1990s gave rise to substantial reclamation as well as revitalisation of the district. Part of Tai Kok Tsui - the area newly reclaimed in the 1990s - is increasingly referred to as Olympic due to the nearby MTR station opened in 1998, and the Olympian City shopping centre.

== Housing ==
=== Island Harborview ===
Island Harbourview (Chinese: 維港灣), completed in 1999, was the first private housing estate to be built in the newly reclaimed area, it is located next to Olympian City 1. There are 9 blocks in total which form an 'L' shape. Blocks 1, 2, 3, 5 and 6 faces east–west while blocks 7, 8, 9 and 10 face north–south. The estate has a clubhouse with many facilities such as a swimming pool and two badminton courts. It is located at 11 Hoi Fai Road, Tai Kok Tsui, but its car entrance is at Hoi Fan Road (near the intersection with Hoi Fai Road).

=== Florient Rise ===
Florient Rise (Chinese: 海桃灣), formerly Cherry Street Project (櫻桃街項目; jing1 tou4 gaai1 hong6 muk6) is a private estate in Cherry Street. It was jointly developed by Nan Fung Group and Urban Renewal Authority (URA) in 2008, and construction was completed in May 2009. It comprises three blocks with a total of 522 units.

There is a residential block called "Hoi Ming Court" in the middle of the site which was excluded from the redevelopment project due to its young age and high acquisition cost. Florient Rise was built around Hoi Ming Court.

=== Harbour Green ===
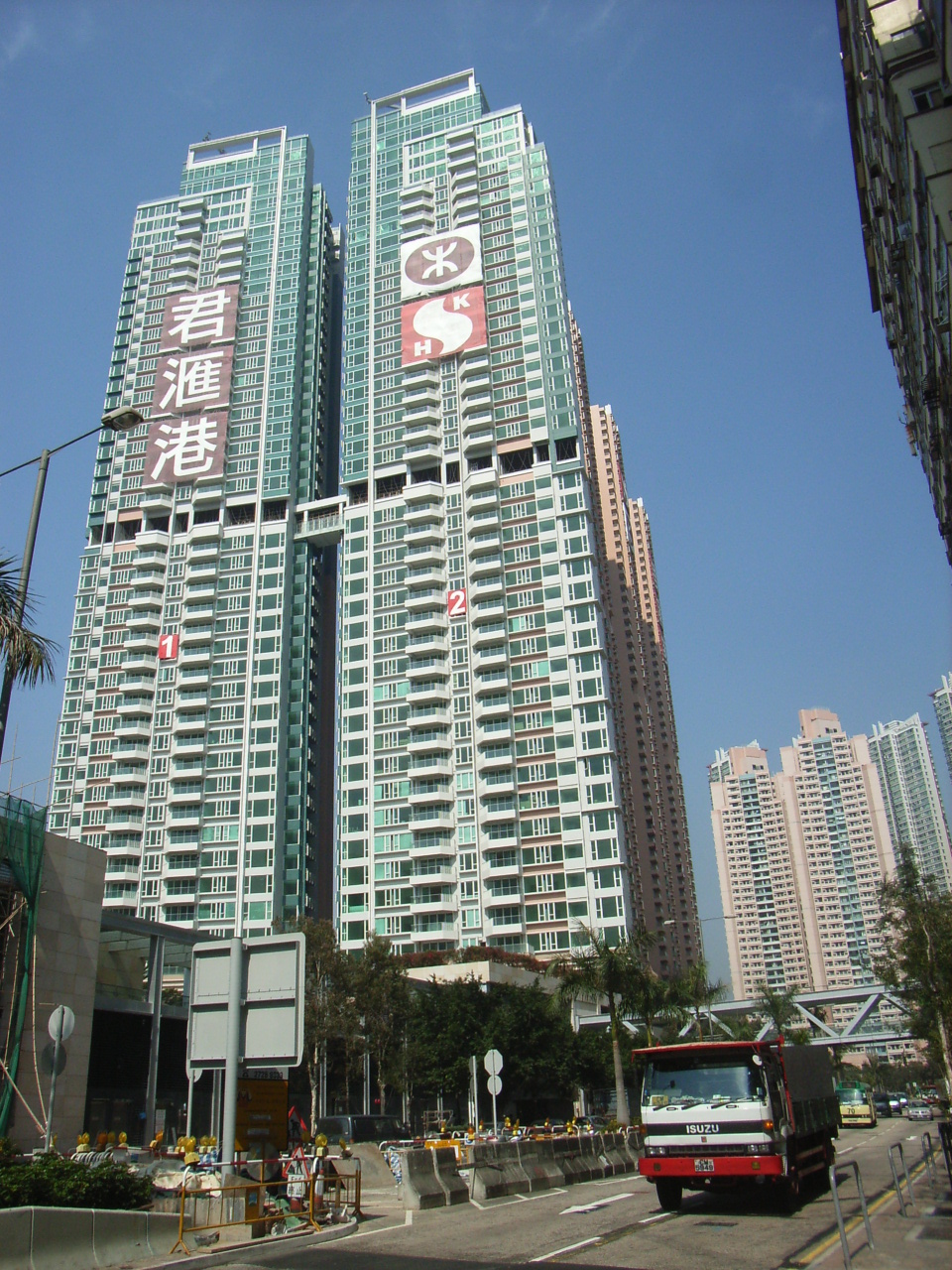
Harbour Green

Harbour Green (Chinese: 君滙港) is a private estate and part of the Olympic station Phase III project. It comprises five 48 or 56 floors towers with a total of 1,514 units. It was jointly developed by Sun Hung Kai Properties and MTR Corporation and completed in 2007.

Harbour Green is in Primary One Admission (POA) School Net 32. Within the school net are multiple aided schools (operated independently but funded with government money) and Tong Mei Road Government Primary School (塘尾道官立小學).

=== One Silversea ===
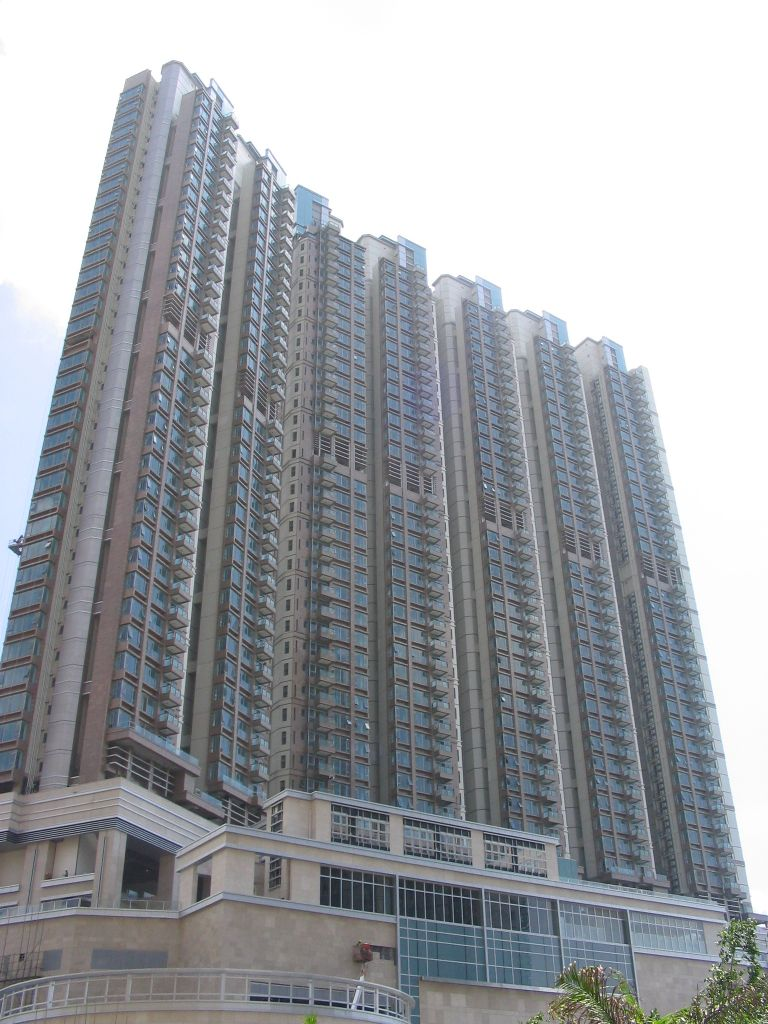
One Silversea

One Silversea (Chinese: 一號銀海) is a private estate located at the waterfront site of the former Tai Kok Tsui Temporary Bus Terminus, it was developed by Sino Land and completed in 2006.

=== Shining Heights ===
Shining Heights (Chinese: 亮賢居), at 83 Sycamore Street, was developed by Hong Kong Ferry (Holdings) Company Limited and its parent company, Henderson Land Development. It was formerly Hong Kong Ferry Staff Quarters It comprises one tower with a total of 348 units, which was completed in 2009.

=== The Hermitage ===
The Hermitage (Chinese: 帝峯 · 皇殿) is a private estate located above the newly developed Olympian City 3 with 6 towers. Towers 1-3 are the 19th tallest building in Hong Kong.

The Hermitage is in Primary One Admission (POA) School Net 31. Within the school net are multiple aided schools (operated independently but funded with government money) and Jordan Road Government Primary School.

=== Hampton Place ===
Hampton Place (Chinese: 凱帆軒) is a private estate located at No 11 Hoi Fan Road and Olympic station, which was developed by Cheung Kong Holdings and completed in 2003. It is composed of 3 blocks. The estate has a clubhouse with many facilities such as a swimming pool, spa, fishing area, BBQ, and cinema. There is also a 3-storey carpark. A 3-storey commercial building was later built and now accommodates a kindergarten and a medical centre.

== Education ==
- HKMA David Li Kwok Po College
- Sir Ellis Kadoorie Secondary School
- PLK Vicwood KT Chong Sixth Form College
- St. Francis Xavier's College, Tai Kok Tsui
- Lau Wong Fat Secondary School
- CCC Ming Kei College

Tai Kok Tsui is in Primary One Admission (POA) School Net 32. Within the school net are multiple aided schools (operated independently but funded with government money) and Tong Mei Road Government Primary School (塘尾道官立小學).

Hong Kong Public Libraries operates Tai Kok Tsui Public Library in the Tai Kok Tsui Municipal Services Building.

== Transport ==
MTR's Olympic station serves the area. It is also served by numerous bus routes.

== See also ==
- Hung Shing Temple, Tai Kok Tsui
