= Yaumatei Ferry Pier =

Former pier in Hong Kong

Yaumatei Ferry Pier (Chinese: 油麻地碼頭), also known as Public Square Street Ferry Pier (Chinese: 公眾四方街碼頭) (1924–1933) was a ferry pier at the junction of Public Square Street and Ferry Street (now Prosperous Garden) in Yau Ma Tei, Kowloon, Hong Kong. The seaside outside Ferry Street is now reclaimed.

Another pier, at the other end of the company's main route, in Central, was known as HYF pier, for 'Hong Kong and Yaumatei Ferry'.

== History ==
After attaining the license in 1923, the Hong Kong and Yaumati Ferry Company began service between Yau Ma Tei and Central on 1 January 1924 between Yaumatei Ferry Pier and Queen's Pier. In 1933, the Ferry Company developed its vehicular ferry service, but the pier was too small for vehicular ferries. Thus the ferry service at the pier was moved to the larger Jordan Road Ferry Pier in the west of Jordan. The original Yaumatei Pier was closed down, and later re-opened for public use.

== See also ==
- List of demolished piers in Hong Kong
