= City Hall Ferry Pier =

Former pier in Hong Kong

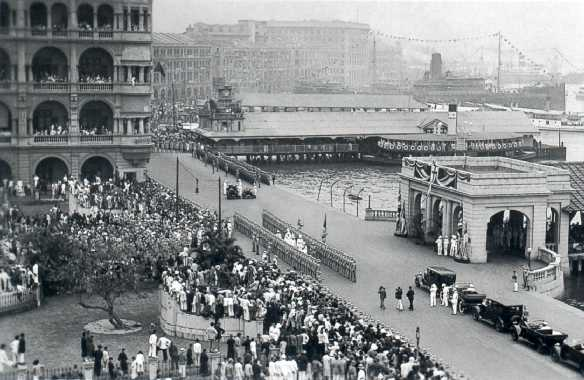
- 1925, from left to right: Queen's Building, Royal Square (now Statue Square), Pedder Pier
- Traditional Chinese: 大會堂碼頭
- Simplified Chinese: 大会堂码头
- Cantonese Yale: Daaihwuihtòhng máhtàuh
- Literal meaning: Grand Hall Pier
Transcriptions
Standard Mandarin
- Hanyu Pinyin: Dàhuìtáng mǎtóu
- Wade–Giles: Ta^{4}-hui^{4}-t‘ang^{2} ma^{3}-t‘ou^{2}
- IPA: [tâ.xwêɪ.tʰǎŋ mà.tʰǒʊ]
Yue: Cantonese
- Yale Romanization: Daaihwuihtòhng máhtàuh
- Jyutping: daai6 wui6 tong4 maa5 tau4
- IPA: [taj˨.wuj˨.tʰɔŋ˩ ma˩˧.tʰɐw˩]

City Hall Ferry Pier (Chinese: 大會堂碼頭) was a barge pier at the east of ex-Queen's Pier outside Hong Kong City Hall, Edinburgh Place, Central, Hong Kong. It had hydrofoil service to Tsim Sha Tsui East. Due to the Central and Wan Chai Reclamation, both Queen's Pier and City Hall Ferry Pier were closed and relocated to Central Piers No.7 and 8 (Star Ferry Pier) on 11 November 2006.
