= New Lucky House =

Building in Jordan, Kowloon, Hong Kong

- 華豐大廈
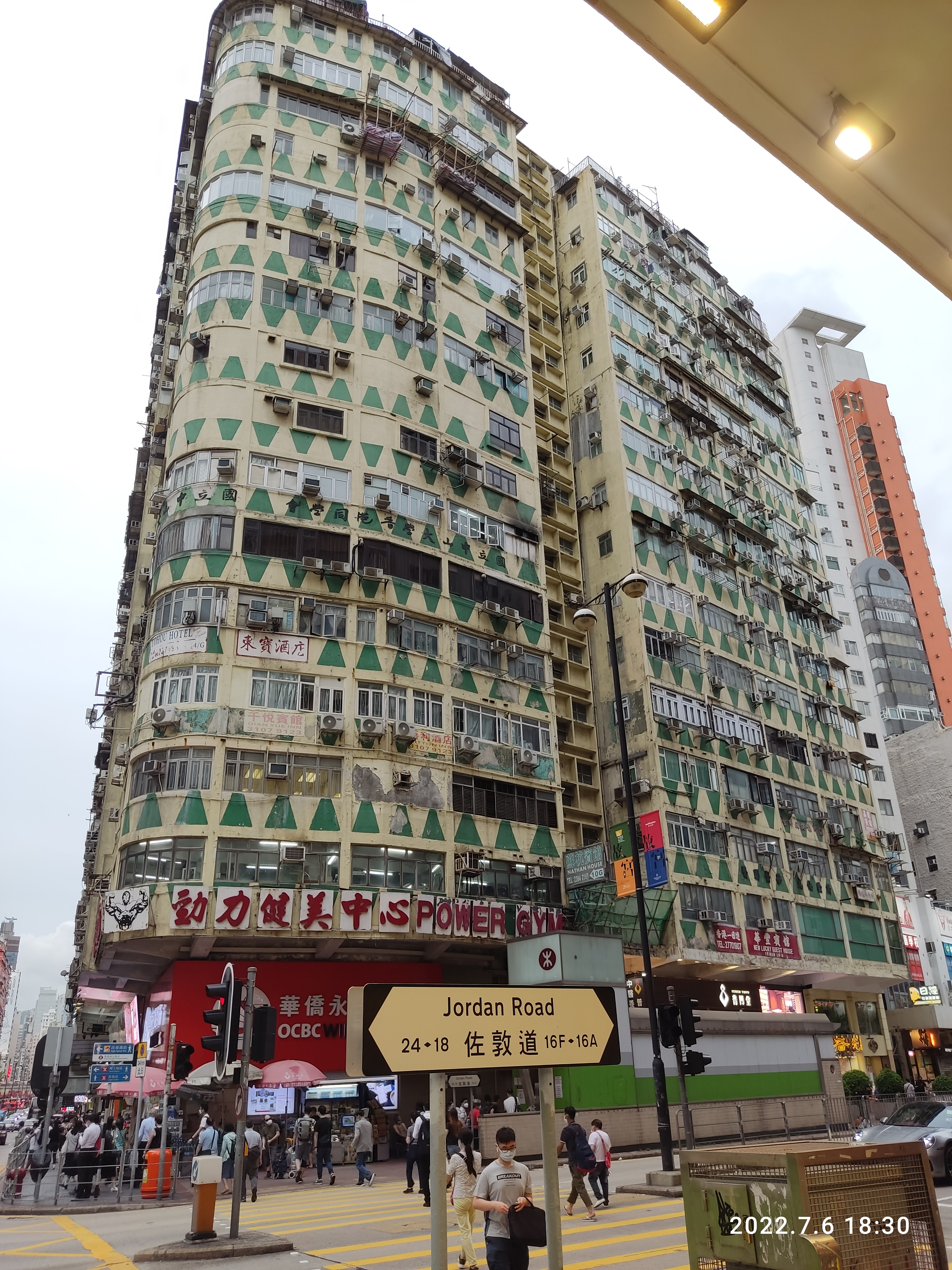
- New Lucky House in 2022, viewed across Jordan Road
- Interactive map of the New Lucky House area

General information
- Location: 298-306 Nathan Road; 13-15 Jordan Road
- Coordinates: 22°18′21″N 114°10′19″E
- Year built: 3 April 1964

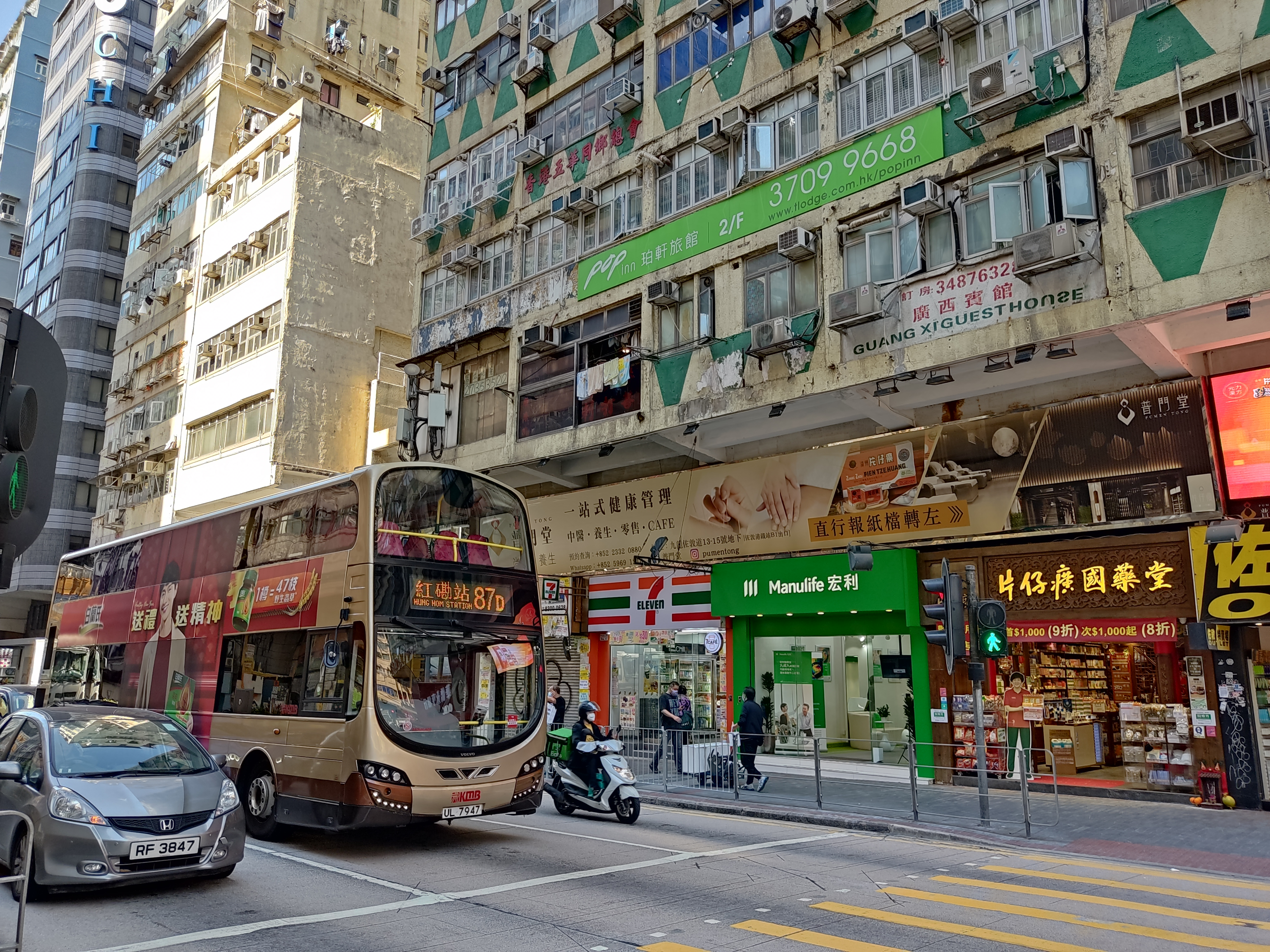
Street level view of New Lucky House along Nathan Road in 2022

New Lucky House (Chinese: 華豐大廈; Jyutping: Waa4 Fung1 daai6 haa6) is a composite building, including residential and commercial spaces, located in Jordan, Kowloon, Hong Kong, at the corner of Nathan Road and Jordan Road.

== History ==
Constructed in 3 April 1964, the 16-storey building has 200 units and 35 guest houses.

=== 2024 fire ===
A fire broke out on April 10, 2024, killing five people. Forty people were injured, five critically. It started at a gym which was located on the building's first floor, according to early reports. The fire brigade rescued people using a ladder while people were waving out of the windows. Despite the damage, there was no concern about the overall structure of the building.

== Transportation ==
Exit B1 of the Jordan station of the MTR is located next to the building.

== See also ==
- Garley Building fire
