= Nathan Road =

Main thoroughfare in Kowloon, Hong Kong

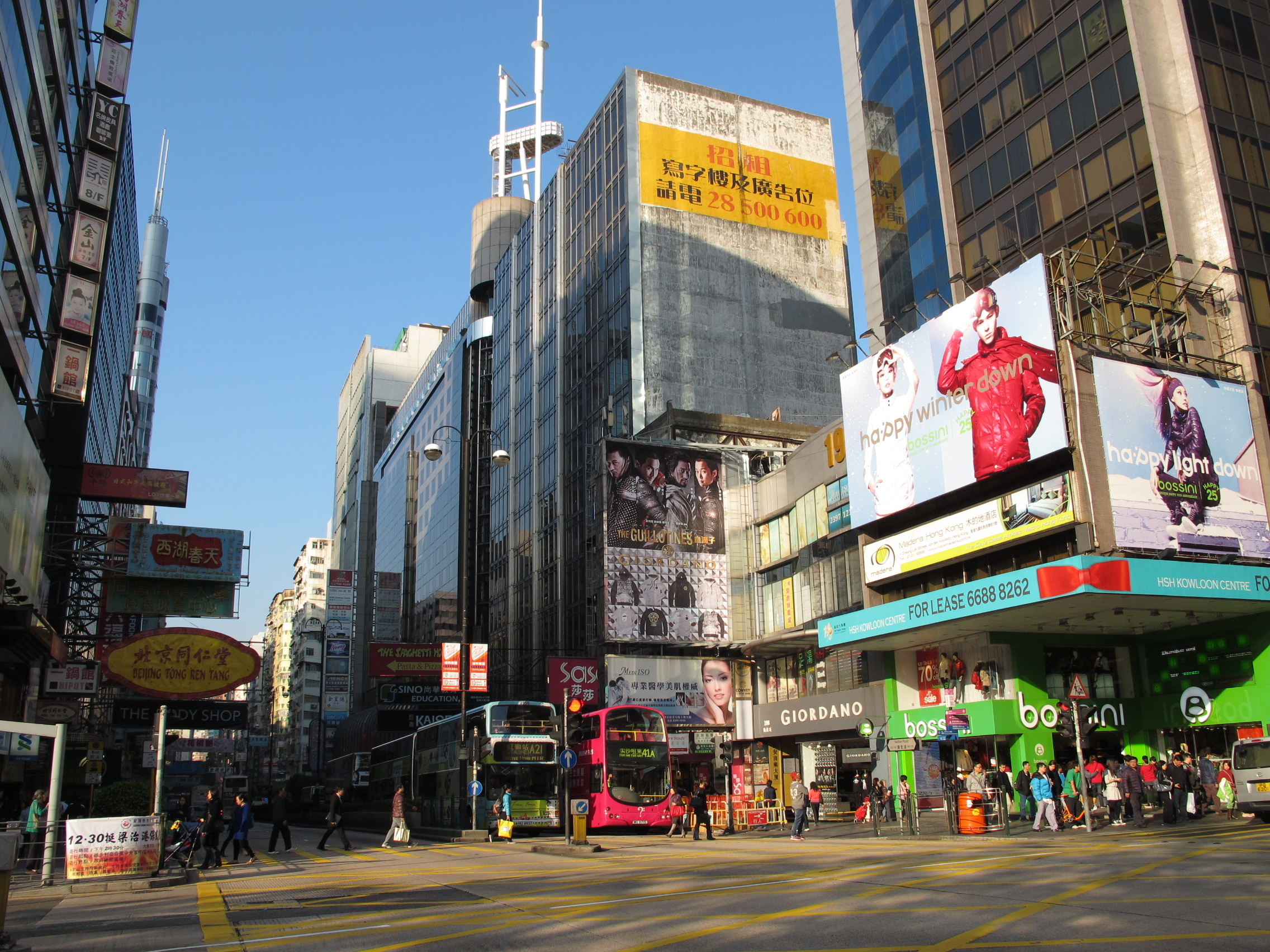
- Jordan section of Nathan Road, at its intersection with Austin Road
- Interactive map of Nathan Road
- Native name: 彌敦道
- Former names: Robinson Road, Katori-dori (during Japanese Occupation, 1942-1945)
- Namesake: Sir Matthew Nathan
- Location: Kowloon, Hong Kong
- Coordinates: 22°18′36″N 114°10′16″E
- South end: Salisbury Road
- North end: Boundary Street

Nathan Road 彌敦道
- Traditional Chinese: 彌敦道
- Simplified Chinese: 弥敦道
Transcriptions
Standard Mandarin
- Hanyu Pinyin: Mídūn Dào
Hakka
- Romanization: ni2 dun1 tau4
Yue: Cantonese
- Yale Romanization: nei4 deun1 dou6
- Jyutping: nei4 deon1 dou6
- IPA: [nȅi tɵ́n tòu]

Nathan Road (Chinese: 彌敦道) is the main thoroughfare in Kowloon, Hong Kong, aligned south–north from Tsim Sha Tsui to Sham Shui Po. It is lined with shops and restaurants and throngs with visitors, and was known in the post–World War II years as the Golden Mile, a name that is now rarely used. It starts on the southern part of Kowloon at its junction with Salisbury Road, a few metres north of Victoria Harbour, and ends at its intersection with Boundary Street in the north. Portions of the Kwun Tong and Tsuen Wan lines (Prince Edward, Mong Kok, Yau Ma Tei, Jordan and Tsim Sha Tsui) run underneath Nathan Road. The total length of Nathan Road is about 3.6 km (2.2 mi).

== History ==
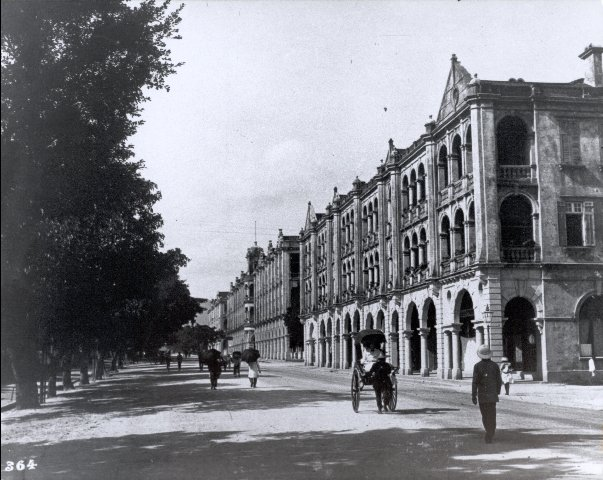
Nathan Road in the 1920s (Cameron Road on right)

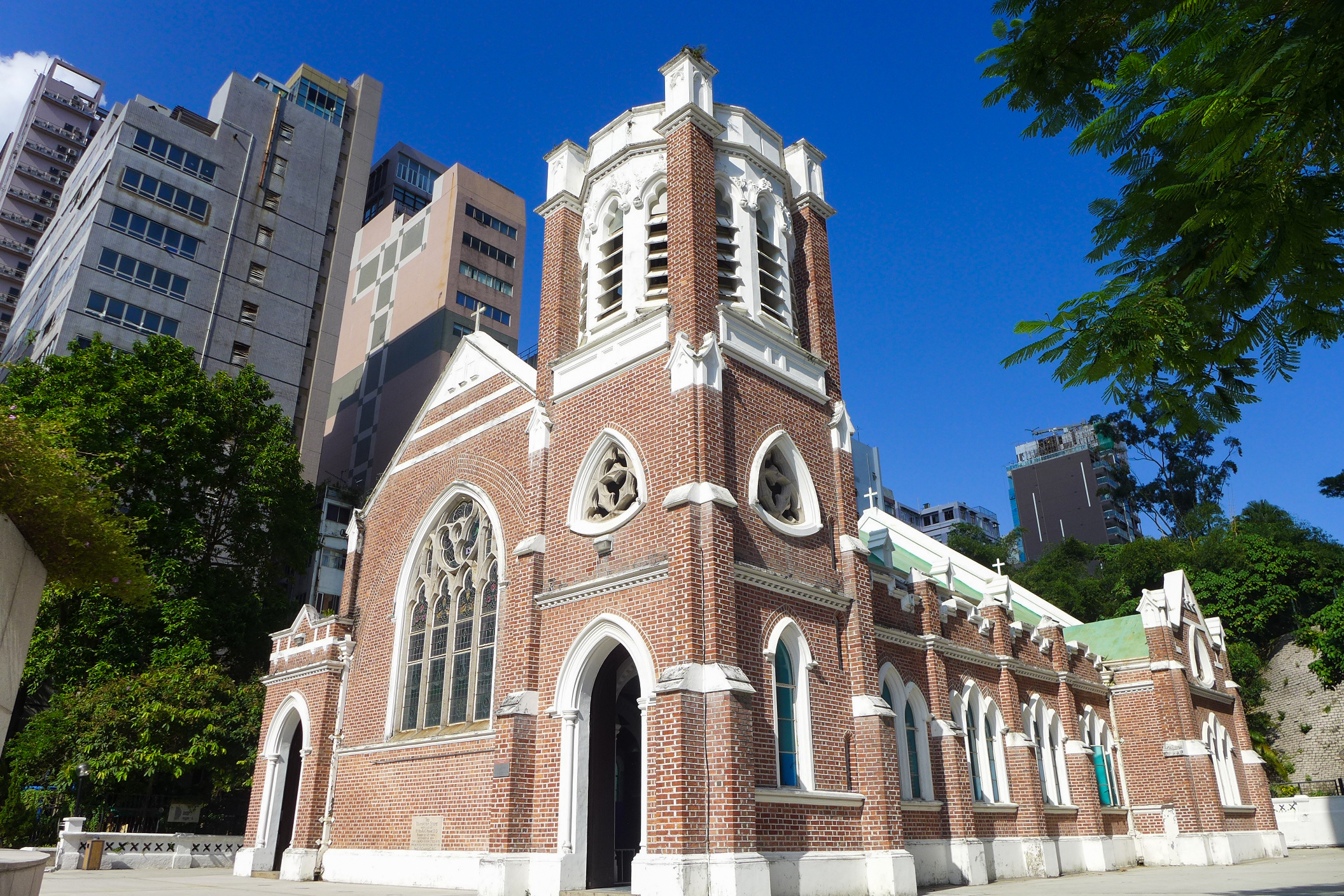
Saint Andrew's Church

The first section of the road was completed in 1861. It was the first road built in Kowloon, after the land was ceded by the Qing dynasty government to the United Kingdom and made part of the crown colony in 1860. The road was originally named Robinson Road, after Sir Hercules Robinson, the 5th governor of Hong Kong. To avoid confusion with the Robinson Road on Hong Kong Island, the name was changed to Nathan Road in 1909, after Sir Matthew Nathan, the 13th governor who served between 1904 and 1907.

The road started at Mody Road in Tsim Sha Tsui, ending northward at Austin Road. When Sha Tsui Wan was reclaimed in the late 1800s, Salisbury Road was extended east, and Nathan Road was extended south to meet it. Nathan was extended northward in the 1920s. The section of the road from Gascoigne Road to Argyle Street was originally named Coronation Road (加冕道), in honour of the coronation of King George V in 1911. The road was renamed as part of Nathan Road in 1926, after works joining the road and Nathan Road was completed. The section of Tai Po Road south of Boundary Street was also renamed as part of the road.

The early Nathan Road was largely residential, with colonial-style houses with arched verandahs and covered archways. It was home to the Whitfield Barracks, which later became Kowloon Park. Saint Andrew's Church, the oldest Anglican church in Kowloon, has been located there since its completion in 1906.

In 1996, the Garley Building fire broke out, killing 41 people. In 2008, the Cornwall Court fire broke out, involving more than 200 firefighters, killing 4 people, including 2 fire fighters.

== Landmarks ==
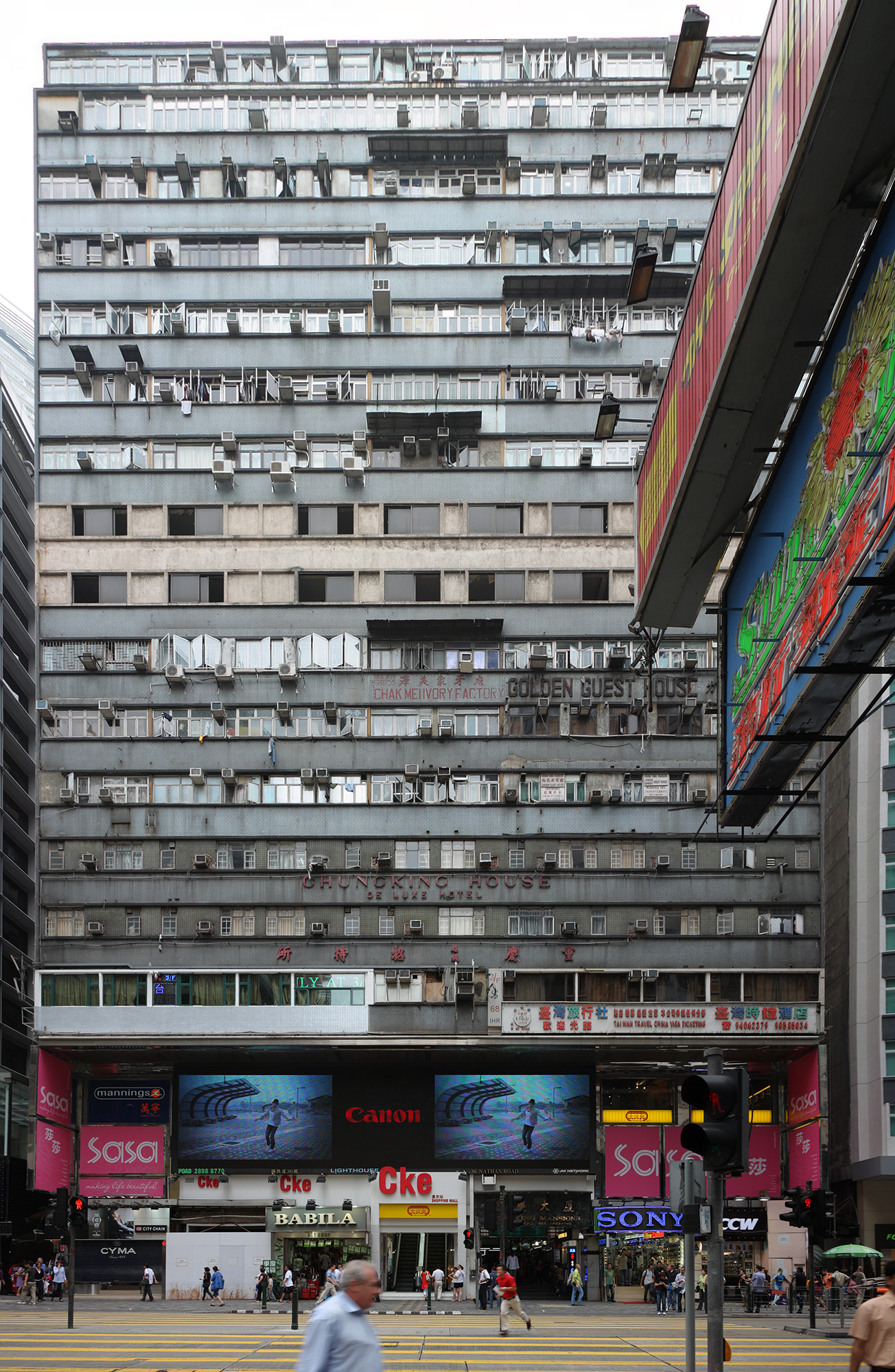
Chungking Mansions

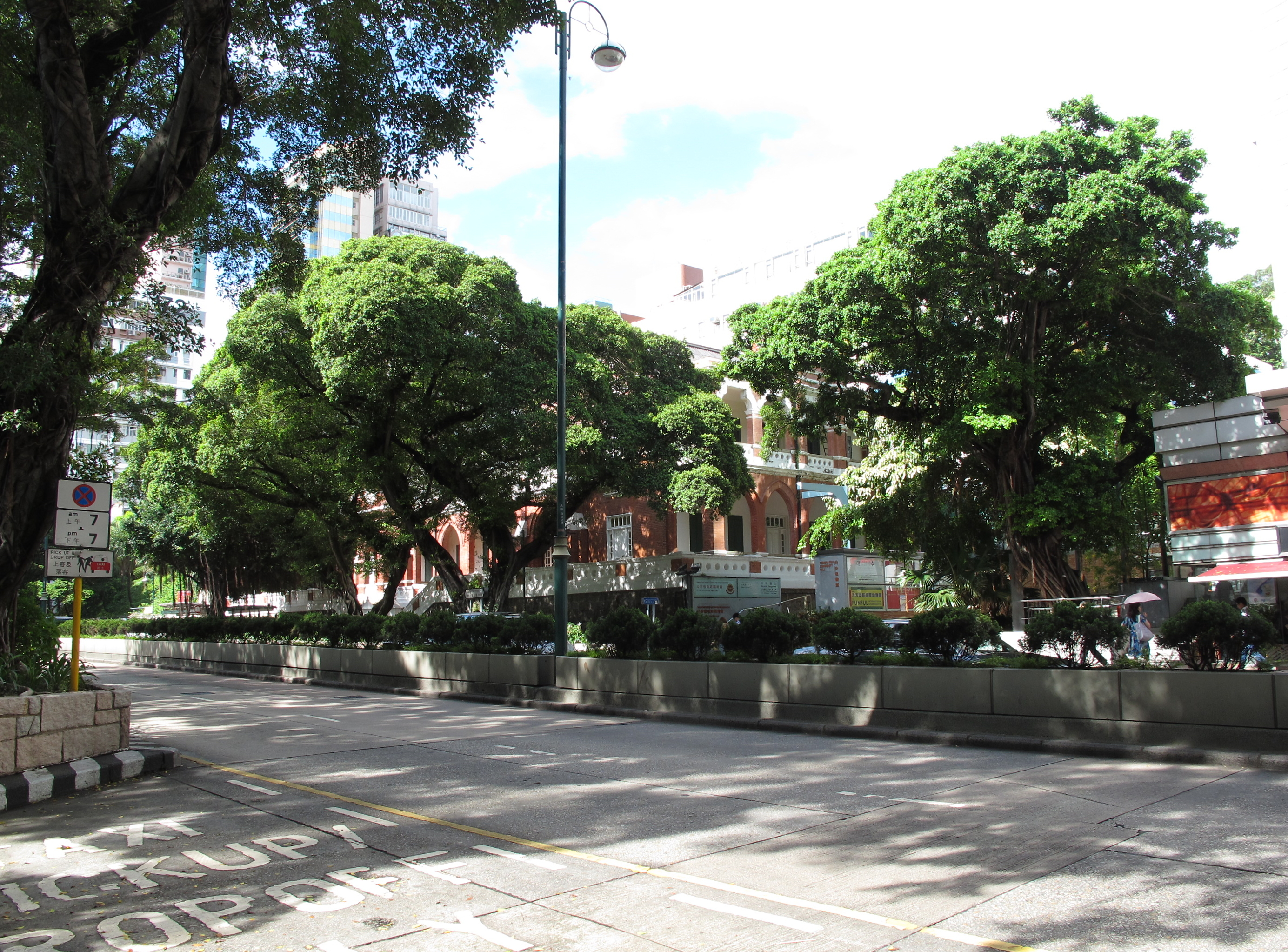
The old trees along the former Kowloon British School

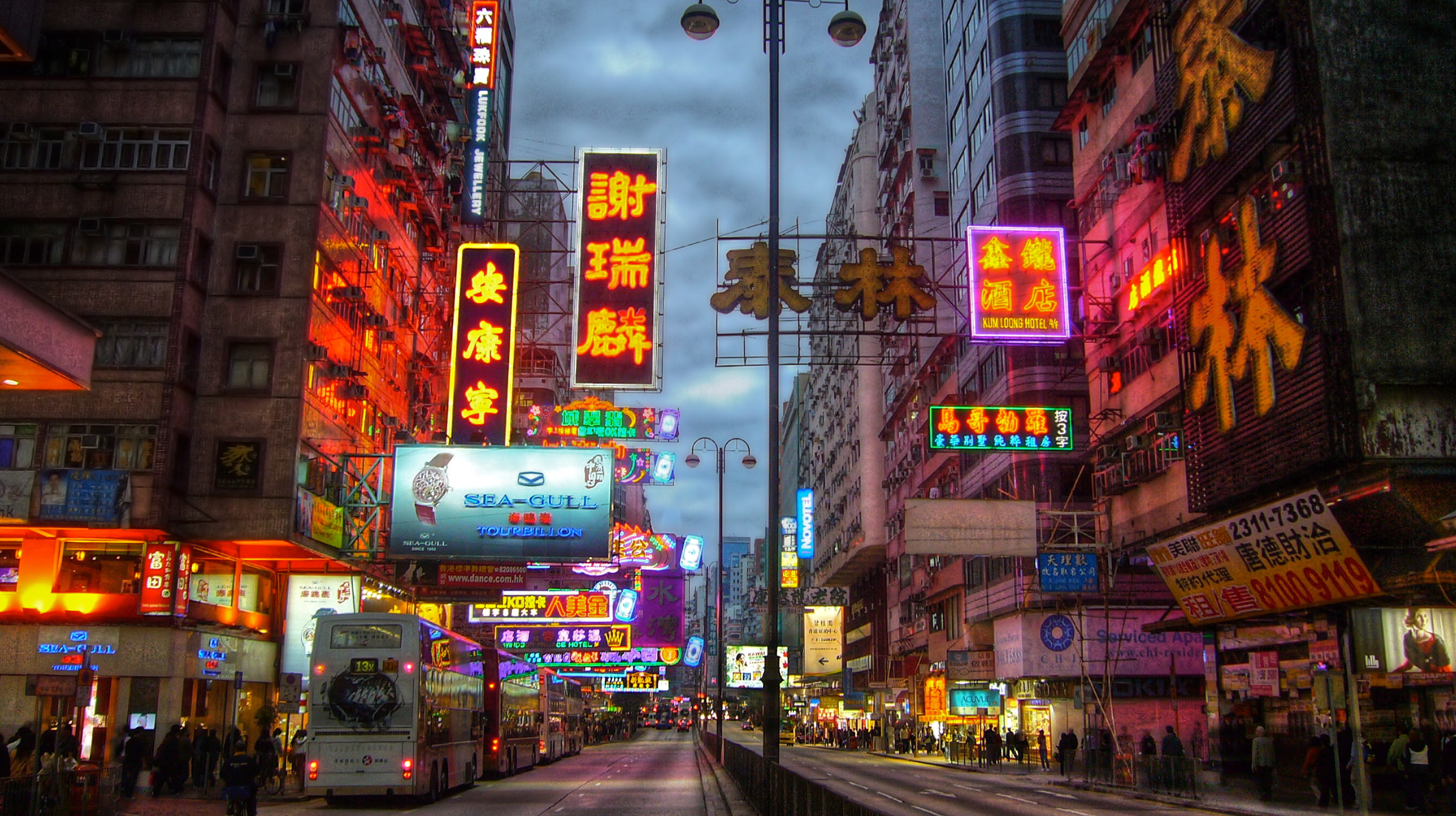
Nathan Road, Jordan section.

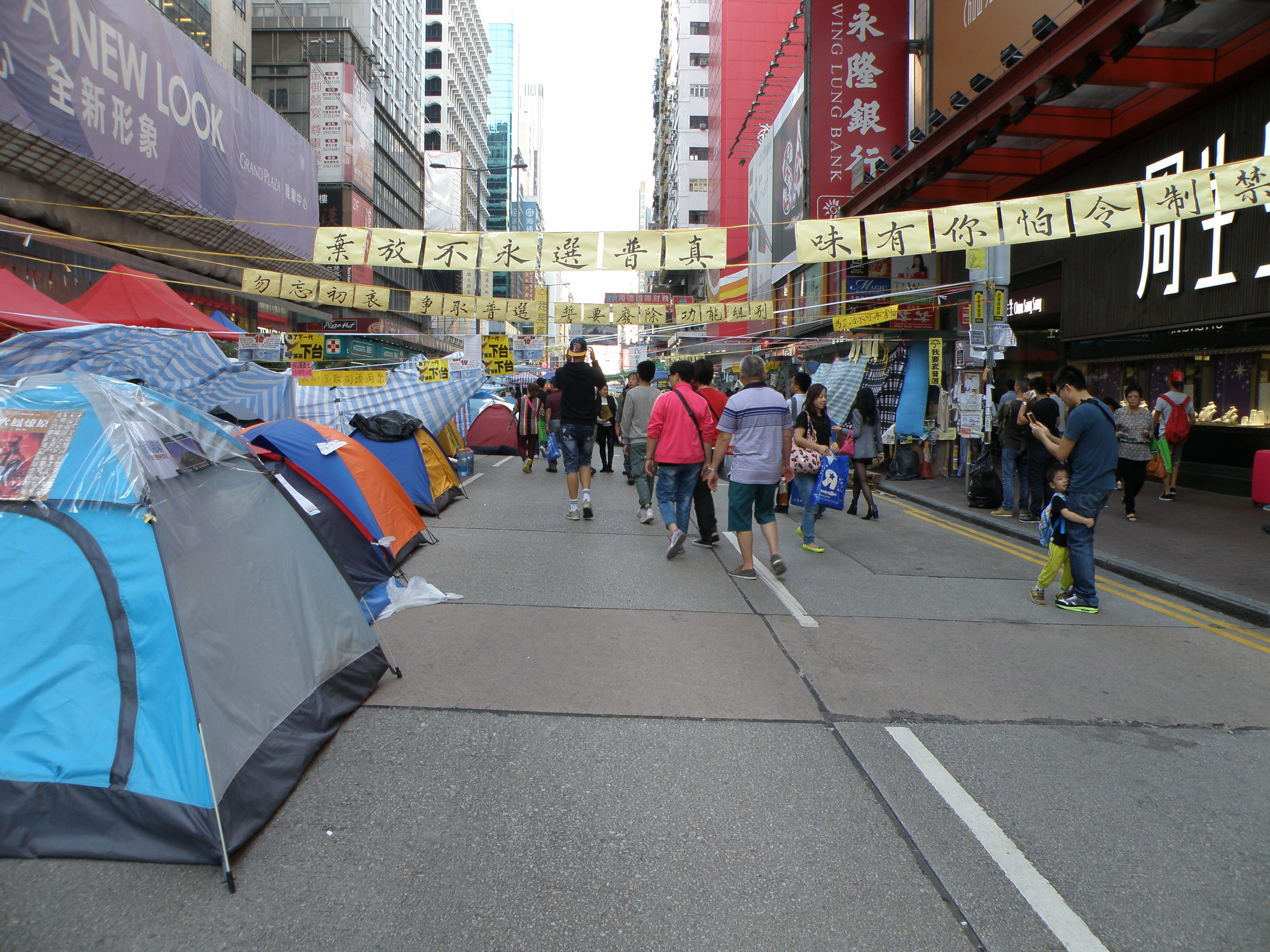
Nathan Road Mong Kok Section during the 2014 Umbrella Movement

- The Peninsula Hotel (corner of Salisbury Road and the southern end of Nathan Road)
- 26 Nathan Road (#26)
- Chungking Mansions (#36–44)
- iSQUARE (#63)
- Kowloon Park
- Park Lane Shopper's Boulevard
- The ONE, at the location of the former Tung Ying Building (#100)
- Kowloon Masjid and Islamic Centre (#105)
- The Mira Hong Kong (#118)
- Miramar Shopping Centre (#132–134)
- Former Kowloon British School (#136). Now houses the Antiquities and Monuments Office
- St Andrew's Church, Kowloon (#138)
- Po On Commercial Building (#198)
- Fourseas Building (#208–212)
- Yau Tsim District Police Headquarters and Tsim Sha Tsui Police Station (#213)
- Shamrock Hotel (#223)
- Garley Building (#233–239, destroyed by fire in 1996)
- New Lucky House (#300-306)
- Manulife Provident Funds Place (also known as Wing On Kowloon Center, #345)
- Novotel Nathan Road Kowloon Hong Kong (#348)
- Hang Shing Building (#363–373)
- Eaton Hotel Hong Kong (#380)
- Alhambra Building (#383–389)
- Kowloon Central Post Office (#405)
- Chak Fung House (#440–442A)
- Yun Kai Building (#466–472)
- Sunbeam Commercial Building (#469–471)
- Oxford Commercial Building (#494–496)
- Nathan Tower (#518–520)
- Mongkok Building (#546)
- Full Win Commercial Centre (#573)
- Sino Centre (#582–592)
- Hollywood Plaza Mongkok (#610)
- Good Hope Building (#612–618)
- Bank Centre Mall (#636)
- Wu Sang House (#655)
- HSBC Building Mongkok (#673)
- Cornwall Court (#687–689). Site of the 2008 Cornwall Court fire.
- Belgian Bank Building (#721–725)
- Golden Plaza (#745–747)
- Newish Mansion (#763–767)
- Union Park Centre (#771–775)

== Public transport ==
Five stations of the Mass Transit Railway (MTR) are built directly underneath Nathan Road, where the Tsuen Wan Line runs parallel with. These stations are, from north to south:

- Prince Edward station in Mong Kok, at the intersection between Nathan Road and Prince Edward Road West
- Mong Kok station (or Argyle station) in Mong Kok, at the intersection between Nathan Road and Argyle Street
- Yau Ma Tei station (or Waterloo station) in Yau Ma Tei, at the intersection between Nathan Road and Waterloo Road
- Jordan station in Jordan, at the intersection between Nathan Road and Jordan Road
- Tsim Sha Tsui station in Tsim Sha Tsui, at the intersection between Nathan Road and Carnarvon Road

The road is heavily trafficked by numerous bus routes, such as buses 1, 1A, 2, 3C, 6, 203E, 270A among many others. Many bus stops line the road.

== Gallery ==
Nathan Road, Hong Kong

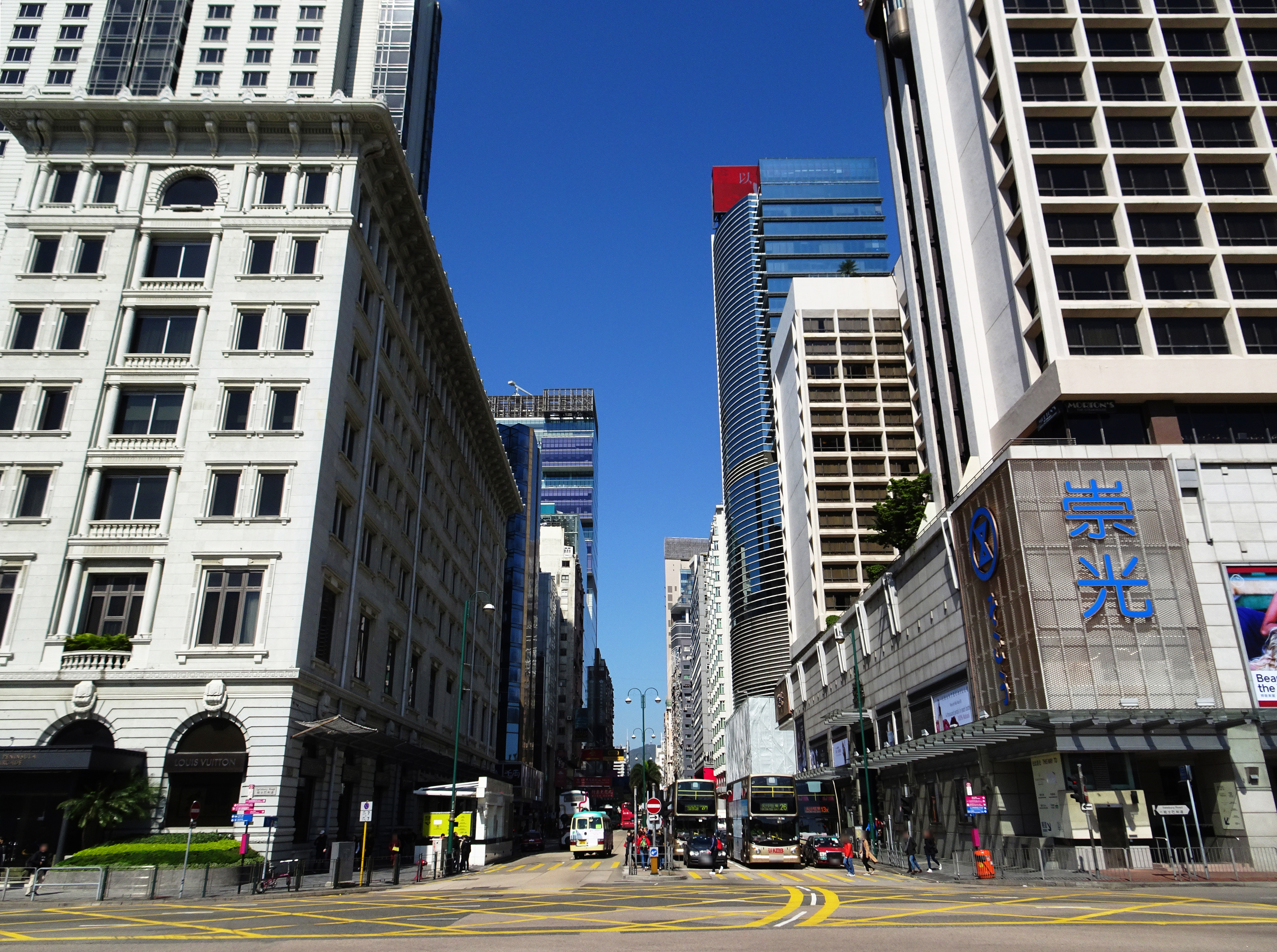
The southern end section of Nathan Road

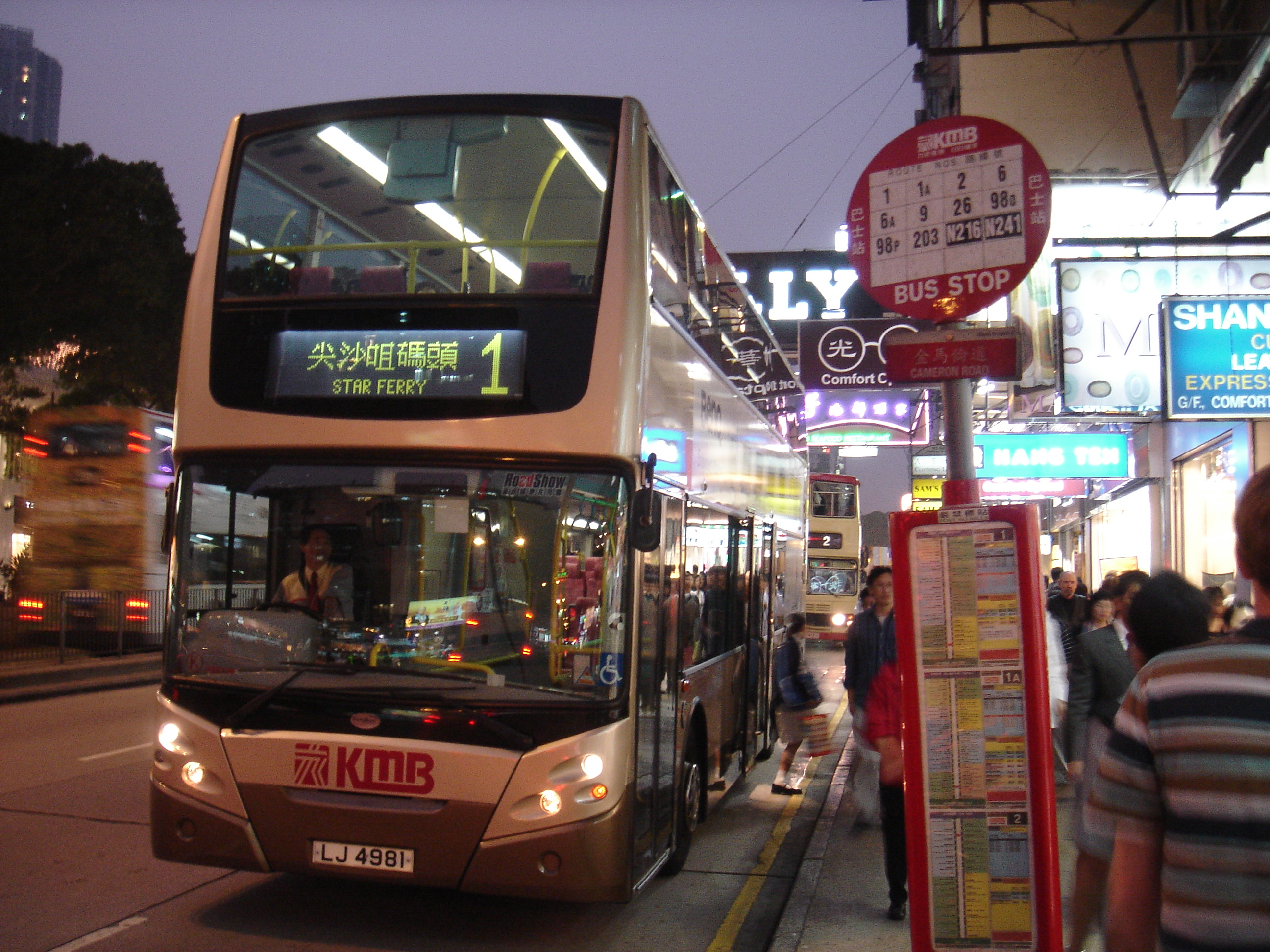
KMB Enviro500 serving Route 1 on Nathan Road, Tsim Sha Tsui.

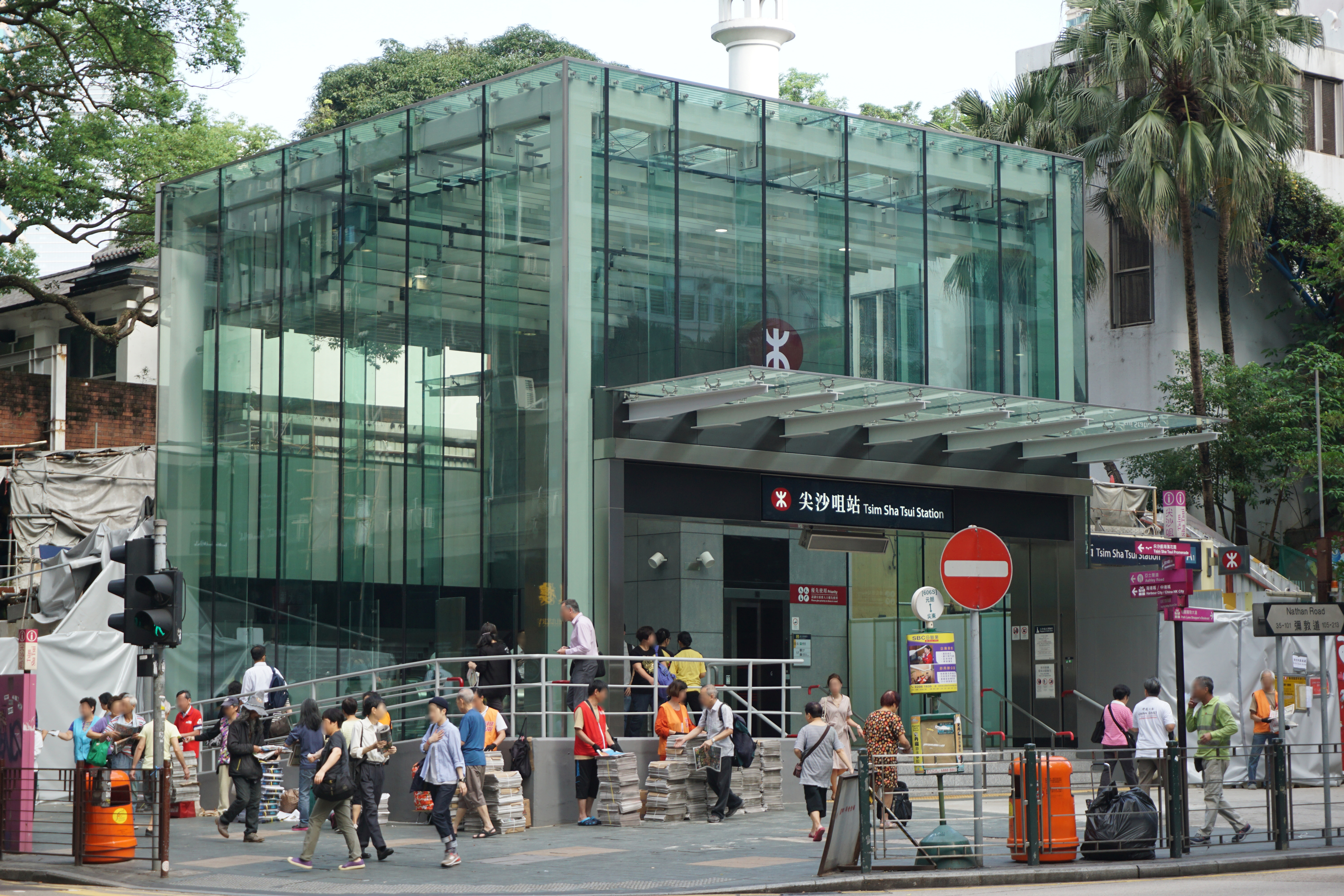
Exit A1 of Tsim Sha Tsui station on Nathan Road.

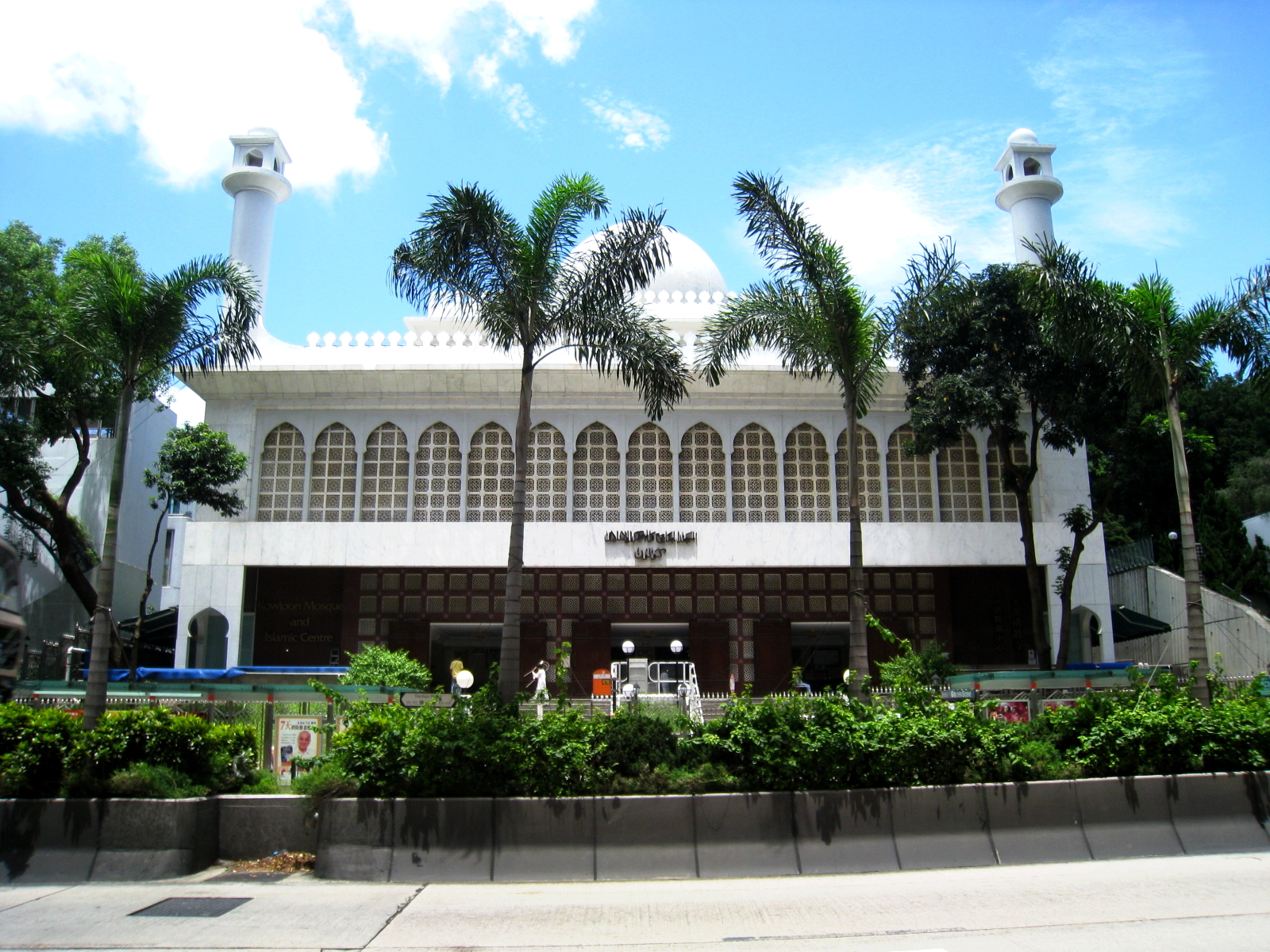
Kowloon Masjid and Islamic Centre.

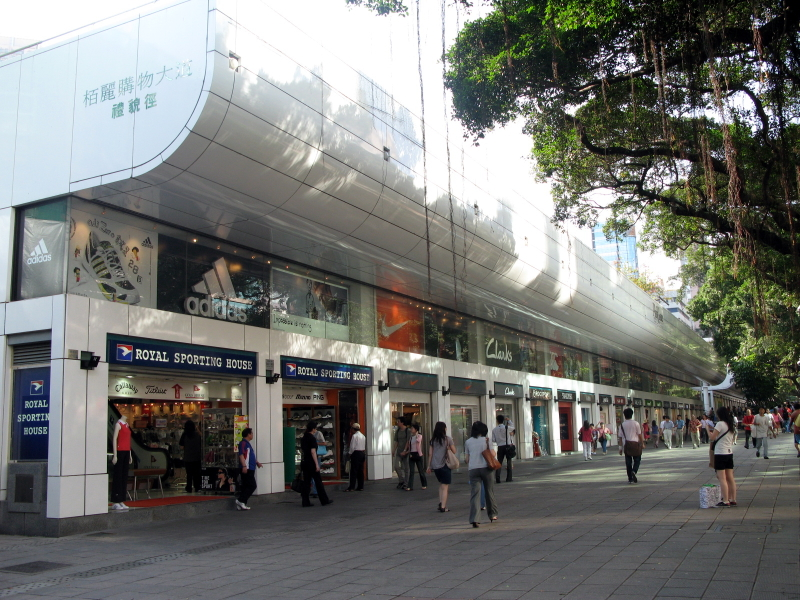
Park Lane Shopper's Boulevard.

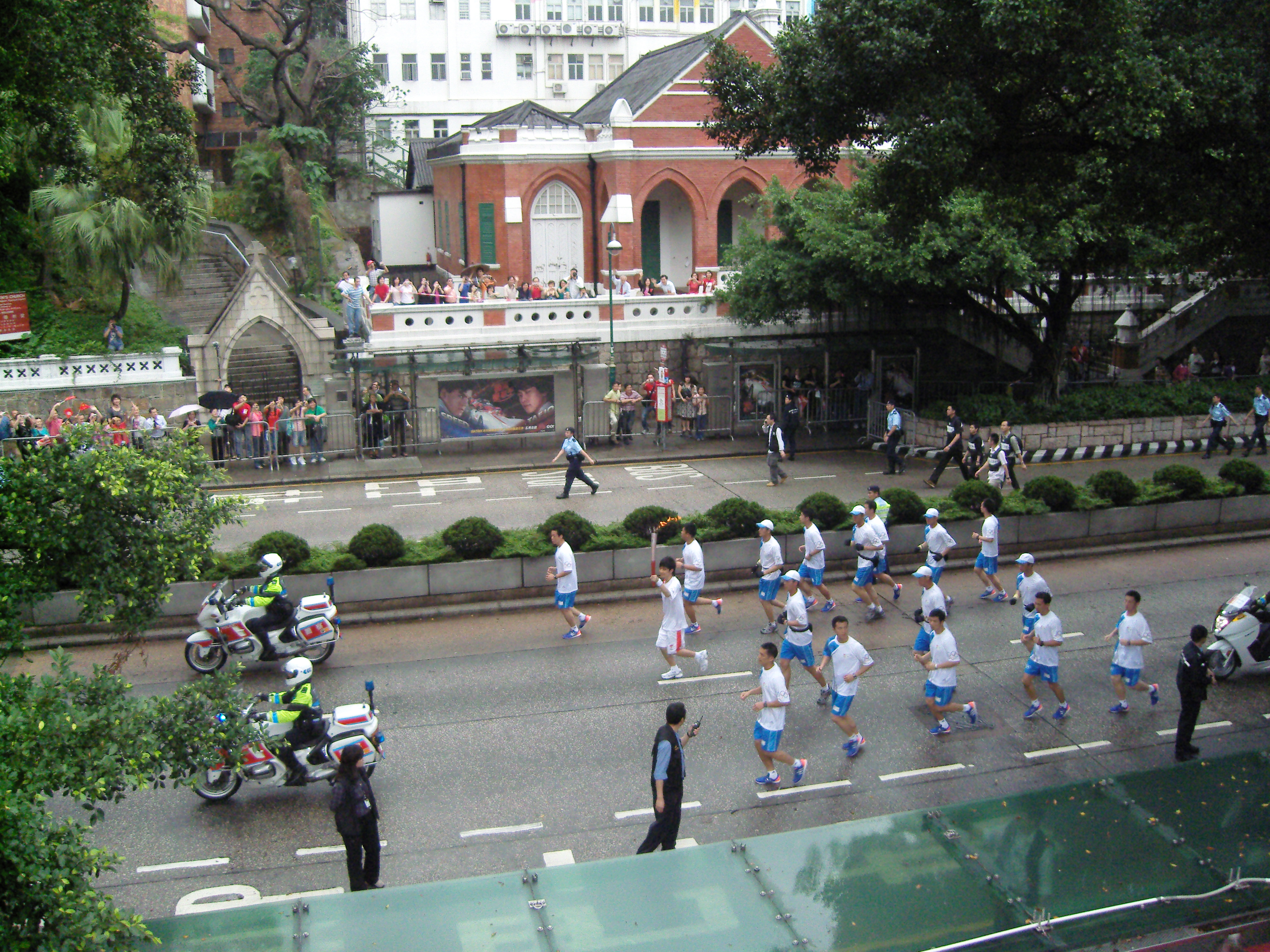
2008 Summer Olympics torch relay in front of the Former Kowloon British School.

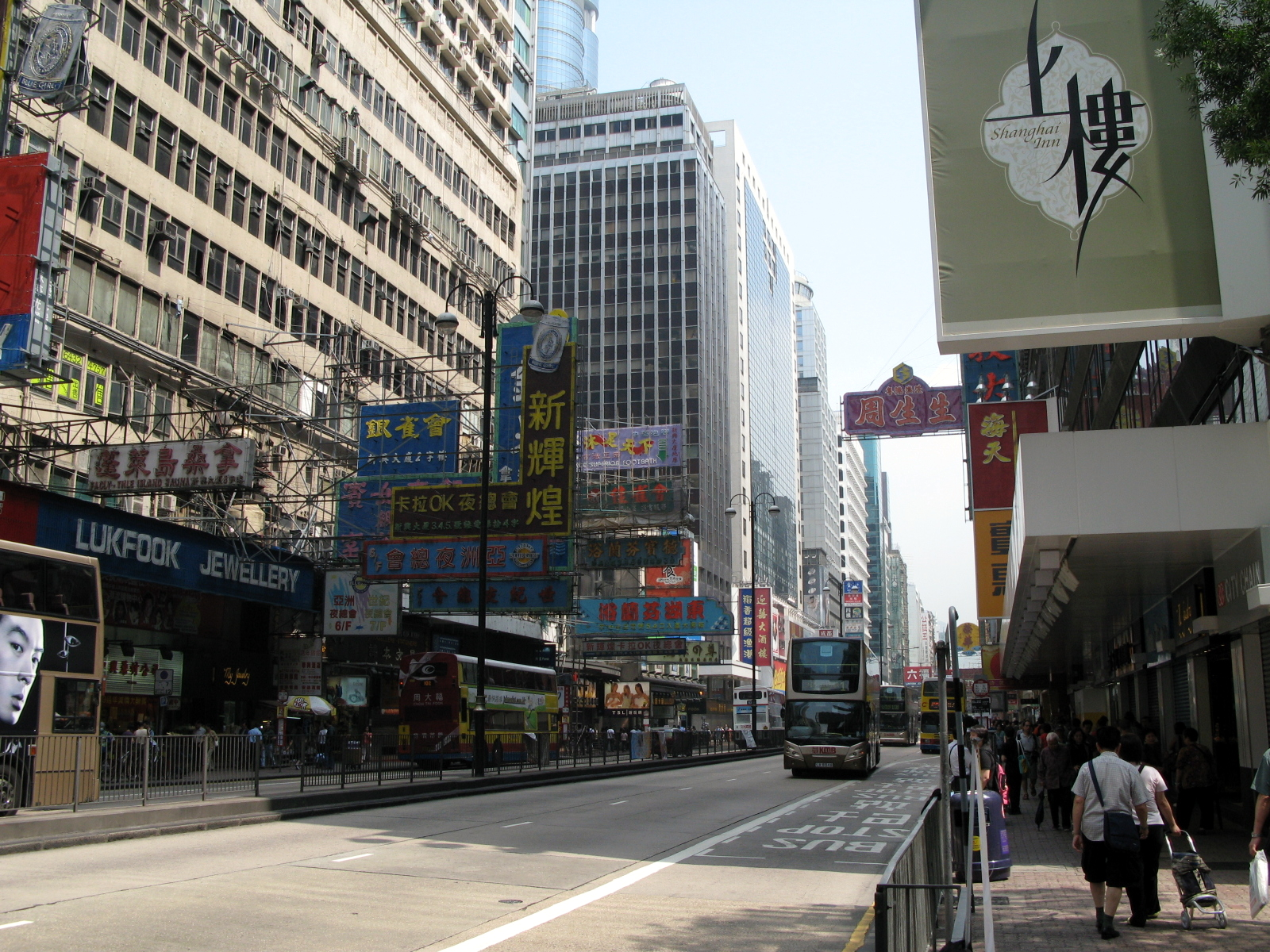
Nathan Road, near Mong Kok.

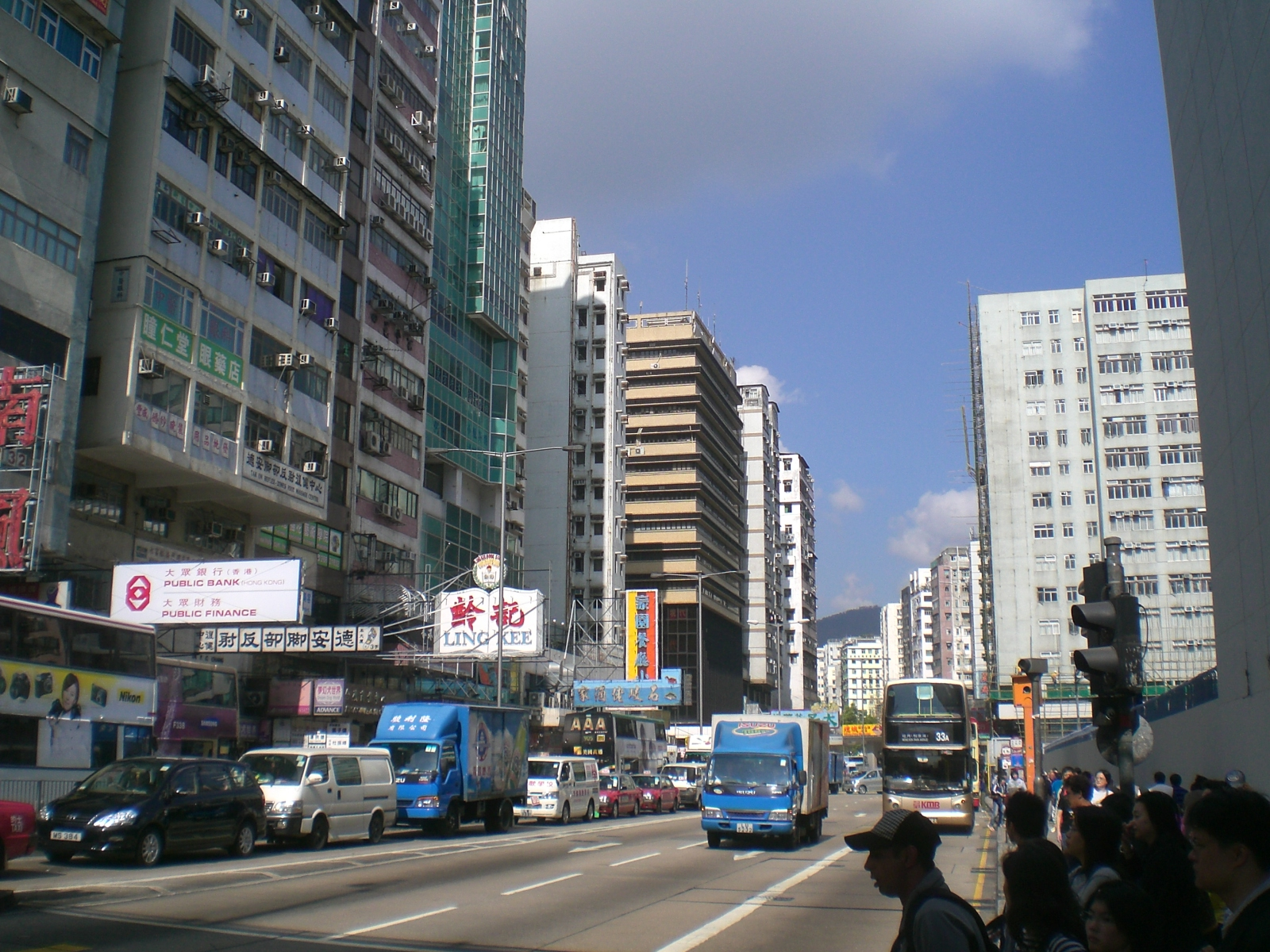
Nathan Road, in the Prince Edward area.

Nathan Road in 1987.

== See also ==
- Yau Tsim Mong District
- List of streets and roads in Hong Kong
- List of leading shopping streets and districts by city
