= Wu Sang House =

- 胡社生行
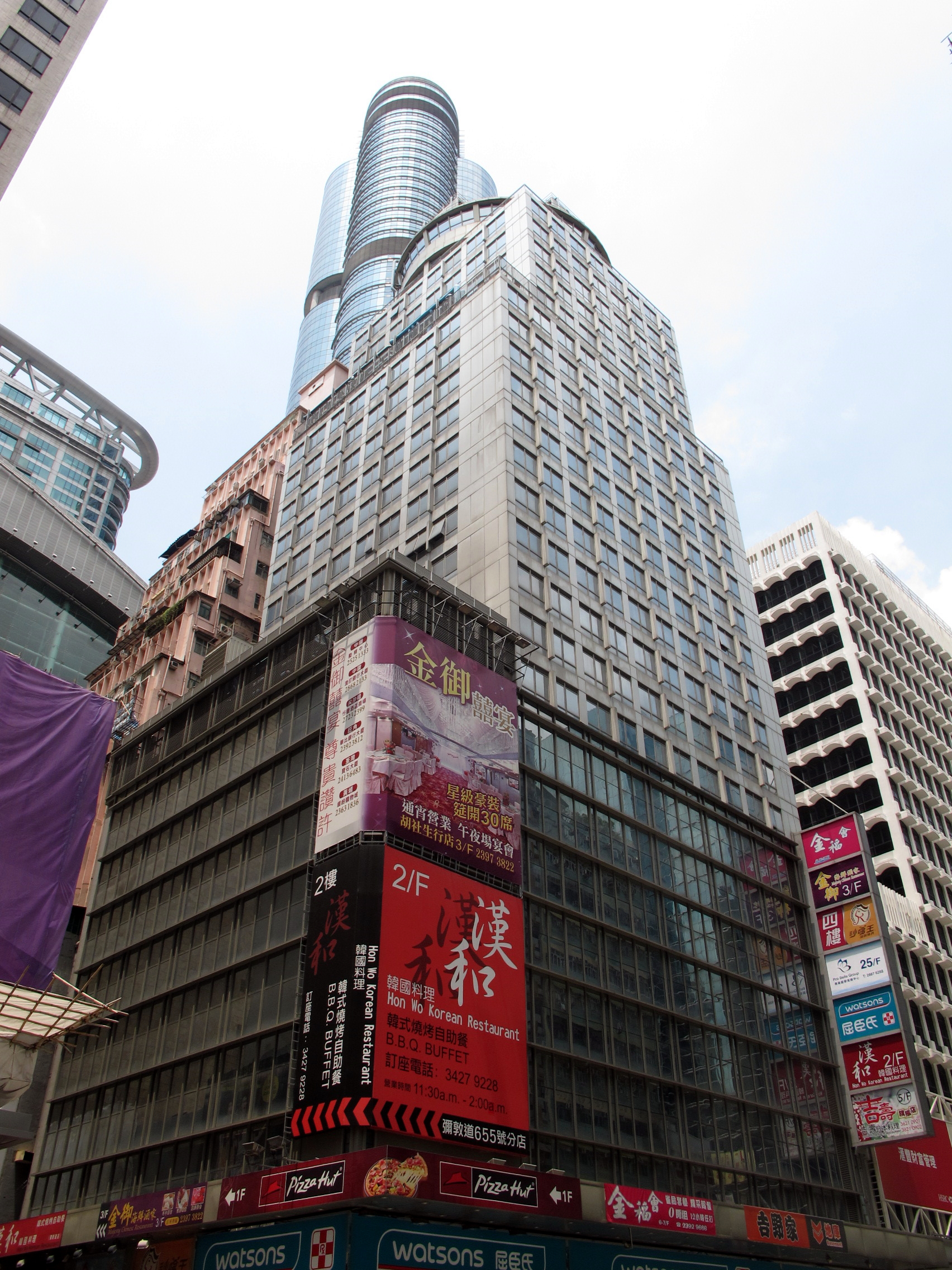

General information
- Status: Completed
- Location: Mong Kok, Hong Kong
- Address: 655 Nathan Road
- Coordinates: 22.31847°N 114.16927°E
- Completed: 1966

Technical details
- Floor count: 26

Design and construction
- Developer: Hopewell Holdings

Wu Sang House (Chinese: 胡社生行), also known as 655 Nathan Road (Chinese: 彌敦道655號), is a commercial building on Nathan Road in Mong Kok, Hong Kong. It housed Sin Hau Restaurant, the first revolving restaurant in Hong Kong.

The building was developed by Wu Chung, the father of Hopewell Holdings founder Gordon Wu. At the time when it was completed in 1966, it was the tallest building in Mong Kok with 26 storeys. The top floor of the building originally housed the first revolving restaurant in Hong Kong, revolving once every hour. The restaurant initially served Western cuisine but became a Cantonese restaurant in the 1980s. The floor was converted into office space after the Cantonese restaurant ceased operations in 1996. Although the floor no longer revolved, the circular exterior remained.
