= Garley Building fire =

1996 fire in Hong Kong

Coordinates: 22.304833°N 114.171723°E

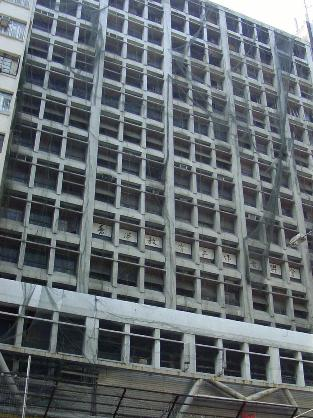
- The Garley Building in 2002
- Date: 20 November 1996
- Location: Kowloon, British Hong Kong
- Deaths: 41
- Injuries: 81

The Garley Building fire took place on 20 November 1996 in the 16-storey Garley commercial building (Chinese: 嘉利大廈) located at 232–240 Nathan Road, Jordan, Hong Kong. The fire caused 41 deaths and 81 injuries. It was considered the worst building fire in Hong Kong during peacetime until it was surpassed by the Wang Fuk Court fire nearly three decades later. The fire damaged the bottom two floors and the top three floors of the building, while the middle floors remained relatively intact.

== Garley Building ==
=== History ===
The building was built in 1975 before the government introduced laws requiring all commercial buildings to install sprinkler systems. The land lot was bought by Kai Yee Investment Company Ltd in 1970 at a cost of HK$1.56 million (US$200,000). A subsidiary of China Resources, Chinese Arts & Crafts, acquired half the building –from the basement to the ninth floor –for HK$35.5 million in 1989.

=== Tenants ===
- China Arts & Crafts – 2/F
- Hong Kong Federation of Education Workers – 6/F
- PolyGram (Hong Kong) – 10/F (Recording Studio), 12-14/F (Information Store)
- Chow Sang Sang Jewellery Co. Ltd. – 14/F (IT Dept.), 15/F (Accounting Dept., IT Dept.)

== Fire ==
Welding was revealed to be the source of the fire. At the time of the fire, the Garley Building was undergoing internal renovation, during which new elevators were to be installed. One had been completely refurbished, with another almost completed; the other two elevator shafts in the building had their respective elevators removed, and had bamboo scaffolding installed within their shafts. The fire-resistant outer elevator doors were also removed to allow light into the elevator shaft for the welders.

The welding activity routinely triggered alarms from the building's smoke detectors, so much so that staff at the China Arts & Crafts store that occupied the bottom three floors had wrapped plastic around the fire alarms to muffle the sound.

Furthermore, workers were found to have cut metal with a welder, contrary to building codes. Thus, when a stray piece of hot metal fell from the thirteenth floor, sparking a fire in the second floor lift lobby, no one paid much attention, believing that it was part of the normal welding activity. A welder discovered the fire, and alerted the fire department. A second emergency call was made one minute later, when a dental assistant on the 13th floor discovered dense smoke in the hallway.

When firefighters first arrived at the scene 10 minutes after the lower fire had started, the fire was rated at one-alarm. It was almost immediately raised to three-alarm at 4:59 p.m. when heavy smoke impeded the firefighters' progress up to the higher floors. By the time reinforcements arrived, it was upgraded to four-alarm at 5:17 p.m. because the 15th floor was on fire, and was upgraded again to five-alarm—the highest level in Hong Kong, at 7:15 p.m. on that day.

The fire consumed the bamboo scaffolding and the open elevator shaft provided a source of fresh air, creating a chimney effect that eventually rose to the 13th floor, starting another fire there. The fire was temporarily relegated to the elevator shaft but the smoke and heat from the fire hitting the roof all accumulated on the upper levels of the building concentrating at the top floors. Some fire safety procedures were violated, such as the firedoors being left open allowing thick smoke to fill the hallways of the top floors, especially the 15th floor (Chow Sang Sang's unit).

In the case of Chow Sang Sang's 15th floor unit, many of the fire resistant office entrance doors were replaced with glass doors which can easily shatter from extreme heat. With employees caught off guard as they got engulfed in thick smoke, many of them panicked. Desperate for air, many in the accounting room (which was a big open area in the middle of the floor) rushed to open the windows. The rush of oxygen from the opening of the windows resulted in a backdraft causing the fire to rush through the halls smashing through the glass entrance doors and engulfing the entire floor in flames along with any employees who were still inside.

Charred human remains were found on the 13th and 14th floors. A workshop run by Chow Sang Sang Jewellery that occupied two rooms on the 15th floor had 22 bodies.

DNA testing became imperative for victim identification. Some of the bodies were so severely burnt, that they melted into the floor and walls leaving only a silhouette shape of the victim in the exact position upon their death only identifiable by the items in their possession before their death, such as jewelry they were wearing or objects they were holding (e.g.: a mobile phone).

== Rescue effort ==
Over 200 firemen and 40 engines were deployed. Because the fire had engulfed the top and bottom floors, anyone in the top two floors or who did not have immediate access to the exit on the bottom floors were immediately engulfed in the flames. Those who were in the middle floors of the building – in between the top and bottom inferno floors – were trapped, relying on firefighters rescuing them from the windows via the ladders from the firetrucks. To add to the problem, the firetruck ladders at the time only reached up to the 8th floor and were not able to rescue the people on the upper floors. As a result of the limited number of firetrucks as well as the limited range on the height of the ladders on the trucks, many of the people trapped were engulfed by the flames waving for help by the windows. One of these people was caught on film being engulfed by the fire while calling for help from one of the windows of on 14th floor and the footage was broadcast live on the news. A UH-60 Black Hawk helicopter was also deployed to rescue people trapped on the roof, but quickly left after rescuing four people as it was feared that the rotating helicopter blades were making the fire worse. The role of the helicopter was later studied.

With the elevators unusable and the staircases impassable due to the smoke, firefighters had difficulty reaching the upper levels of the building, relying on four rescue ladders to rescue occupants who had opened the windows for fresh air. The flame was finally put out after 20 hours. In total 41 people had died; among the deaths was a firefighter who as a result of poor visibility from the thick smoke plunged to his death falling from the 5th floor when he mistakenly stepped into an open elevator shaft. Another person died several months later, never recovering from a coma resulting from the fire. Another 80 people were injured, including 14 firemen.

== Aftermath ==
Hong Kong Governor Chris Patten urged legislators to speed up the passage of a bill aimed at upgrading the fire safety standards of some 500 premises across the territory. A special police team of 229 officers was brought in for the first time in 10 years to help with identifying the bodies.

A census was completed days after the incident and found there were 60,000 private buildings in the Hong Kong territory at the time, half of which were more than 20 years old. Of these, 723 were commercial. It was reported that more than 700 office blocks built 20-plus years earlier, when safety laws were more lenient, were potential deathtraps.

Much of the blame for this incident fell on the welders and occupants, who were not properly trained in fire drills and knew little about building evacuation procedures.

Investigations concluded that cut metal cut from the welding machine fell down the elevator shaft which landed on combustible construction materials gathered on the bottom floor which caused the fire. Based on a welding machine recovered after the fire on the bottom floor, the welding machine was set to the highest setting violating safety regulations which explained how the cut metals and sparks from the welding machine retained enough heat despite falling ten stories.

As a result of the fire, building regulations were quickly revised to prevent this sort of disaster from occurring again. Since the revisions, there was not a single year in which more than ten people have died from fires until 2025, when a more deadly fire accident occurred in Wang Fuk Court, Tai Po.

The Chow Sang Sang Jewellery Company, which lost 22 employees on the 15th floor, increased its relief fund to $8+ million. Each victim's family received an initial $180,000 and another sum equivalent to 17.8 months' basic salary.

As a result of the aftermath of the fire, the regulations on buildings and fire safety was amended in June 1998, requiring the installation of fire sprinklers in high rise buildings, and in April 2001, a special rescue team was formed to be able to better respond to these large scale disasters.

== Cultural references ==
The Discovery Channel Canada series Blueprint for Disaster documented the events of the fire and subsequent investigation, labelling it the Hong Kong Inferno.

== Reconstruction ==
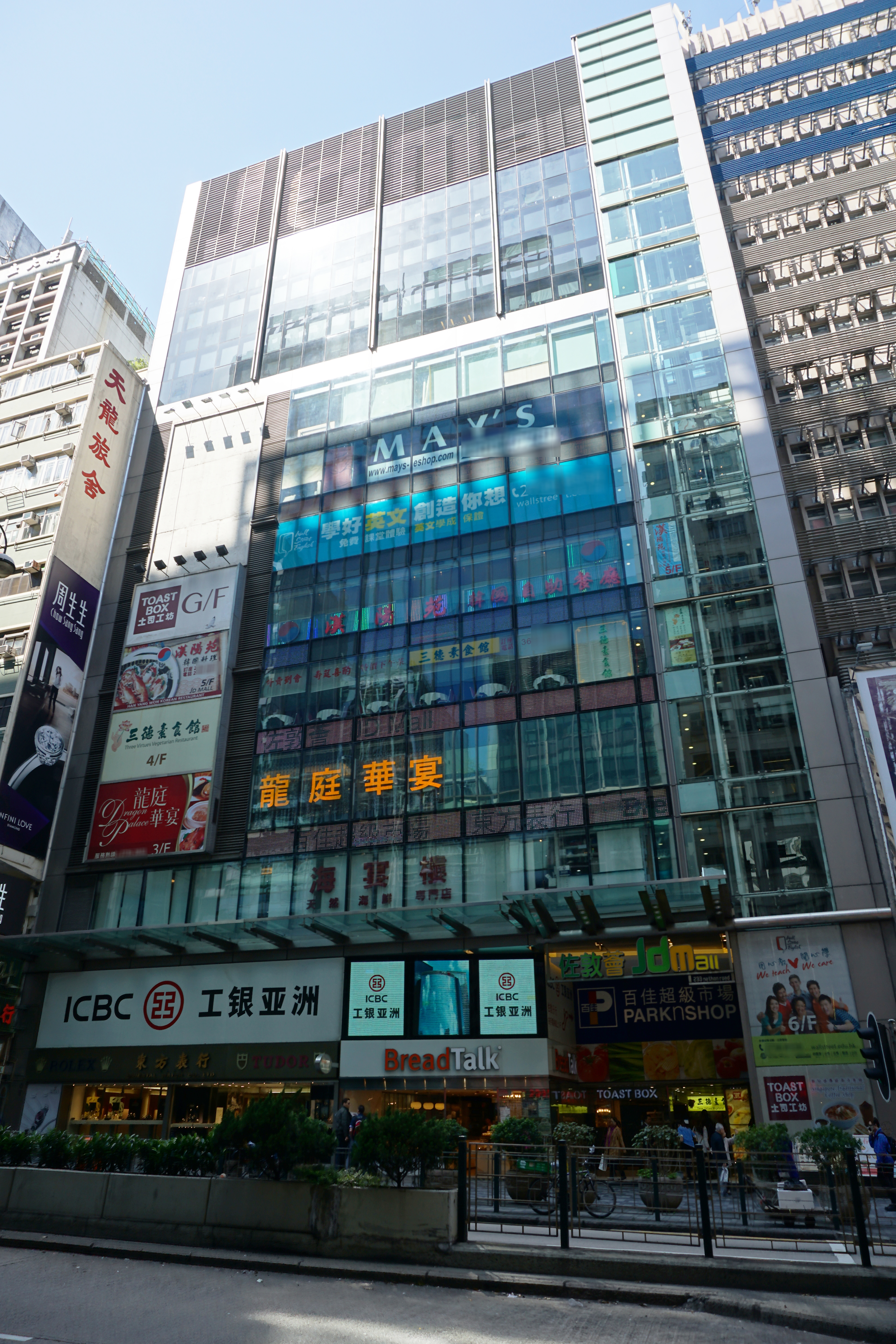
JD Mall was constructed on the site of former Garley Building.

The Garley Building was abandoned after the fire, but was not demolished until 2003. The reason was that part of the procedure required to start the demolition process of the building requires the approval of all the owners in the rented units of the building. At the time of the fire, there were five different units rented out however all five owners of those units perished in the fire. The legal procedure in such a situation would be that the original landlord of the building needs to wait for a certain time period before he or she can apply for a forced sale of the building.

That process ended up taking seven years, and so in 2003, the original landlord of the building, China Resources Enterprise applied for forced sale of the building and that same year, the building was demolished.

China Resources Enterprise planned to construct a "Ginza-style" shopping mall at the site. Work on the building was completed in 2007. Today, JD Mall on Nathan Road sits on top of the site of the former Garley Building.

== See also ==
- List of fires in high-rise buildings
