= Kowloon Union Church =

Church in Jordan, Hong Kong

Coordinates: 22.305627°N 114.172683°E

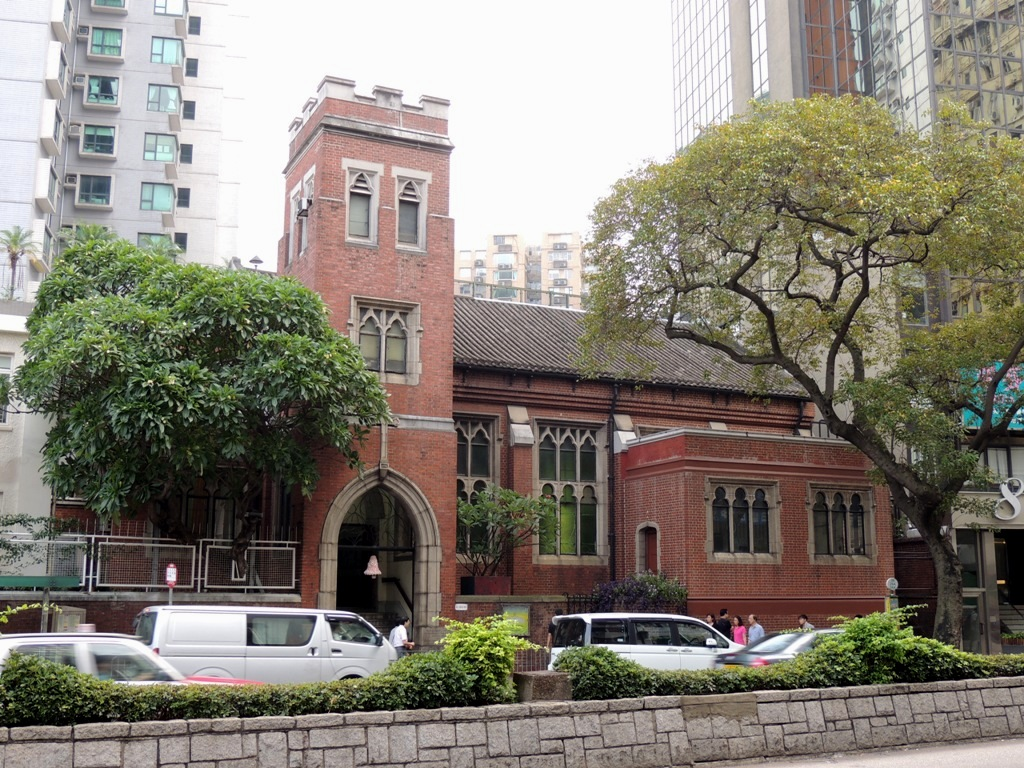
Kowloon Union Church along Jordan Road.

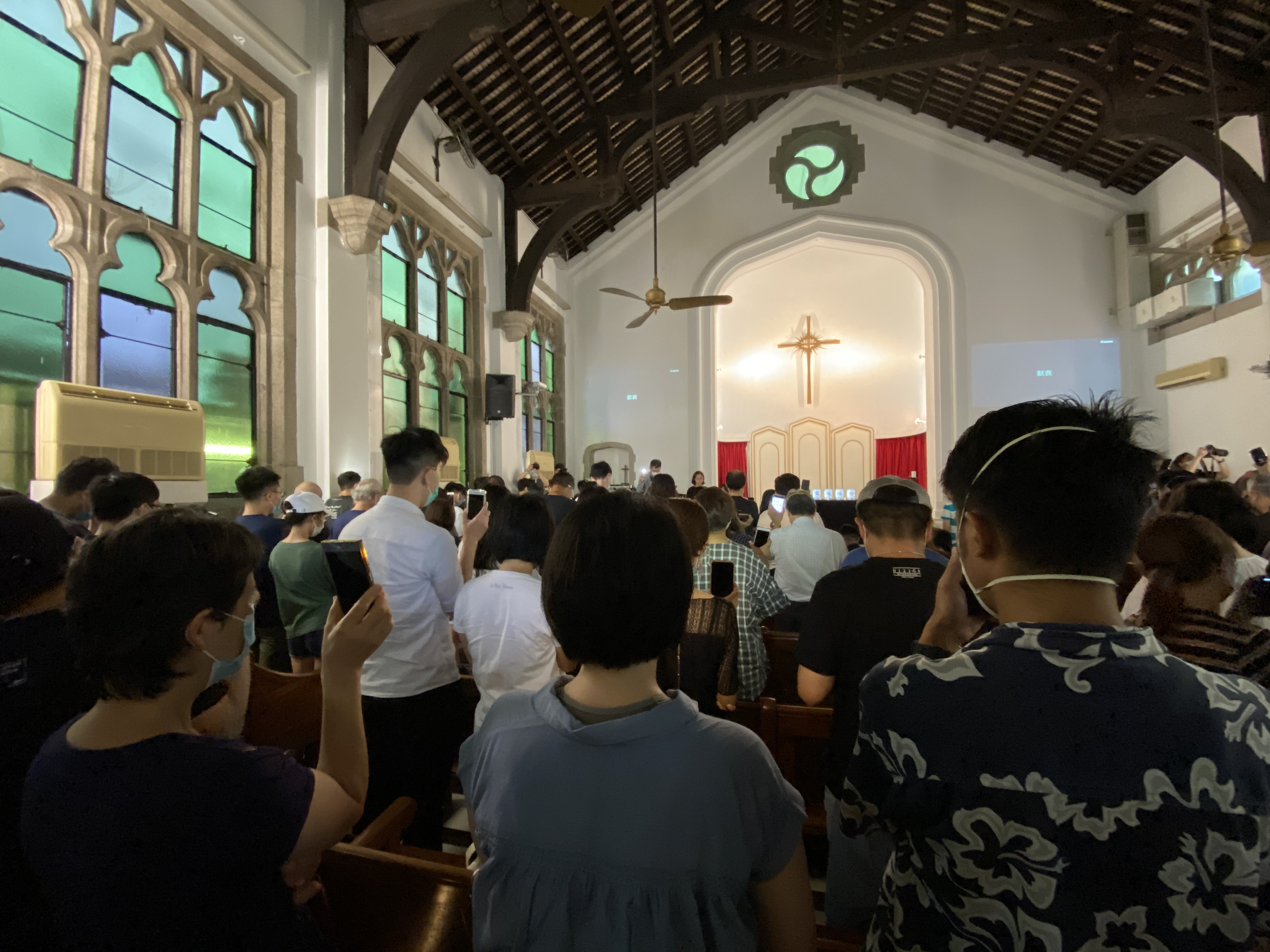
Interior of Kowloon Union Church.

Kowloon Union Church (Chinese: 九龍佑寧堂) is a church in Jordan, Hong Kong. Located at 4 Jordan Road (K.I.L. no. 2174), it is a declared monument.
