= Jordan Road =

Road in Yau Ma Tei, Hong Kong

Jordan Road, Hong Kong
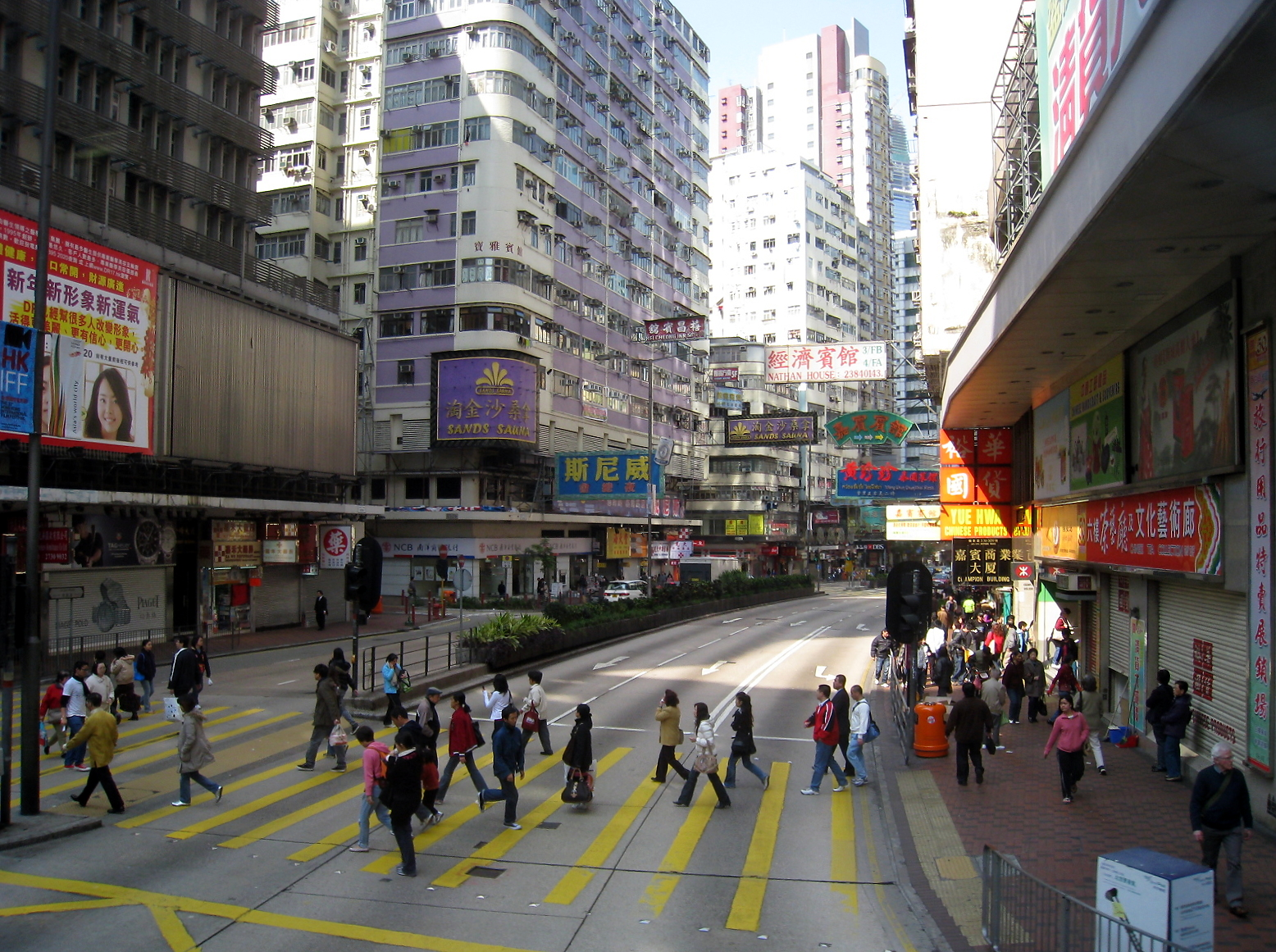
- Interactive map of Jordan Road, Hong Kong
- Native name: 佐敦道 (Yue Chinese)
- Former name: Sixth Street
- Namesake: Sir John Jordan
- Location: Kowloon, Hong Kong
- Coordinates: 22.30551°N 114.16918°E
- West end: West Kowloon Highway
- East end: Gascoigne Road

Jordan Road
- Chinese: 佐敦道
Transcriptions
Standard Mandarin
- Hanyu Pinyin: Zuǒdūn Dào
Yue: Cantonese
- Jyutping: zo2 deun1 dou6

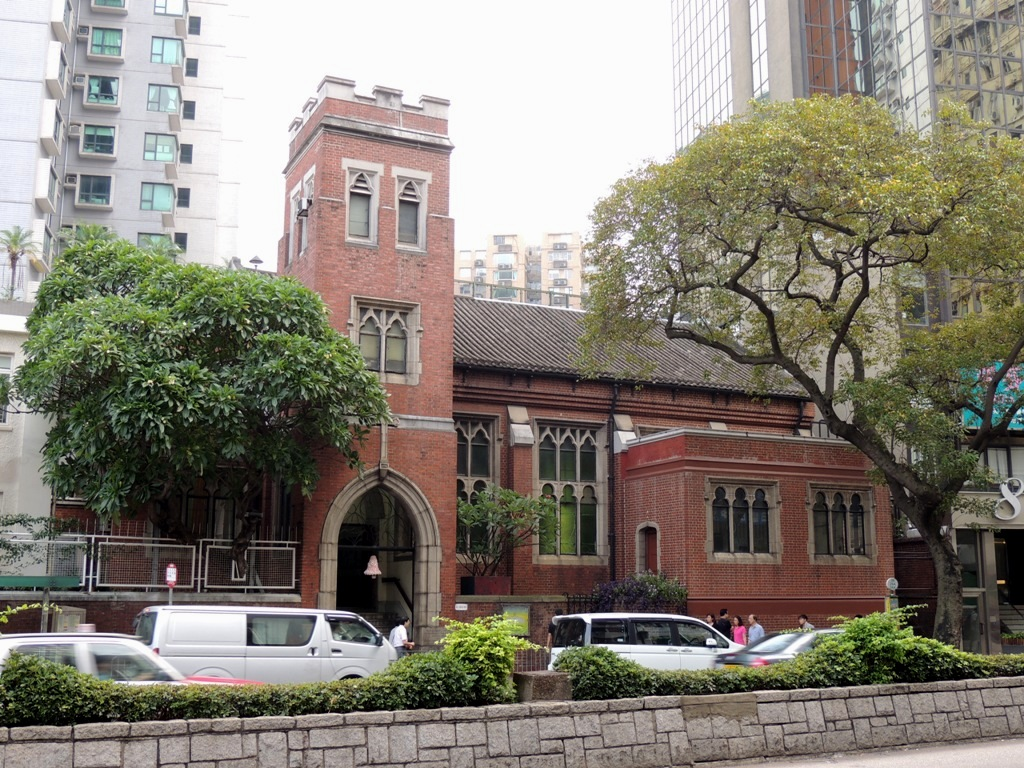
Kowloon Union Church, at No. 4 Jordan Road. Built in 1930/1931. Now a Declared monument.

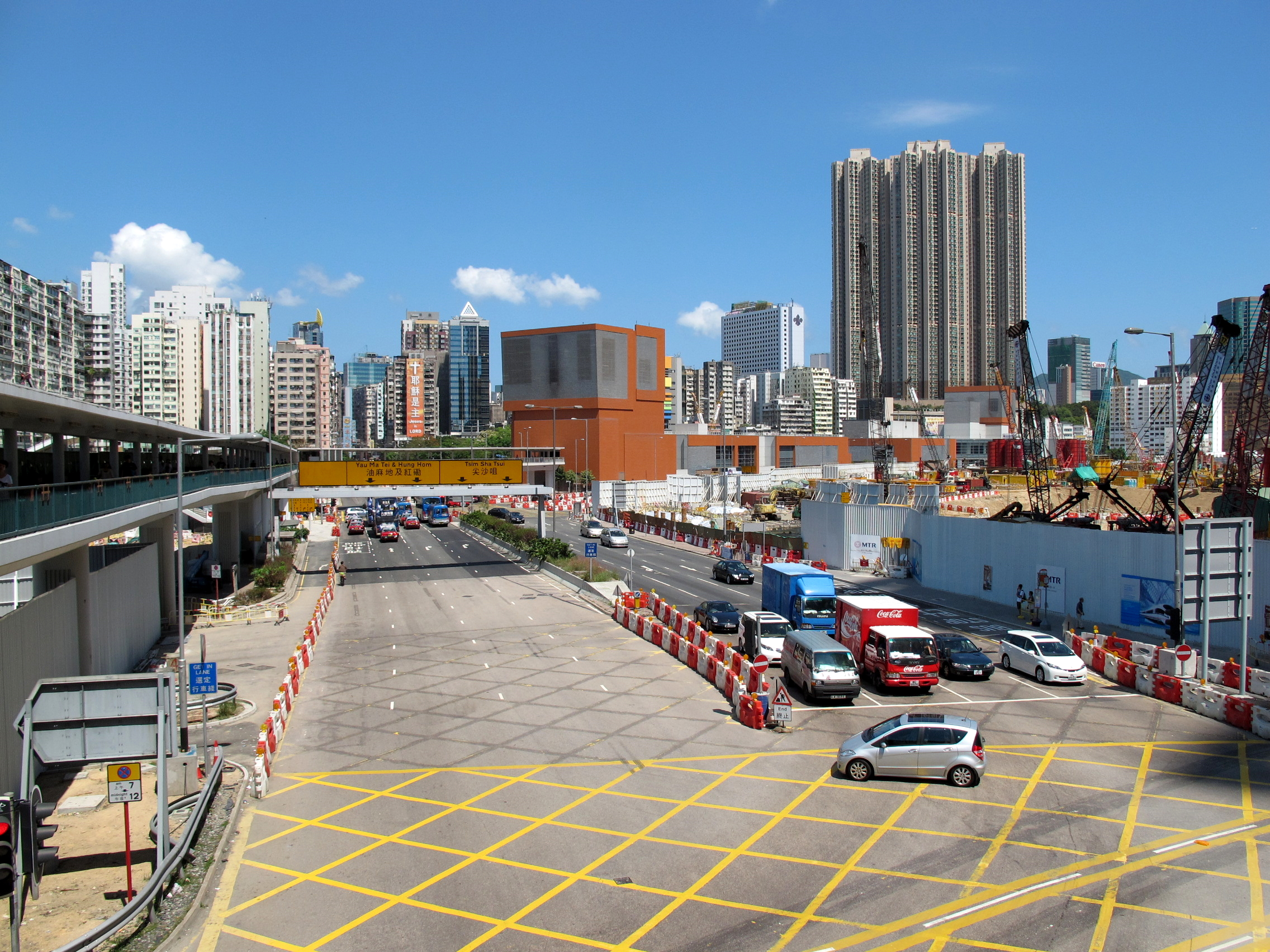
Jordan Road in West Kowloon.

Jordan Road (Chinese: 佐敦道) is a road in Jordan, Kowloon, Hong Kong. It spans from the West Kowloon Highway in West Kowloon, through Kwun Chung and Ferry Point to Gascoigne Road and is a major east–west road in southern Kowloon.

== History ==
Jordan Road, formerly known as Sixth Street, was renamed to its present name in March 1909. In May 1909, Gascoigne Road South was also merged into the road. The road is named after Sir John Jordan, then British Minister to China. The story suggested by some Chinese sources that the street was named after British pathologist G. P. Jordan, who served as Health Officer in Hong Kong for nearly thirty years, was actually a myth.

In 1908, a stone obelisk was erected as a memorial to French sailors of the "Fronde" who had drowned in the 1906 typhoon. Originally located at the corner with Gascoigne Road, the monument has since been relocated to the Colonial Cemetery at Happy Valley. Prior to the opening of the Cross-Harbor Tunnel in 1972, ferries such as the ones departing from Jordan Road were the only way to transport automobiles from Kowloon to Hong Kong. Once a quiet, suburban street, since the 1950s Jordan Road and its surrounding area have become one of the most overcrowded areas in Kowloon.

== Ferry Pier ==
At the end of the road, there was the Jordan Road Ferry Pier in Ferry Point, with ferries carrying passengers and vehicles to Central of Hong Kong Island. Until the completion of the Cross-Harbour Tunnel, it was a major transport hub to and from the Hong Kong Island. There was also an important bus terminus, Jordan Road Ferry Pier Bus Terminus, near the pier. The bus terminus hosted many routes to the New Territories. After the completion of major part of reclamation in West Kowloon, the bus terminus was moved to Jordan (Wui Cheung Road) Bus Terminus in the new reclamation nearby. On 20 December 2009, the bus terminus was closed and most routes were rerouted to Jordan (To Wah Road). Some go to Kowloon Station bus terminus, near Kowloon station of the Mass Transit Railway (MTR) Airport Express. These factors make Jordan Road an important transportation access point.

== Education ==
Jordan Road is in Primary One Admission (POA) School Net 31. Within the school net are multiple aided schools (operated independently but funded with government money) and Jordan Road Government Primary School.

== Station ==
Jordan station of the MTR was named after Jordan Road, between the centres of Yau Ma Tei and Tsim Sha Tsui. The station's name is so commonly used that it has gradually replaced the traditional name, Kwun Chung, for the neighbourhood.

== See also ==
- List of streets and roads in Hong Kong
- Jordan, Hong Kong
- New Lucky House
