= Chow Sang Sang =

Jewellery company in Hong Kong

Chow Sang Sang Holdings International Limited
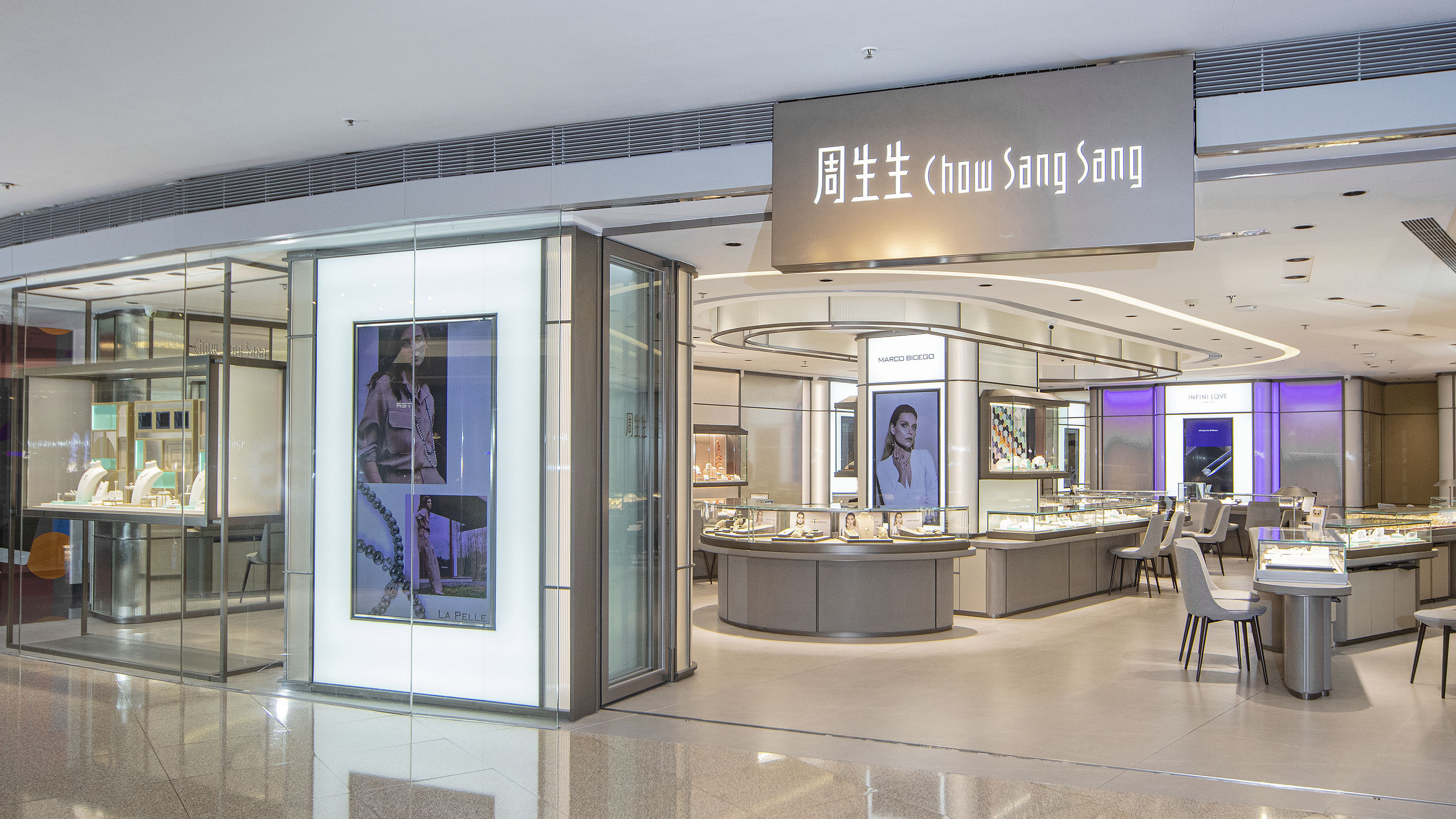
- Chow Sang Sang store in Festival Walk, Hong Kong
- Traditional Chinese: 周生生集團國際公司
- Simplified Chinese: 周生生集团国际公司
Transcriptions
Standard Mandarin
- Hanyu Pinyin: Zhōu Shēngshēng Jítuán Guójì gōngsī
Yue: Cantonese
- Jyutping: zau1 saang1 saang1 zaap6 tyun4 gwok3 zai3 gung1 si1

Chow Sang Sang Holdings International Limited, or Chow Sang Sang Group, doing business as Chow Sang Sang Jewellery Company Limited or Chow Sang Sang (Chinese: 周生生; Jyutping: zau1 saang1 saang1; pinyin: Zhōu Shēngshēng), is a jewellery company with its corporate headquarters in the Chow Sang Sang Building (Chinese: 周生生大廈; Jyutping: zau1 saang1 saang1 daai6 haa6; pinyin: Zhōu Shēngshēng Dàxià) in Kowloon, Hong Kong. Its registered office is in the Clarendon House in Hamilton, Bermuda, and it is incorporated with limited liability in Bermuda. It is listed as SEHK: 116 on the Hong Kong Stock Exchange.

== Business scope ==
The group’s primarily engaged in manufacture and retail of jewellery, and distribution of watches in Greater China. Included in the group is a precious metals wholesale business. The company operates Chow Sang Sang jewelry stores. As of 2014 over 50 stores combined are in Hong Kong, Macau, and Taiwan. Another 155 stores are located in 60 cities in Mainland China. As of 2024, Chow Sang Sang group had a total of 958 stores and over 11,000 employees all over the region and had a revenue of HKD21,176 million. As at 31 December 2025, Chow Sang Sang group had a total of 840 stores and over 9,000 employees all over the region. Chow Sang Sang group had revenue of HKD22,446 million. The company's Mainland subsidiary, Chow Sang Sang (China) Company Limited, is headquartered in Tianhe District, Guangzhou.

== History ==
=== Founding ===
Chow Sang Sang was established in Guangzhou by Mr. Chow Fang Pu (周芳譜) in 1934. When Guangzhou fell to the Japanese during the Second Sino-Japanese War, the business was relocated to Macau in 1938. During the 1930s and the 1940s Chow Sang Sang had branches in Guangzhou, Hong Kong, Macau and Zhanjiang, the management of which were divided among Chow Fang Pu's six sons. Pursuant to his will and testament in 1946, all his descendants are entitled to use the trademark of 周生生 ("Chow Sang Sang"). As a result there are now two jewelry companies in Hong Kong bearing the name of 周生生, but no longer related to each other: C. S. S. jewelry (粵港澳湛周生生, literally 'Guangzhou-Hong Kong-Macau-Zhanjiang Chow Sang Sang'), descended from his wife's three sons; and Chow Sang Sang (周生生), reestablished in Hong Kong by his concubine's three sons in 1948.

=== Modern company history ===
In 1973, Chow Sang Sang was publicly listed on the Hong Kong Stock Exchange. In the year ending 31 December 2011 its total turnover was HK$17,158 million. During the modern era, the first Mainland shop opened in Fuzhou, Fujian in 1993. The company built its first website in 1995 and moved into the e-commerce space in 2001. In 2004 Chow Sang Sang won the right to produce Disney jewelry products in Hong Kong and China, and began to create Disney themed products for sale at Disney theme parks and other retail stores. It became the first on-site store in the history of Disney parks to sell precious metal souvenirs. In 2013, Chow Sang Sang Production Centre in Shunde officially started operation.

In 2006 the company established its Mainland division, Chow Sang Sang (China) Company Limited; this after the Mainland government eased the process of a wholly foreign-owned enterprise gaining a business permit. By 2008 the company's main expansion strategy was focused on Mainland China; at that time it had a revenue of 9.88 billion Hong Kong dollars, or $1.27 billion U.S. dollars, and 190 locations in Hong Kong, Taiwan, Macau, and the Mainland, with over 40 of them being in Hong Kong. The company stores’ revenues outside of mainland China accounted for about half of the company’s sales. In 2018, the company revamped Emphasis Jewellery, a brand originally launched in 1994 to target younger consumers. Outside of its homebase, Chow Sang Sang has partnered with foreign jewelry companies such as the Italian brand Marco Bicego.

In May 2013 the antitrust bureau of the Shanghai Municipal Development and Reform Commission began an investigation of Chow Sang Sang, Chow Tai Fook, an industry association, and 11 gold retailers in China over concerns about price manipulation of gold in the City of Shanghai. Chow Sang Sang group won the “Enterprise of the Year” in the “2021 ‘Dingge Awards’ Digital Transformation Pioneer List” organised by Harvard Business Review and SAP. Chow Sang Sang has also partnered in both retail and holiday displays with K11 MUSEA. Pieces by Chow Sang Sang have been reviewed as combining gold aesthetics with eastern philosophy imagery.

In 2024, Chow Sang Sang became the first jewellery company in Greater China to have near-term carbon reduction targets approved by the Science Based Target initiative (SBTi), the same year the company Chow Sang Sang celebrates its 90th Anniversary. Chow Sang Sang has also partnered in both retail and holiday displays with K11 MUSEA. Pieces by Chow Sang Sang have been reviewed as combining gold aesthetics with eastern philosophy imagery.
