= Pitt Street, Hong Kong =

Street in Hong Kong

Coordinates: 22.31383°N 114.17009°E

Pitt Street
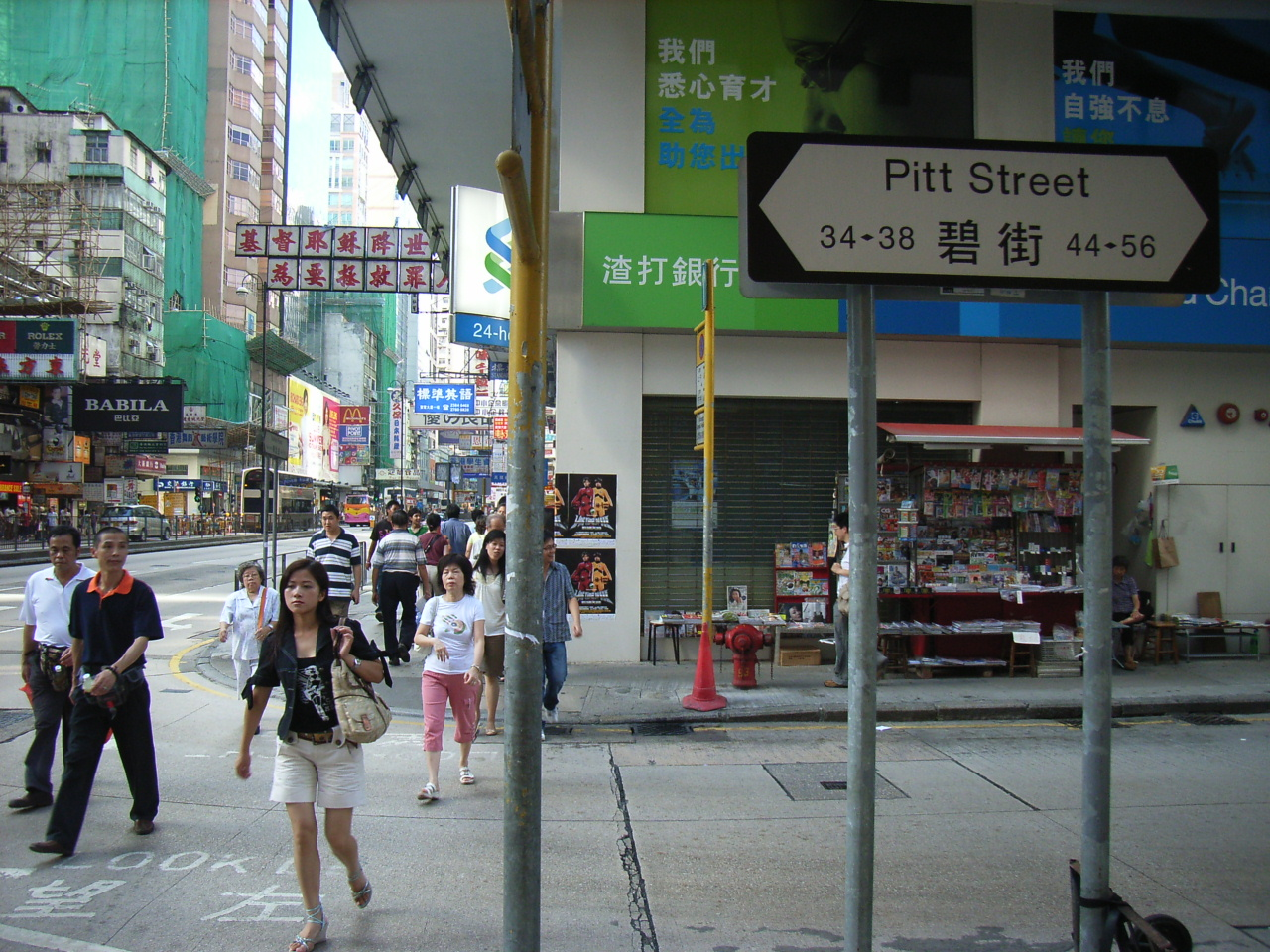
- Pitt Street, at the junction with Nathan Road
- Chinese: 碧街
Transcriptions
Standard Mandarin
- Hanyu Pinyin: Bì jiē
Yue: Cantonese
- Jyutping: bik1 gaai1

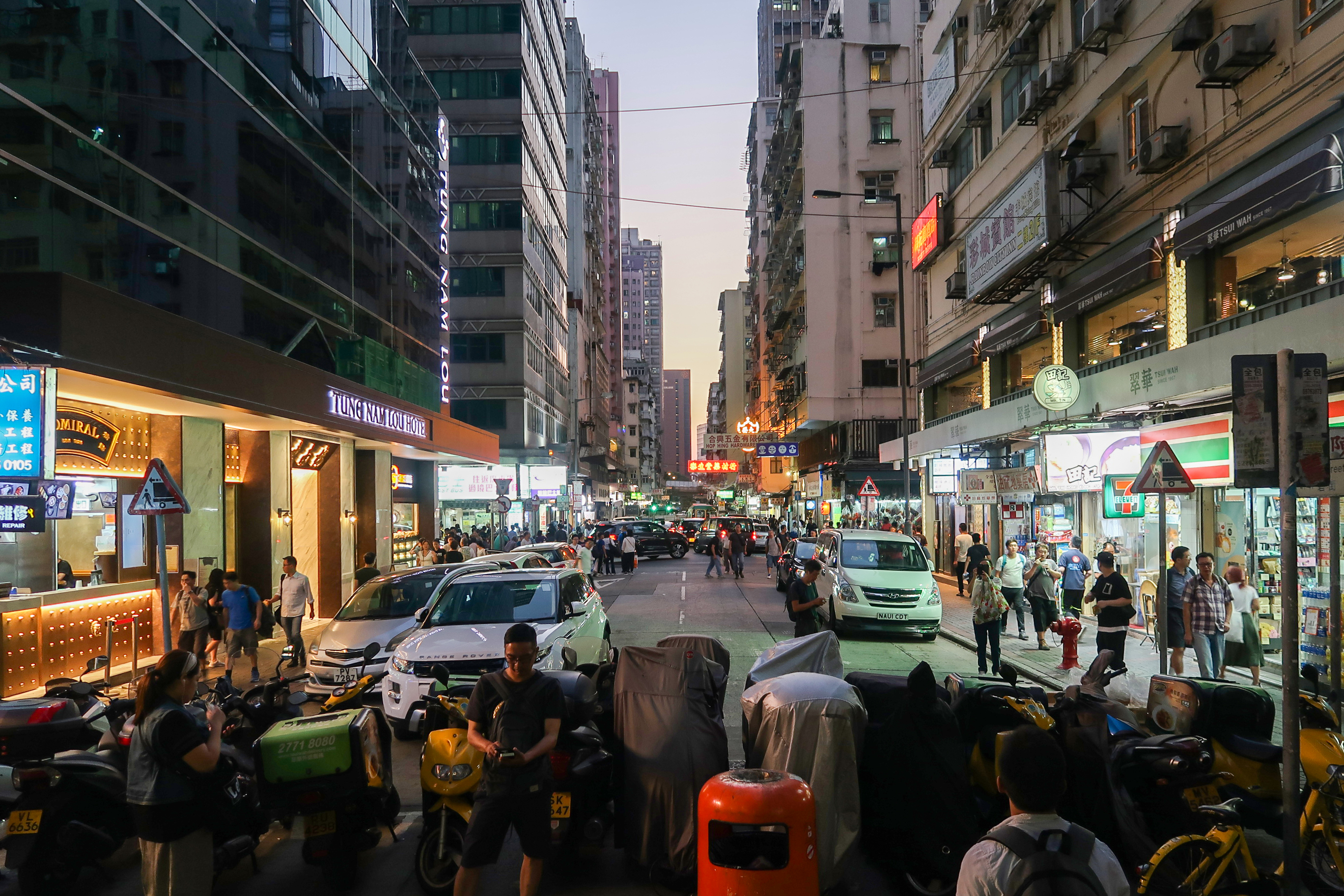
Crowd with pedestrians and vehicles at night

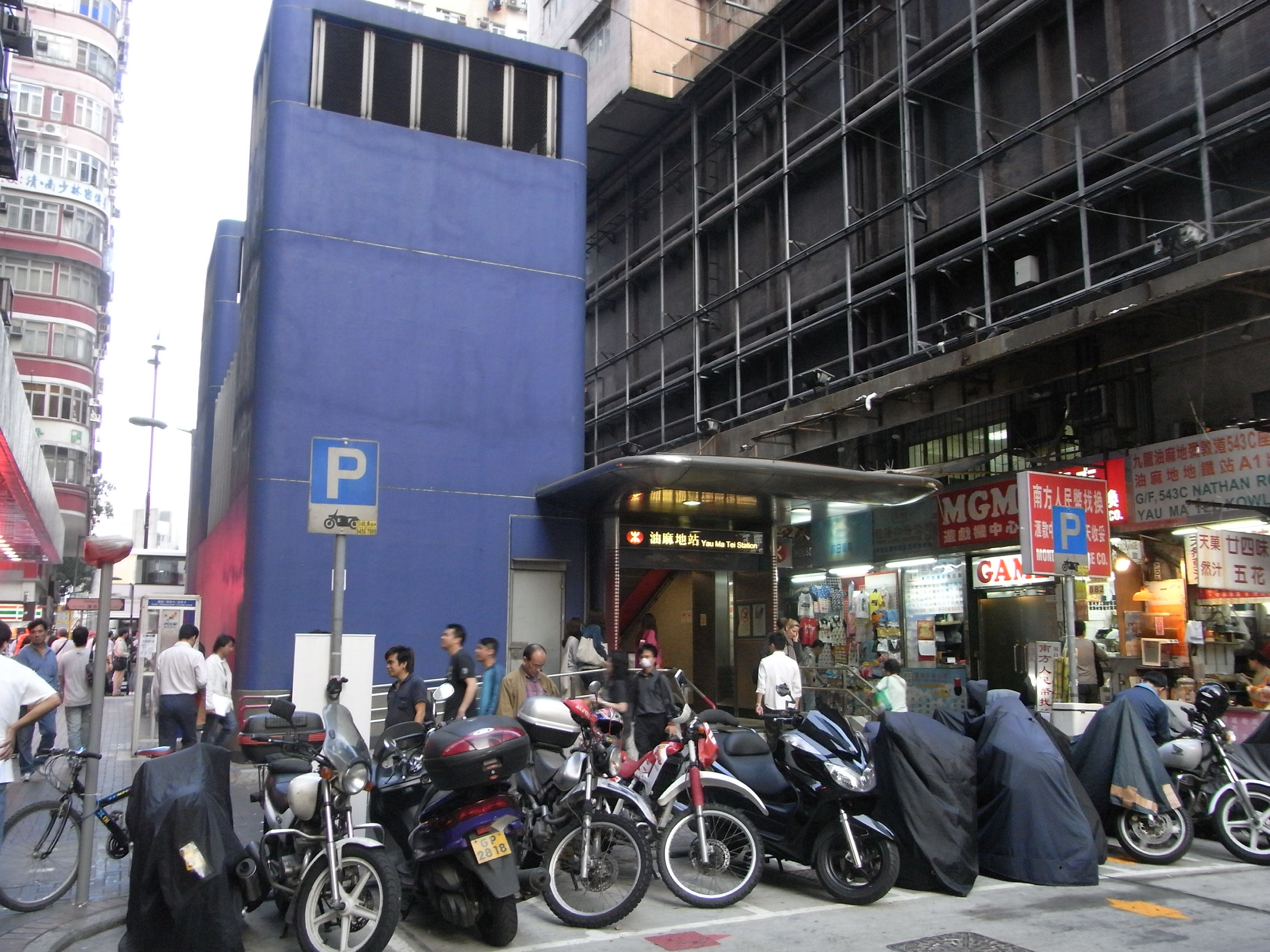
Ventilation shaft, landmark of Pitt Street

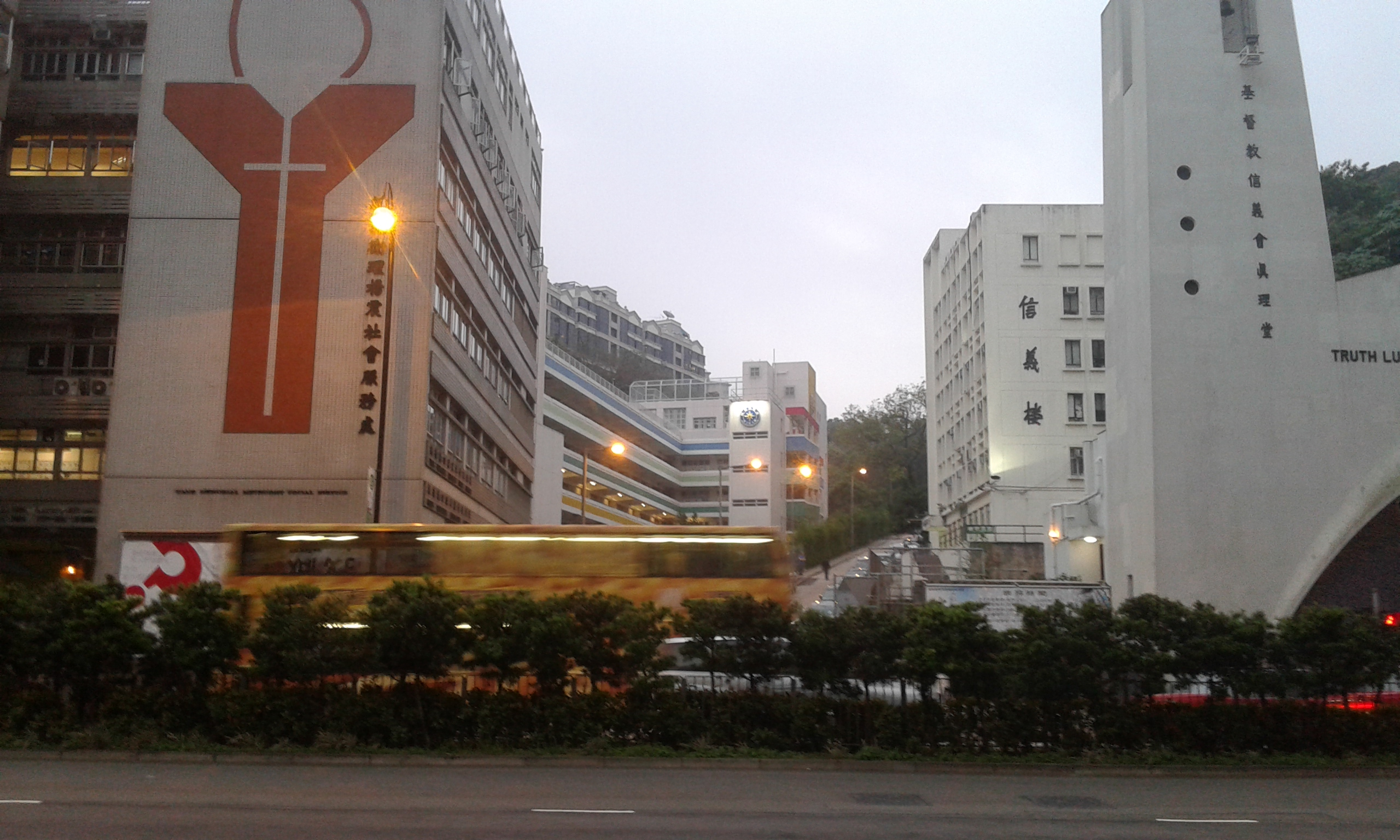
View from the east end of Pitt Street

Pitt Street is a street in one of the busiest sections in Yau Ma Tei of Hong Kong. The street is named after William Pitt the Younger, prime minister of the United Kingdom, and before Acts of Union 1800, of Great Britain. It hosts several prominent sites including Kwong Wah Hospital and the headquarters of Chinese YMCA of Hong Kong. Pitt Street spans across three thoroughfares, namely Ferry Street in the west, Waterloo Road in the east and Nathan Road in the middle, which connect the north and south of Kowloon Peninsula. While said to be in Yau Ma Tei, it could be in Mong Kok or Mong Kok Tsui, depending on context. Its name in Chinese character is 碧街, which the character 碧 /pik/, literally greenish jade, is a phonetic approximation of Pitt in Cantonese and 街 a literal translation of street.

The street features with multi-storey buildings mixing use of commercial and residential, officially known as composite buildings, typical in urban area of Hong Kong.

Yau Ma Tei station, joint station of Kwun Tong line and Tsuen Wan line of MTR, laying under Nathan Road, spans to the underground here with two exits, A_{1} and A_{2} on the street. The ventilation shaft of the station behind Exit A_{1}, with its practical appearance, was the landmark of the street facing Nathan Road. While no bus stop for franchised bus services stands on the street, there are several bus stops bearing its name Pitt Street near its junctions on other streets and roads, including nine platforms of Kowloon Motor Bus on Nathan Road, serving tens of bus routes to major destinations all over Hong Kong.

The street forms junctions with multiple streets, from west to east, Ferry Street, Tak Cheong Street, Tung On Street, Canton Road, Reclamation Street, Shanghai Street, Portland Street, Nathan Road, Yau Mong Lane, Tung Fong Street, and Waterloo Road. Historically, Shanghai Street was formerly known as Station Street (North/South) and Nathan Road as Coronation Road. There used to be a junction with Kwong Wah Street, which was removed during the reconstruction of Kwong Wah Hospital around 1958. The street, at the east end, extends beyond Waterloo Road to Chun Yi Lane, but the dual carriageway of Waterloo Road blocks the direct traffic between the street and the lane.

Tung Wah Group of Hospitals Lo Yu Chik Primary School, formerly the site of old Kwong Wah Hospital, is located west side of current hospital. The high-rise of Chinese YWCA is also the location of YMCA College of Careers and a hotel The Cityview.

The latest reconstruction of Kwong Wah Hospital relocated Emergency Department, together with its entrance, from Waterloo Road to Pitt Street in 2023. All emergency traffic was re-routed through the street.

== History ==
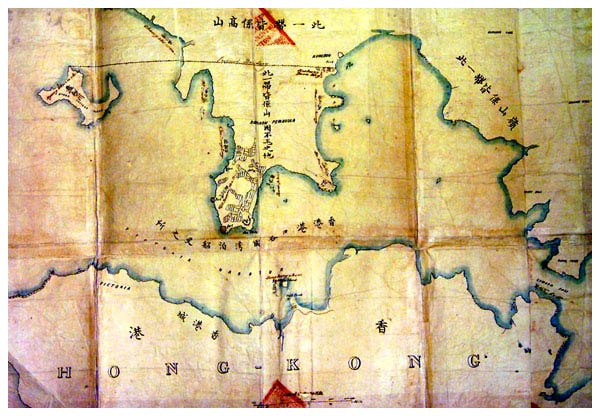
Kowloon Peninsula. Map of Convention of Peking.

Great Britain took Kowloon Peninsula from China in 1860 under Convention of Peking. The development started from Tsim Sha Tsui, nearest location to the City of Victoria of Hong Kong Island and extended northward, Kwun Chung, Yau Ma Tei, Mong Kok Tsui, Mong Kok, and Tai Kok Tsui. Before the urban planning of Kowloon, Mong Kok Tsui became a rural settlement outside the urban Kowloon, increasingly populated, as illustrated in the map of Water Supply Kowloon Peninsula Central Plan. British secured New Territories from China with Convention for the Extension of Hong Kong Territory in 1898. With vast new land north of the peninsula, this fuelled the development of Kowloon.

=== Reclamation and development of Yau Ma Tei, Mong Kok Tsui and Mong Kok ===
In 19th century, the reclamation and development north of Yaumati Police Station was centred with the extension of Station Street, which later renamed to Shanghai Street.

By 1901, Kowloon map illustrated the street, as yet unnamed, branched east and west from Station Street. This location was considered situating in Mong Kok Tsui for exact and Yau Ma Tei, formerly written as Yaumati, for large area in this period.

By 1910, another Kowloon map showed cluster of streets with name related to Britain, including Pitt Street, along with Waterloo Road, Hamilton Street, Dundas Street, Portland Street, Nelson Street, Argyle Street and Fife Street.

In 1913 report, a gas lamp was erected near a steam laundry. In 1927 report, a sugar factory was built on Kowloon Marine Lot 48 and a knitting factory on 50.

=== Yaumati Disinfecting Station ===
Following the 1894 Hong Kong plague, there were several outbreak of bubonic plague. Disinfecting stations were constructed to fight against the disease by disinfecting houses and clothes, with inspectors stationed.

The Public Works began to build Yaumati Disinfecting Station with quarters for inspector on Pitt Street, which remained unnamed, in 1904 and completed it in 1905, handing over to Sanitary Board in April.

In 1912 report, the Public Works laid a 9" earthenware pipe sewer in Pitt Street and Waterloo Road from opposite the Yaumati Disinfecting Station to take the drainage from the new Sanitary Department Stables.

=== Kwong Wah Hospital, Tung Wah Group of Hospitals, Lo Yu Chik Primary School and Tung Wah Museum ===
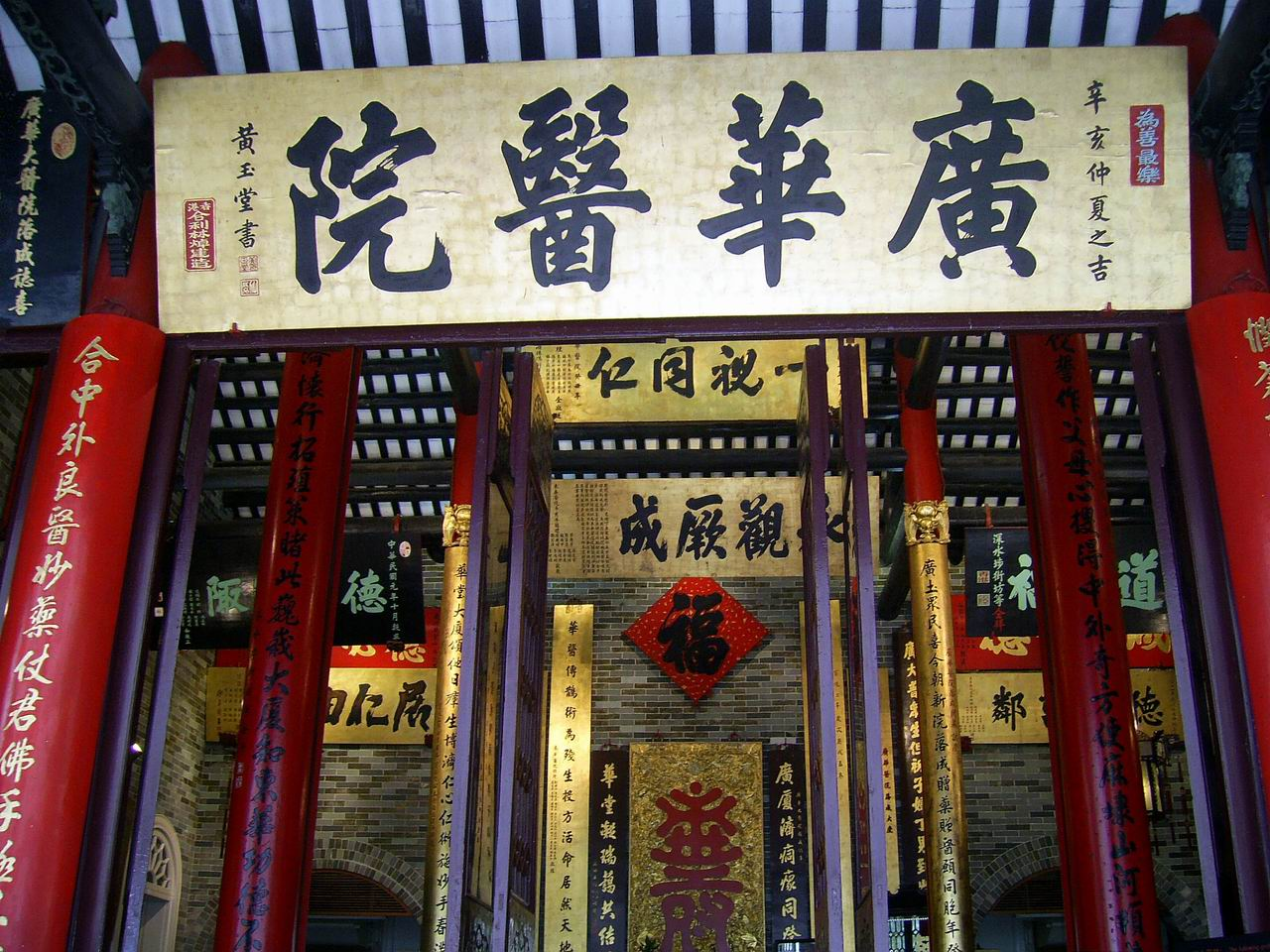
Old Hall of Kwong Wah Hospital

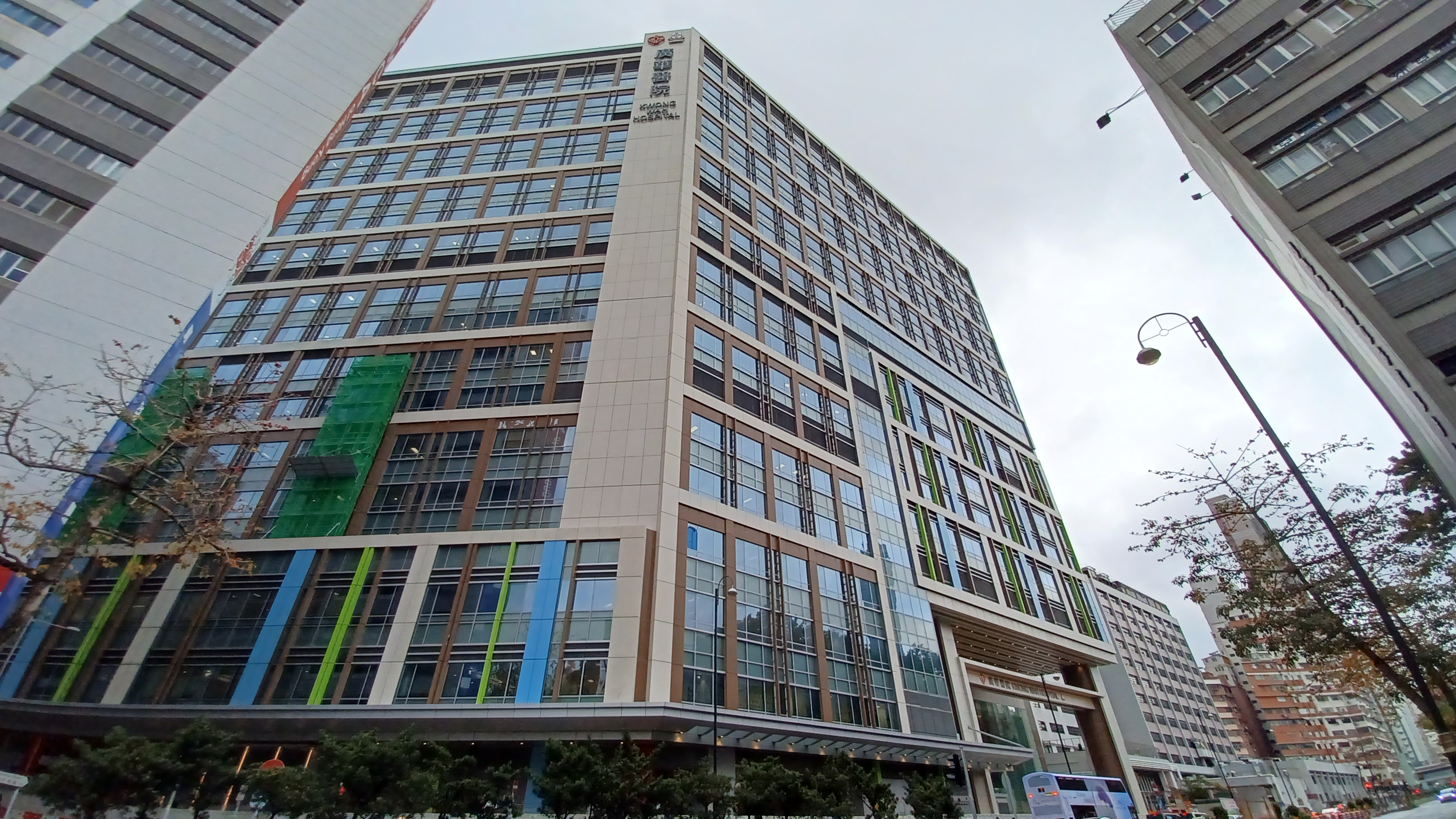
Kwong Wah Hospital after reconstruction 2023

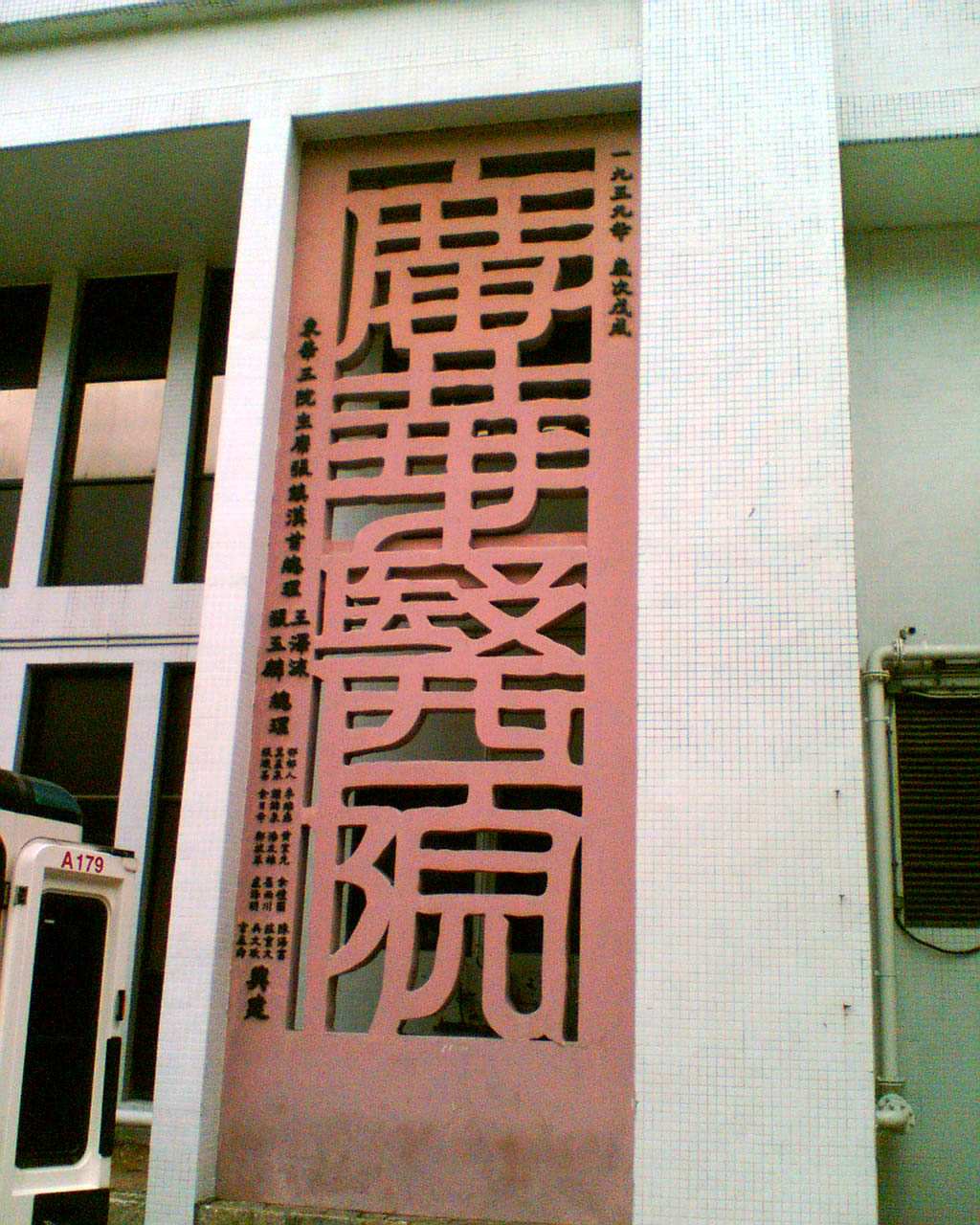
Sign of Kwong Wah Hospital, 1959

By the time of extension to the New Territories in 1898, there was no hospital for Chinese. Kai Ho proposed a hospital in Kowloon. In response to the proposal, the government offered the location of Yaumati Disinfecting Station and provided initial funds for five years in 1907. The Governor Sir Frederick Lugard, opened the hospital on 9 October 1911, reported in The China Mail.

In 1915, there was budget to improve Pitt Street opposite to Kwong Wah Hospital. In 1925 report, the street extended west to the Kwong Wah Hospital on Kowloon Inland Lot 1213. In 1926, New block of Kwong Wah Hospital was built on Kowloon Inland Lot 1213 on the street. In 1958, there was a reconstruction of the hospital and a nurse school, moving the hospital eastward by the side of Waterloo Road, demolishing a section of Kwong Wah Street, and rebuilding the hospital with a high rise building. This resulted in a free land, on the west boundary, of 99 000 square feet of land, returned to the government. The government in return gave it to Tung Wah Group of Hospital to build a school, namely Lo Yu Chik Primary School. The lane beside the school, namely Yau Mong Lane, is a busy shortcut from Pitt Street to Dundas Street.

Another reconstruction of Kwong Wah Hospital relocated Emergency Department, together with its entrance, from Waterloo Road to Pitt Street in 2023.

Tung Wah Museum is the original hall of Tung Wah Hospital in 1911. It serves as a museum with records of Tung Wah Group of Hospitals.

=== Pitt Street Dust/Refuse Boat Station and pier ===
The street used to be leading to praya wall, namely sea wall. In 1923, the Public Works Department issued a tender to construct a pier for dust shoot at the end of the street. It was later mentioned as Pitt Street Refuse Boat Station in 1933 report and Pitt Street Dust Boat Station in 1947-48 report. The old refuse pier was finally demolished, mentioned in 1961-62 report.

=== Wah Yah College, Kowloon ===
In 1924, Peter Tsui Yan Sau initially set up Wah Yan College, Kowloon, a Catholic secondary school, on 70 Portland Street at the junction with Pitt Street. The school was later moved Nelson Street and finally settled at current premises on 56 Waterloo Road.

=== Chinese YMCA, YMCA International House, The Cityview and YMCA College of Careers ===
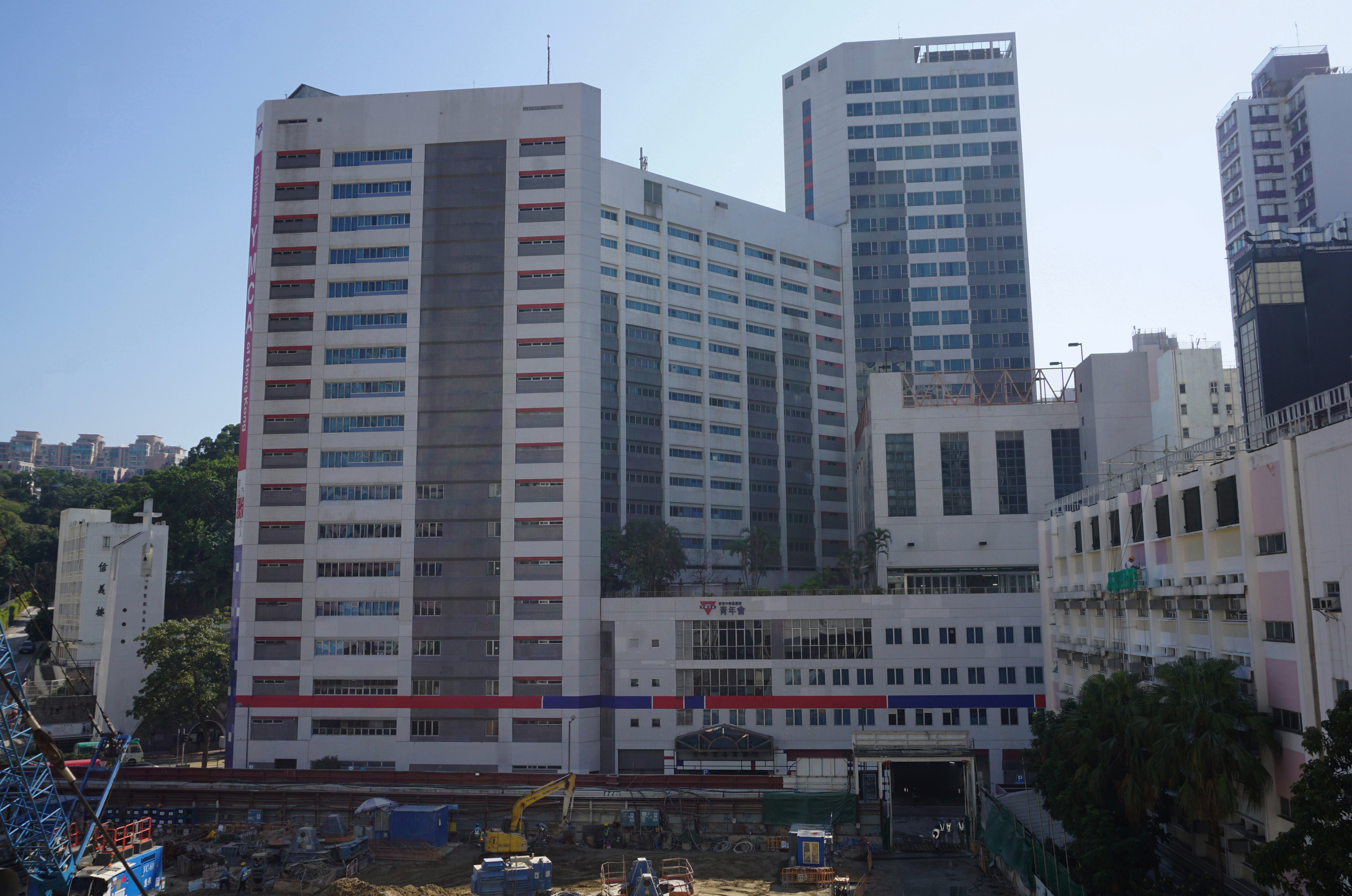
Full view of Chinese YMCA on Pitt Street during reconstruction of Kwong Wah Hospital

Chinese YMCA, formerly written as Chinese Y.M.C.A., initially serving mainly the Island side of Hong Kong. In 1928 the association began to build a hostel and hall on Kowloon Inland Lot 1483, on Waterloo Road and Pitt Street, and the construction was completed in 1929. The Kowloon Branch began services in Kowloon side. In 1966, the headquarters moved into here and new building was erected, with a programme centre, a gymnasium and YMCA International House. The building was expanded in 1993. The international house was a hostel, which rebranded to The Cityview, a 4-star hotel. A continuous education centre was established and later became YMCA College of Careers, a registered school.

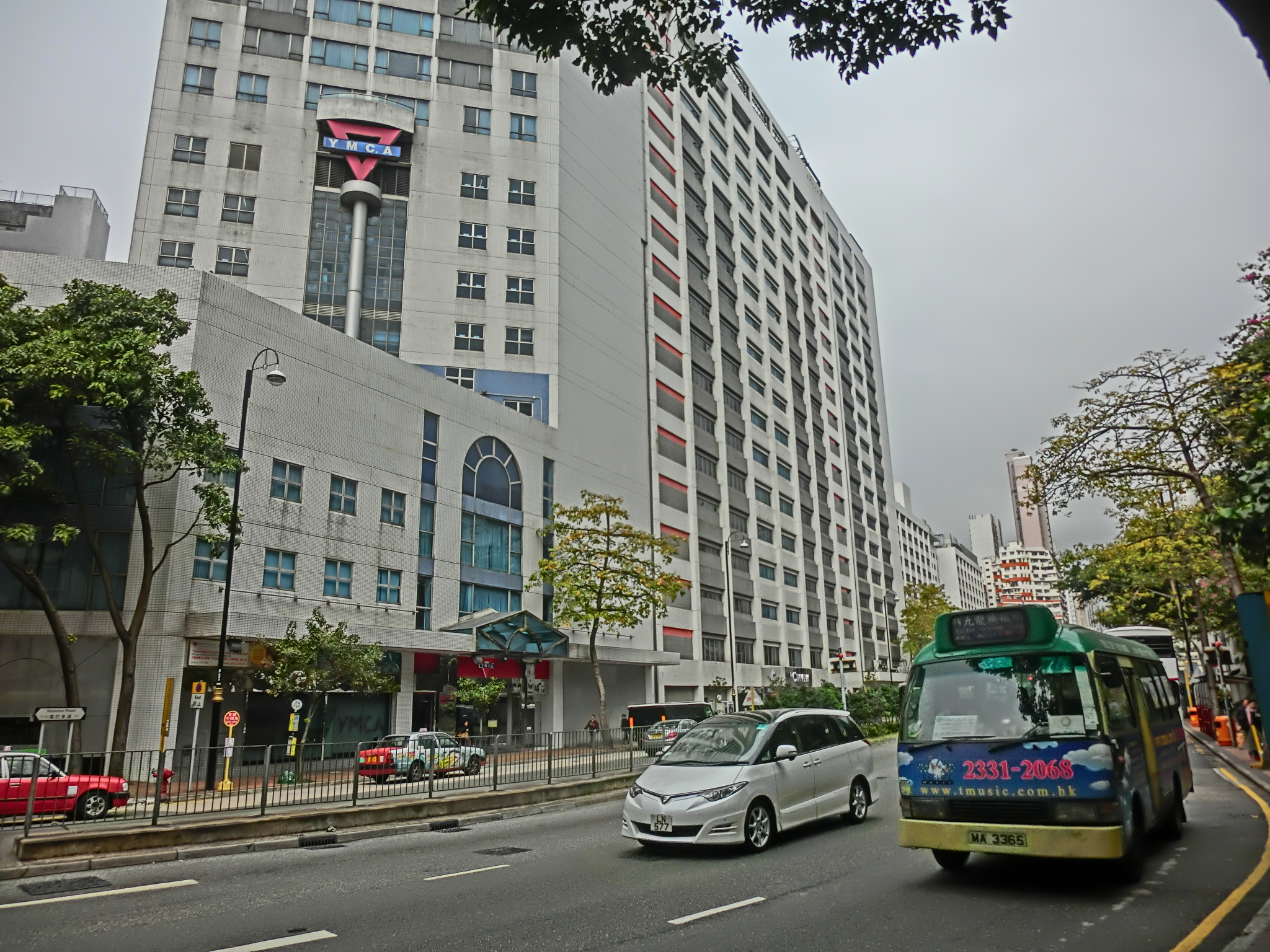
Waterloo Road view of Chinese YMCA

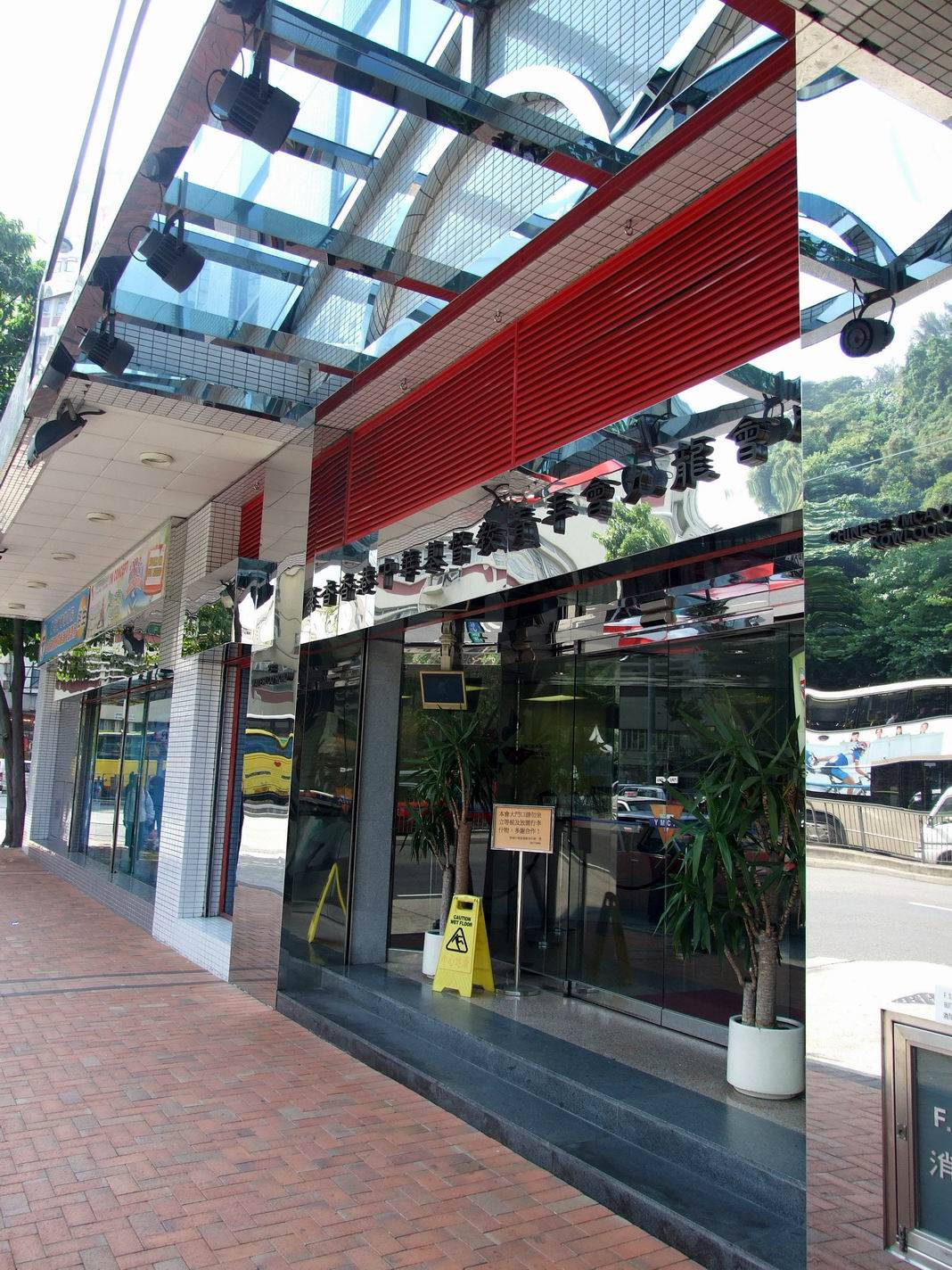
Entrance of Kowloon Centre

=== Kowloon Telephone Exchange, Bell House, London Restaurant, Mk1 Super Digital Mall and MediLink Square ===
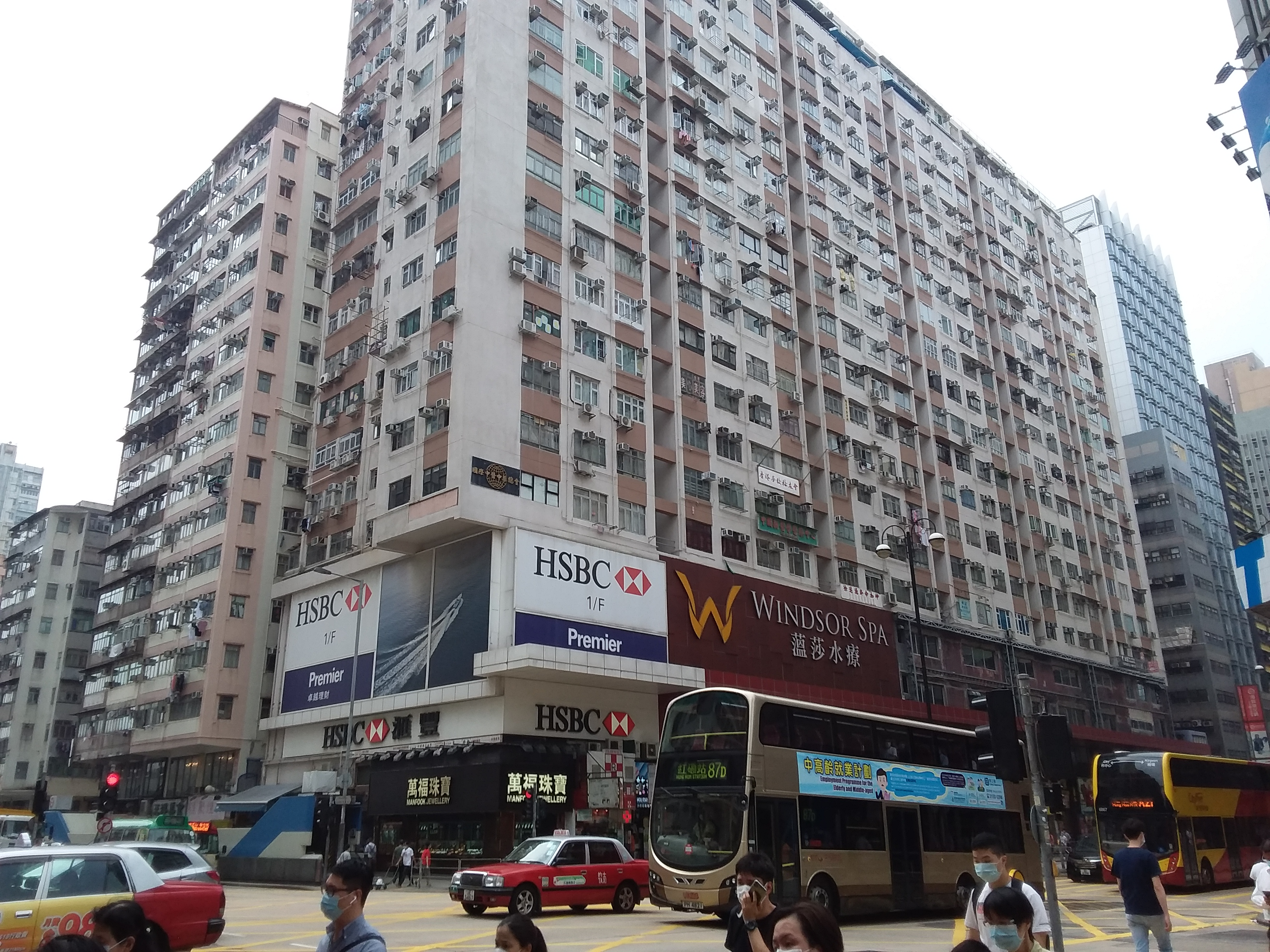
Bell House

In 1929, a telephone exchange and staff quarters was completed on Kowloon Inland Lot 754 on Nathan Road, spanning between Waterloo Road and Pitt Street. It was known as the Kowloon Telephone Exchange of the Hong Kong Telephone. This building was demolished on or before 1963, replaced by a commercial and residential building, Bell House, which named after Alexander Graham Bell, the inventor of telephone. The building is 200 feet high, with twenty-storey in six block.

London Restaurant, a large Chinese restaurant, occupying a few floors, opened in 1960s. It soon became a major restaurant in Yau Ma Tei/Mong Kok, having branches in Mong Kok and Hung Hom. The restaurant closed after 27 years in 2005, with 200 workers losing their jobs, and only the Mong Kok one remains open. The Mong Kok restaurant became a tourist hotspot.

The floors of the restaurant once was converted to a shopping centre, first Mk1 Super Digital Mall, selling digital products, then MediLink Square, selling medical products, and later MediLink Square was occupied by a spa and sauna, Windsor Spa.

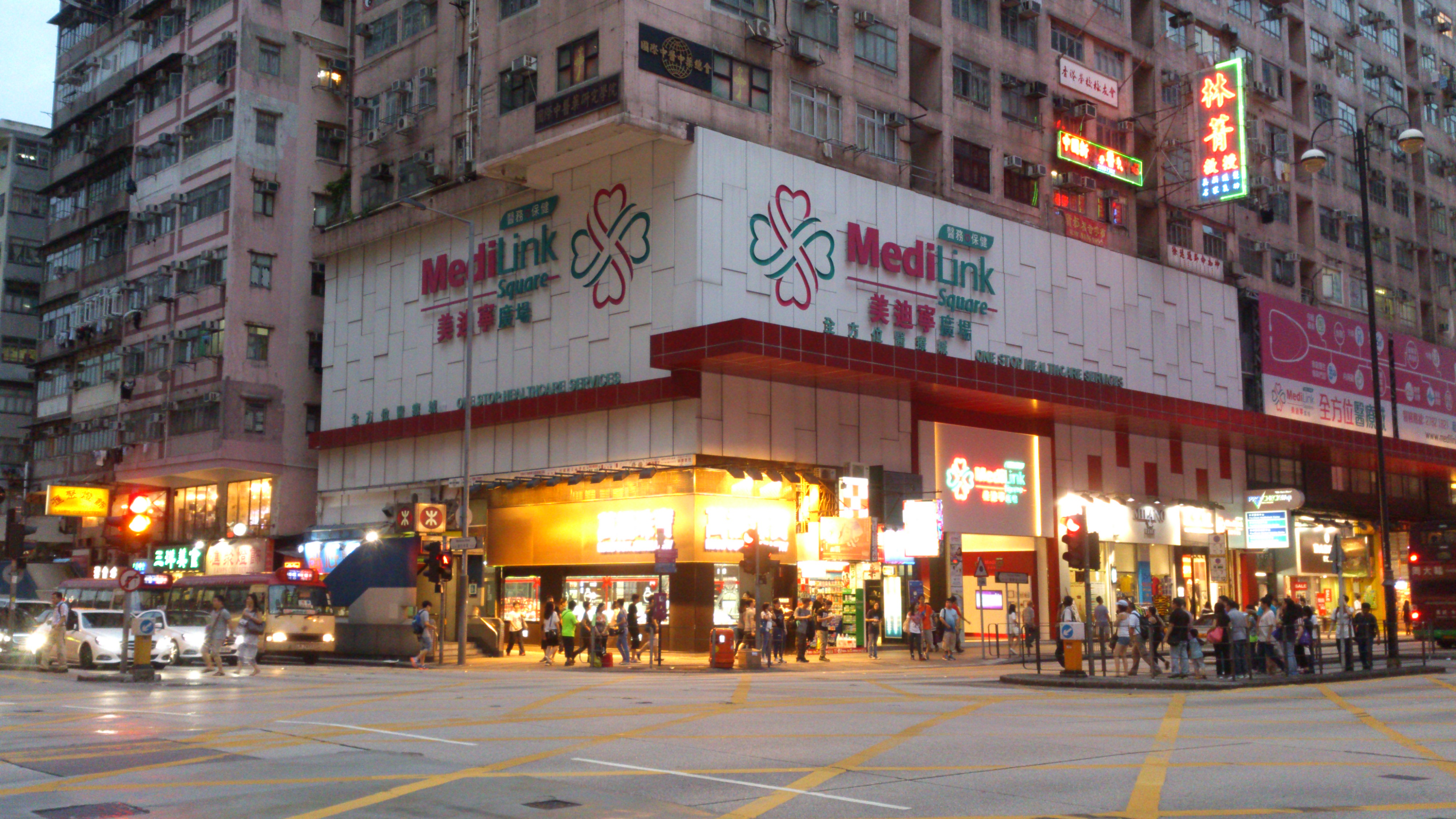
MediLink Square

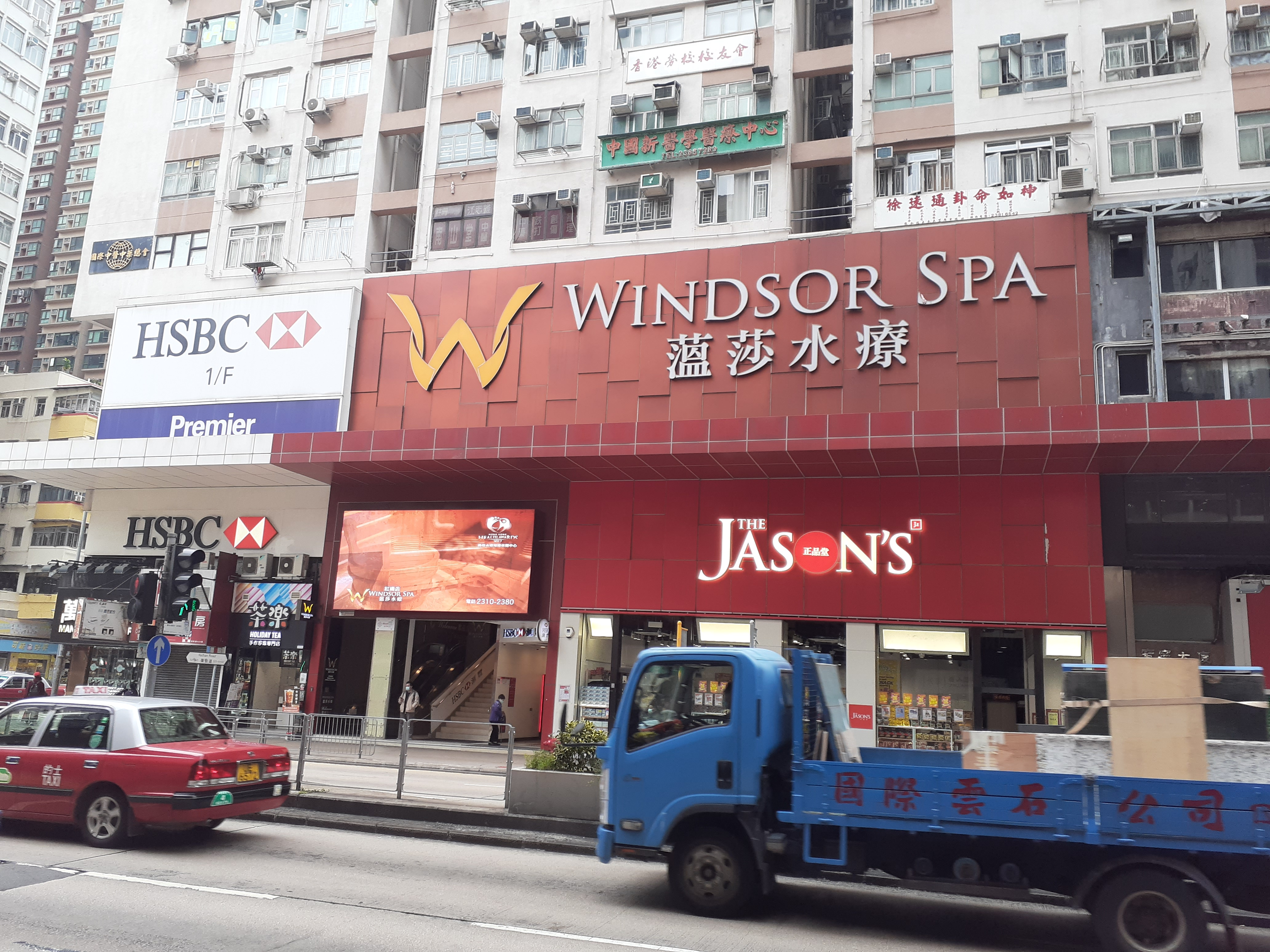
Spa at the former location of London Restaurant

=== Tak Yu Restaurant and Tak Yue Mansion ===
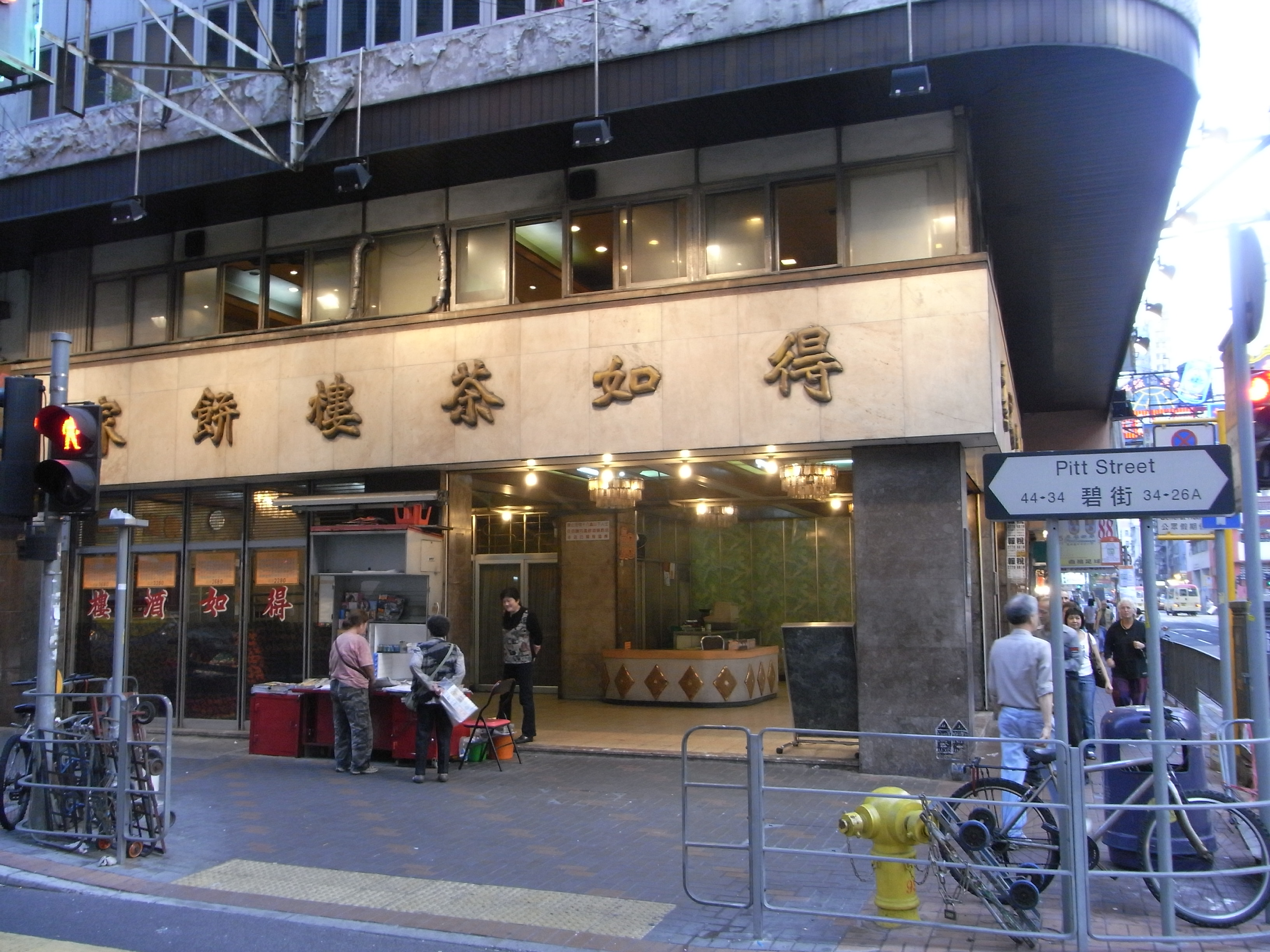
Tak Yu Restaurant

In 1920s, Tak Yu Restaurant, one of oldest restaurants in Hong Kong, was built at 372-378A Shanghai Street, at the southeast corner of the junction with Pitt Street. In 1967, the restaurant was rebuilt as a high-rise Tak Yue Mansion, with the restaurant continuing its operation on lower floors. In 2012, the restaurant ceased to operate and the whole building was sold in 2019 and later the premises of the restaurant turning into a care home.

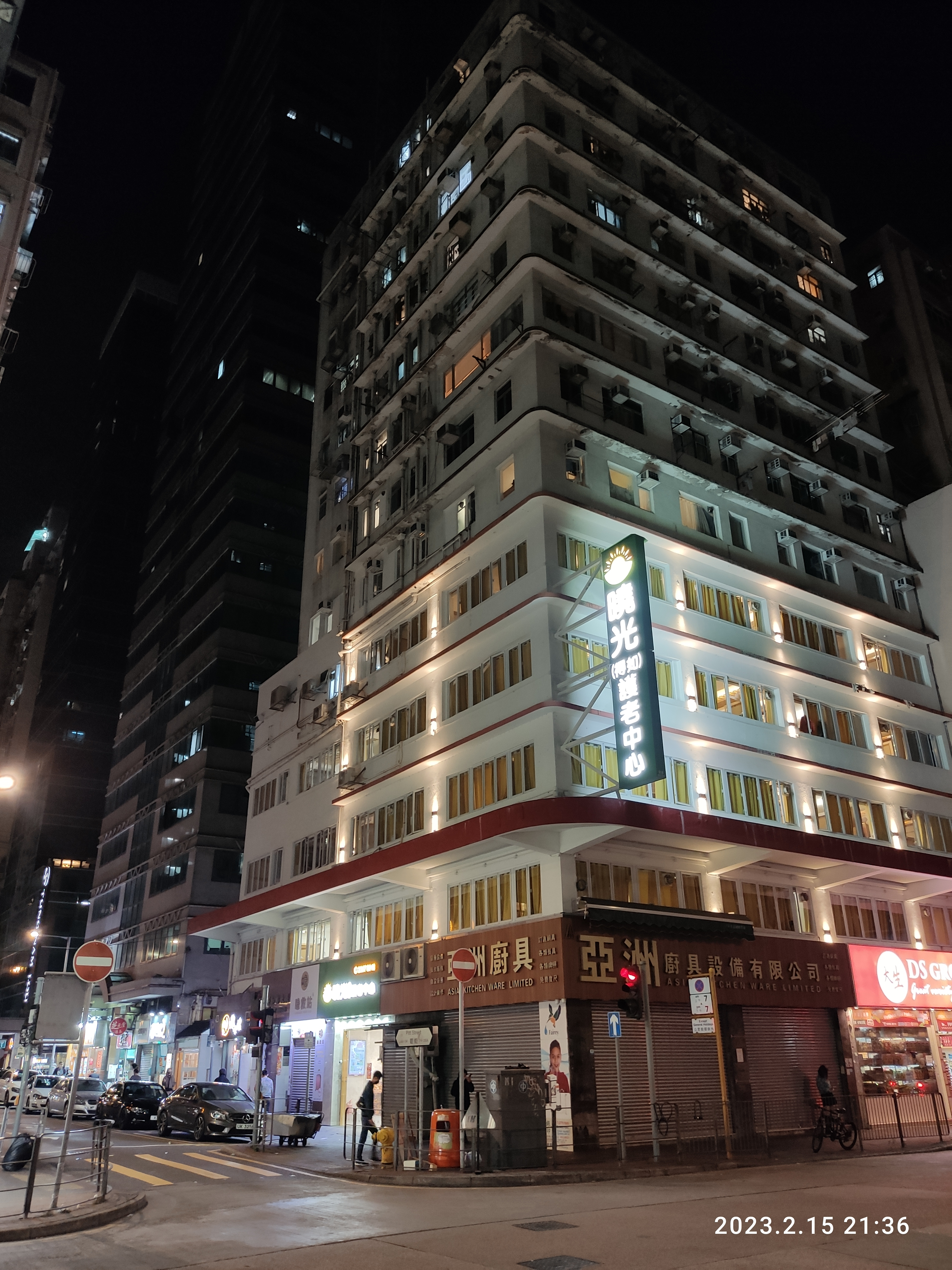
Tak Yu Mansion

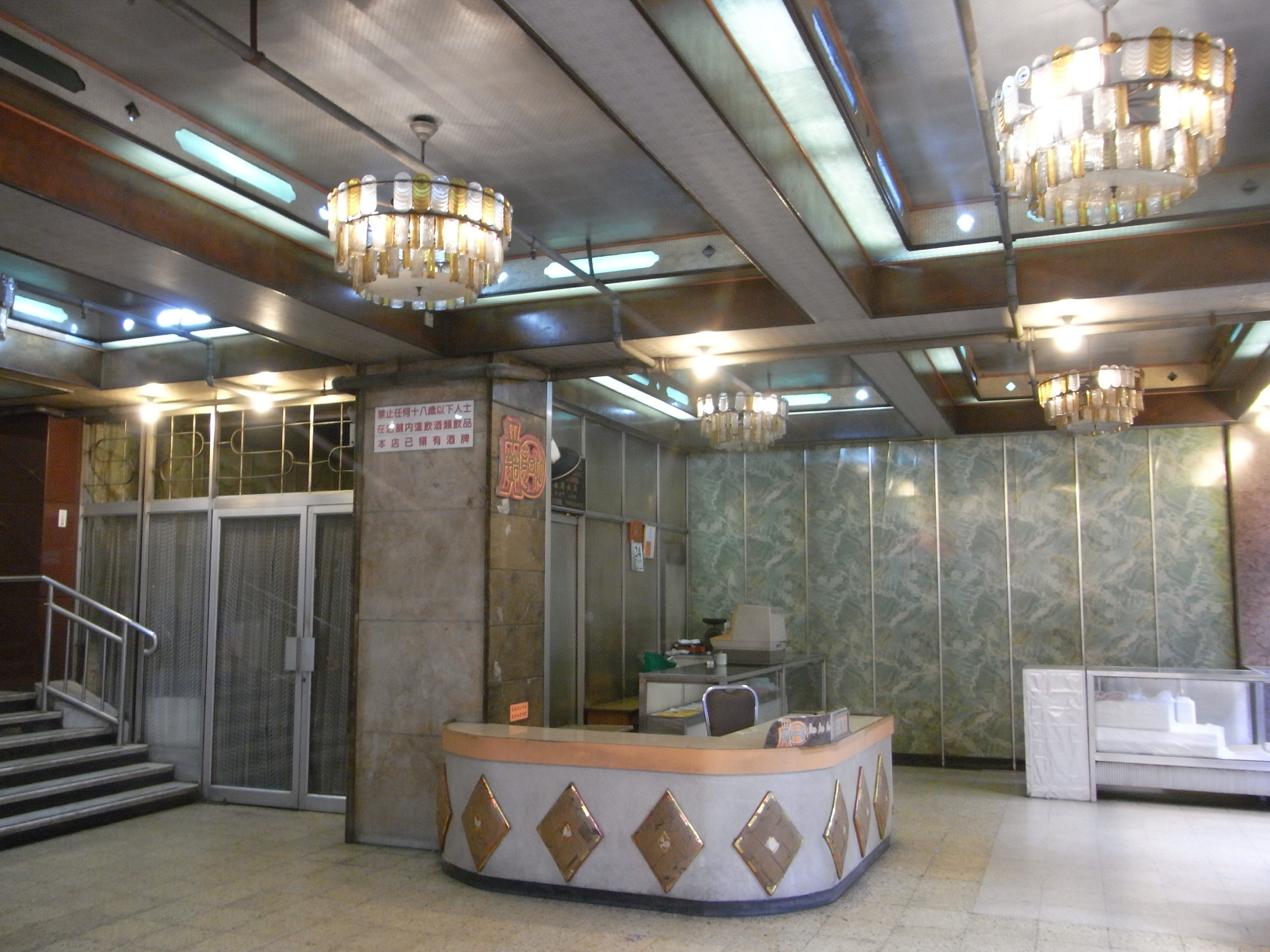
Interior of Tak Yu Restaurant, Ground Floor

=== Tung Nam Seafood Restaurant, Tung Nam Commercial Centre and Tung Nam Lou Art Hotel ===
In 1950, Tung Nam Seafood Restaurant was established, providing traditional Cantonese cuisine. In 1994, the restaurant was rebuilt as Tung Nam Commercial Centre, a twenty-three storey office building. In 2019, the buildings become Tung Nam Lou Art Hotel, featuring with art and culture.

=== Kam Wah Theatre and Kam Wah Building ===
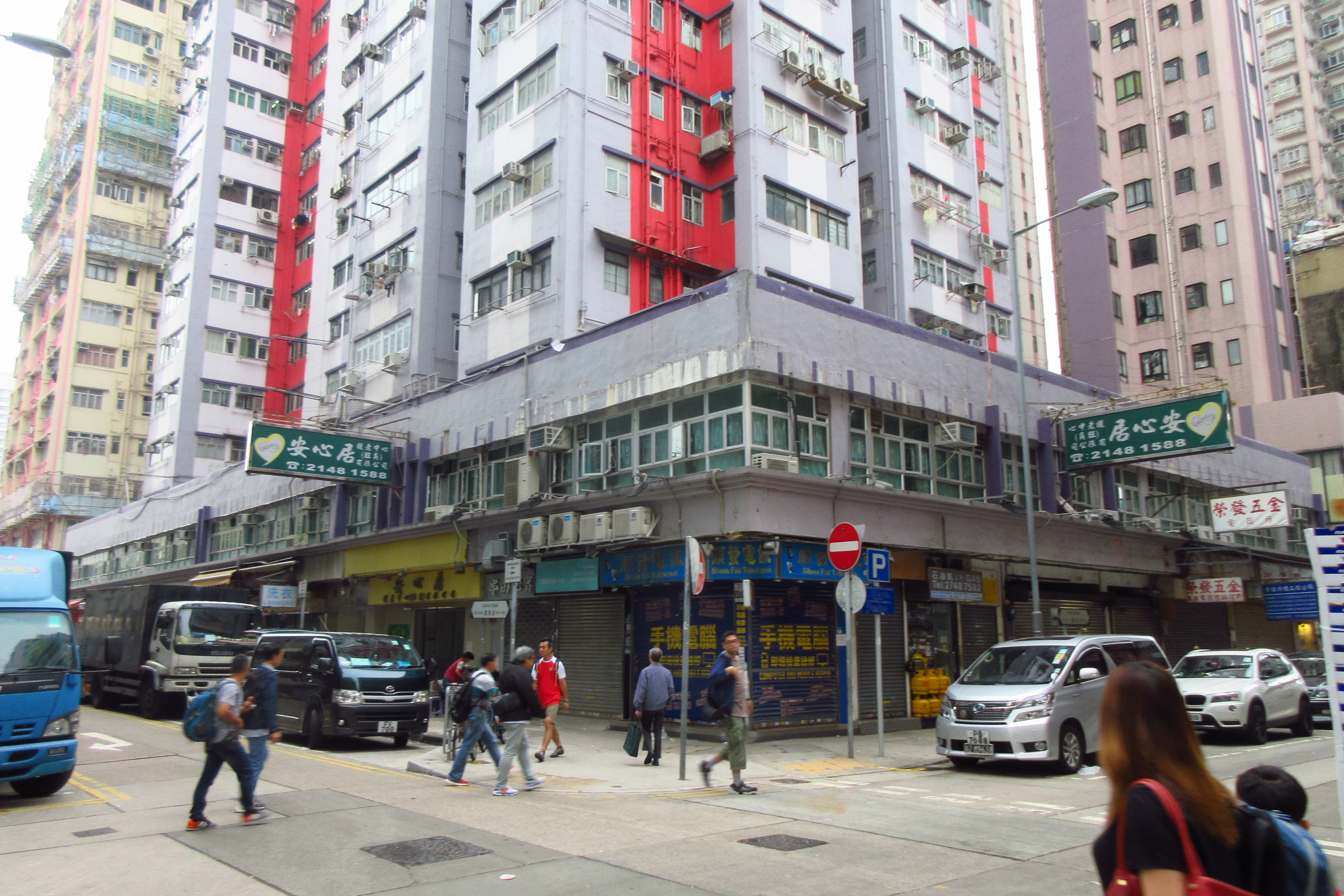
Kam Wah Building

In 1954, Kam Wah Theatre, a theatre-cinema with 2180 seats, commenced at southwest corner of the junction with Canton Road on 21 December, which operated till 21 September 1970. The theatre, of modern appearance with green and buff in colour, was designed by Iu Tak Lam. The area around theatre used to be very crowd with stalls of Dai pai dong next to it. The building was demolished and replaced with Kam Wah Building.

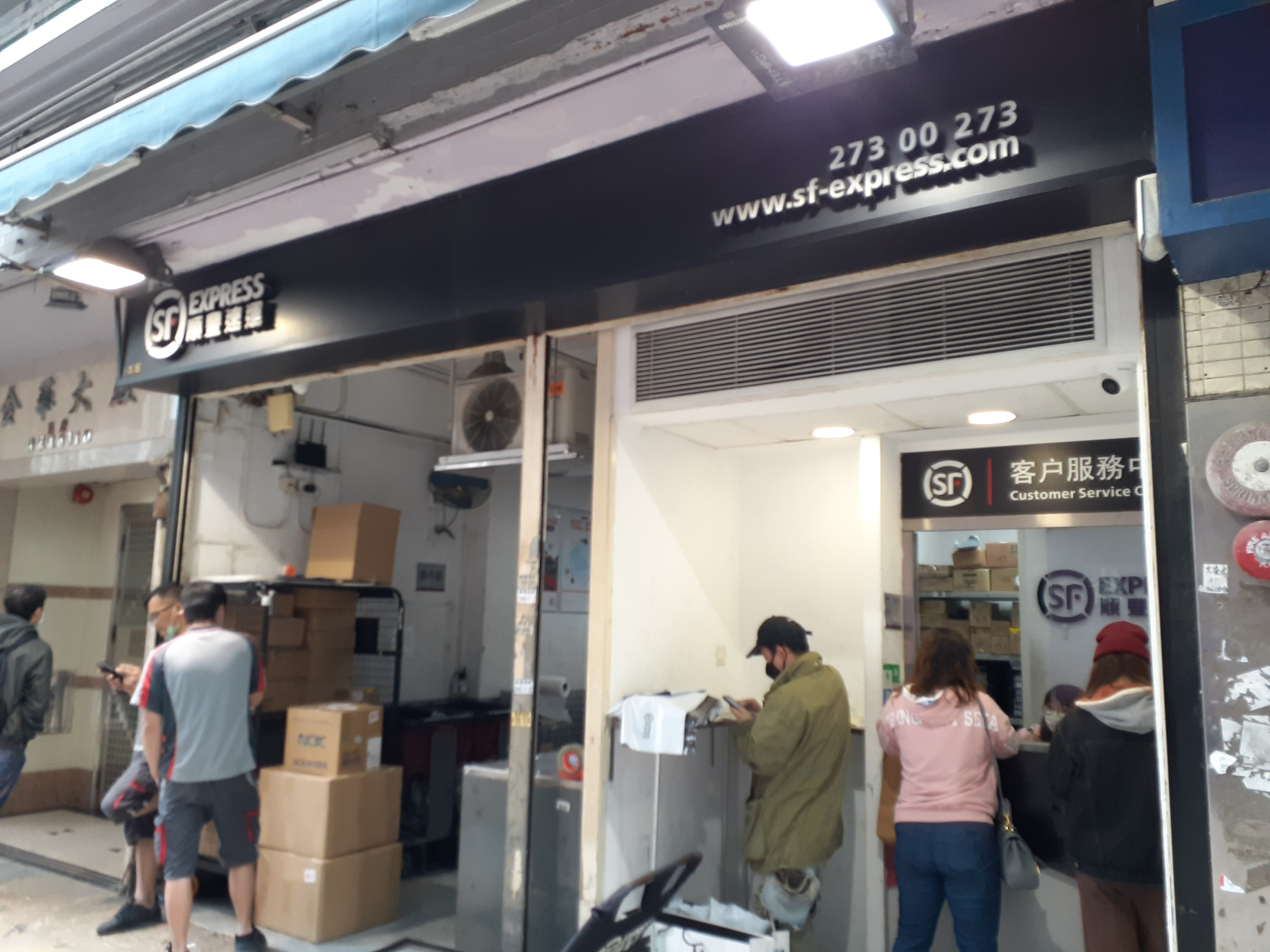
Another view of Kam Wah Building

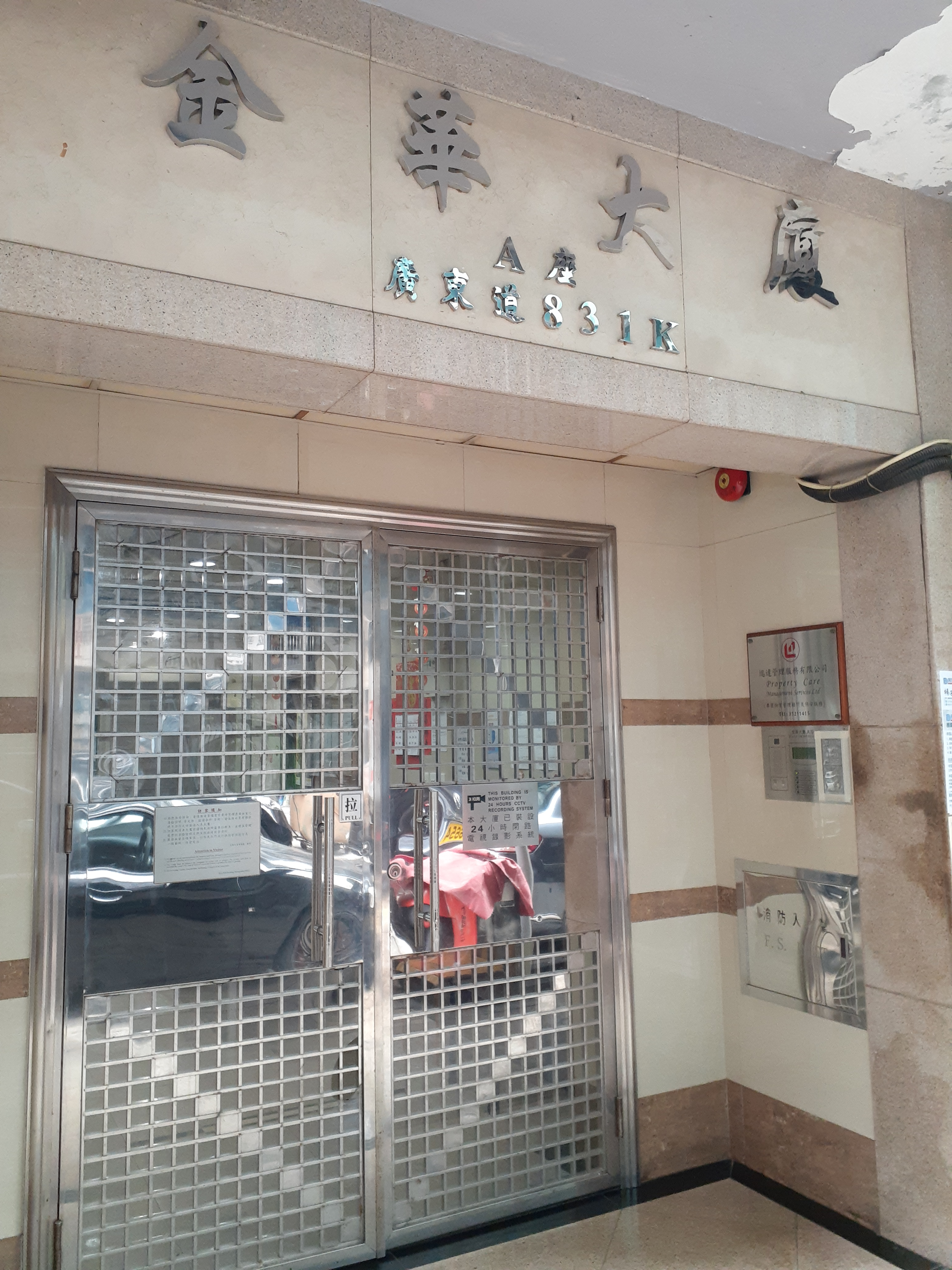
Front door to the building

=== Street market ===
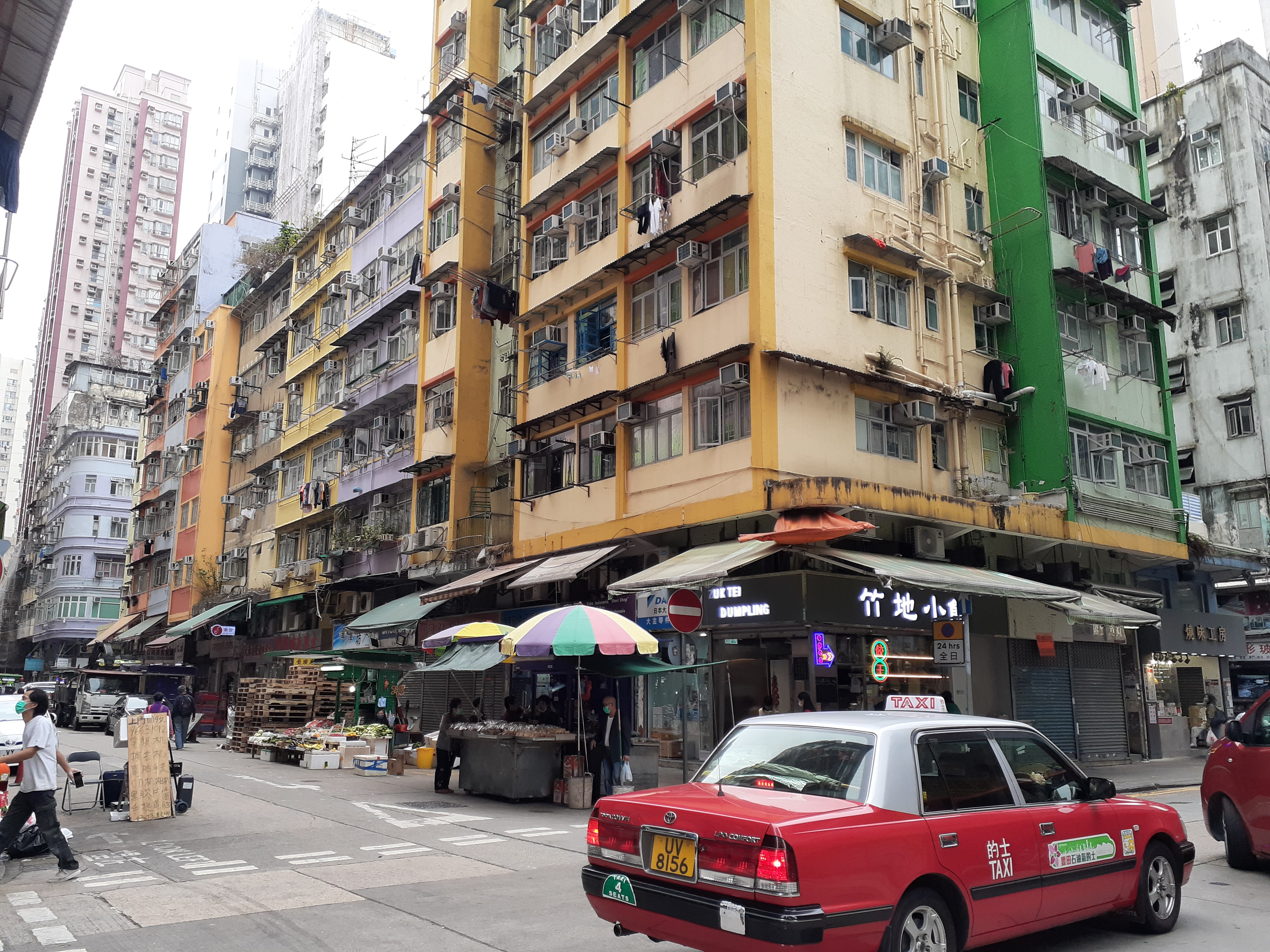
Street market

The street used to be a street market and stalls occupied sides of the street. Only a few remains because the government discourage it. The market had a lot of Dai pai dong around Kam Wa Theatre.

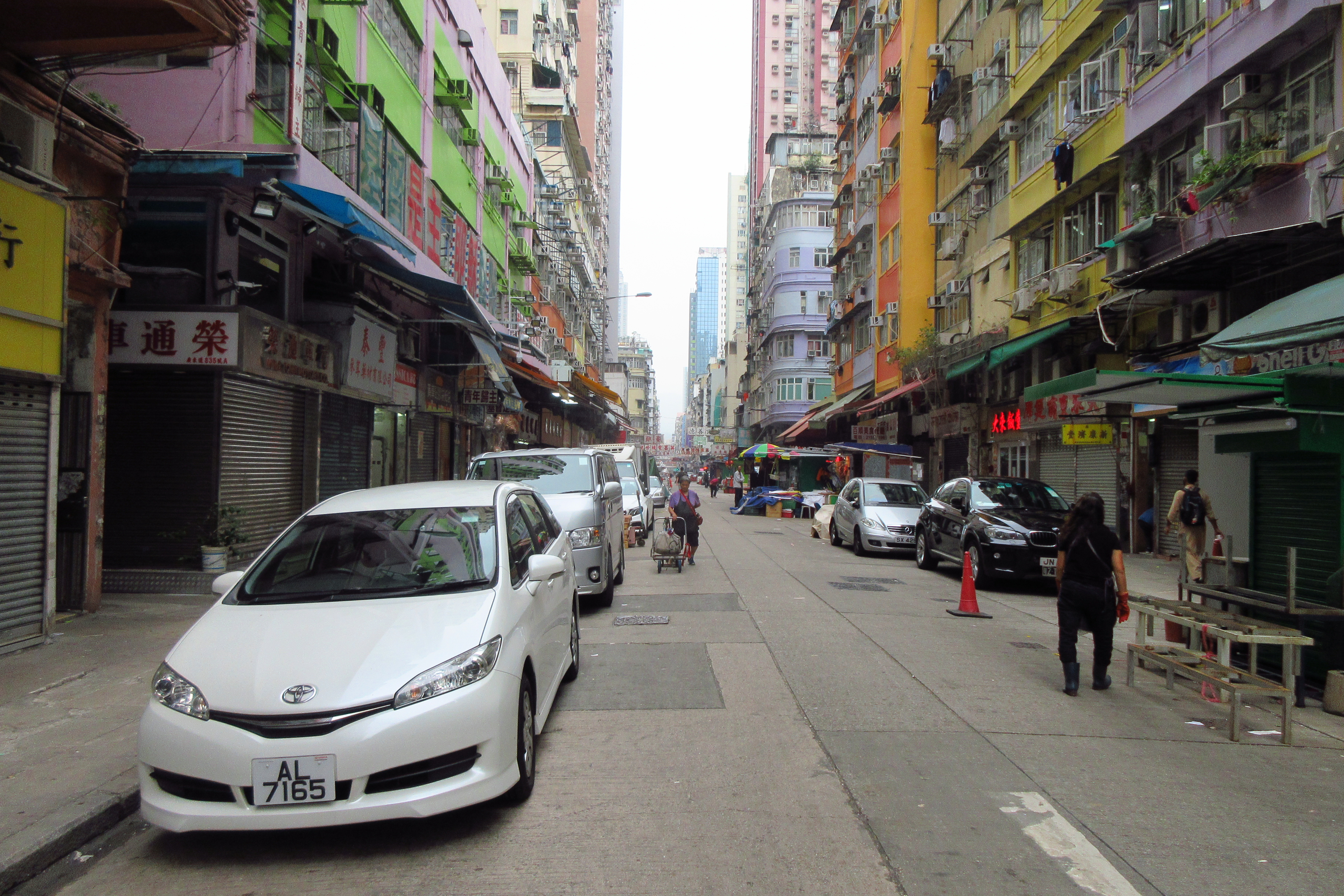
Street market

=== 1967 Riots and bombs ===
1967 Riots of Hong Kong was territory-wide and prolonged. Chinese communists in Hong Kong, encouraged by Cultural Revolution and 12-3 incident, fought against British colonial rule with homemade bombs, real or fake. On 6 September 1967, a pretentious couple intended to install a bomb on the street. Although they acted intimately, walked arm in arm, carried a paper bag, their nervous betrayed them, inviting a Chinese police inspector's suspicion. A squad of policemen followed the couple secretly, caught them and seized the bomb at the junction with Shanghai Street. Despite detonated by a bomb disposal officer, the bomb was powerful enough to break six panes of glass of a herbal tea shop. The story was reported by Wah Kiu Yat Po, and communist newspaper Ta Kung Pao, and pro-nationalist newspaper Kung Sheung Daily News.

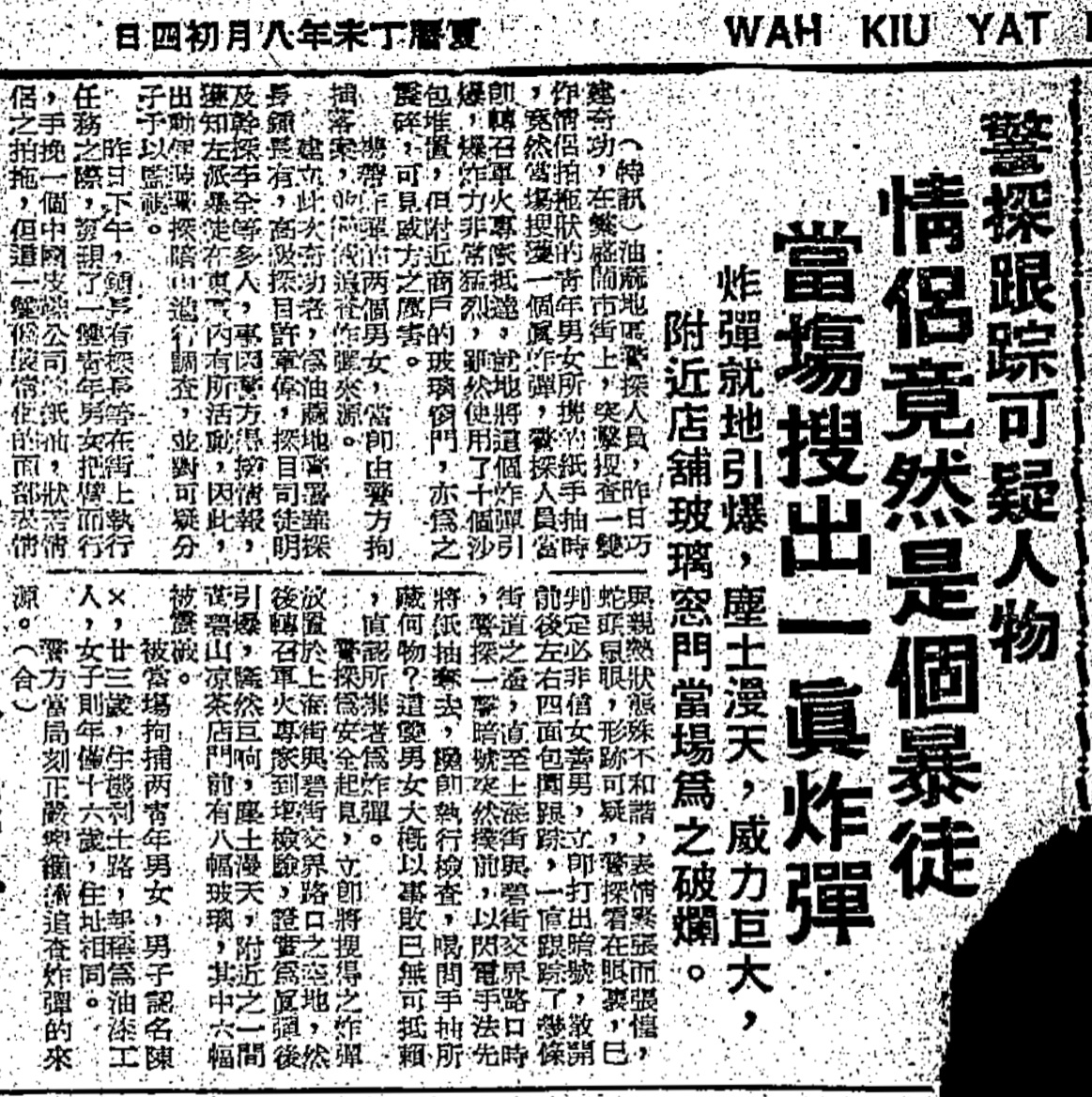
Report by Wah Kiu Yat Po

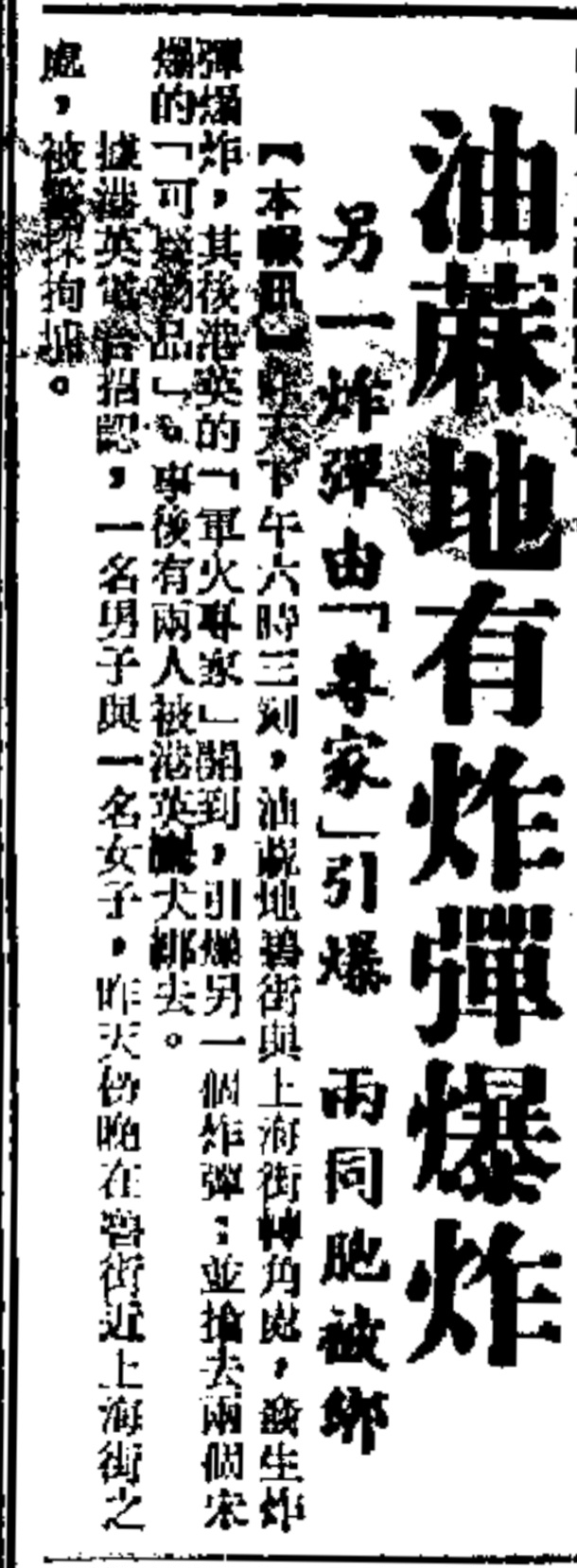
Report by Ta Kung Pao

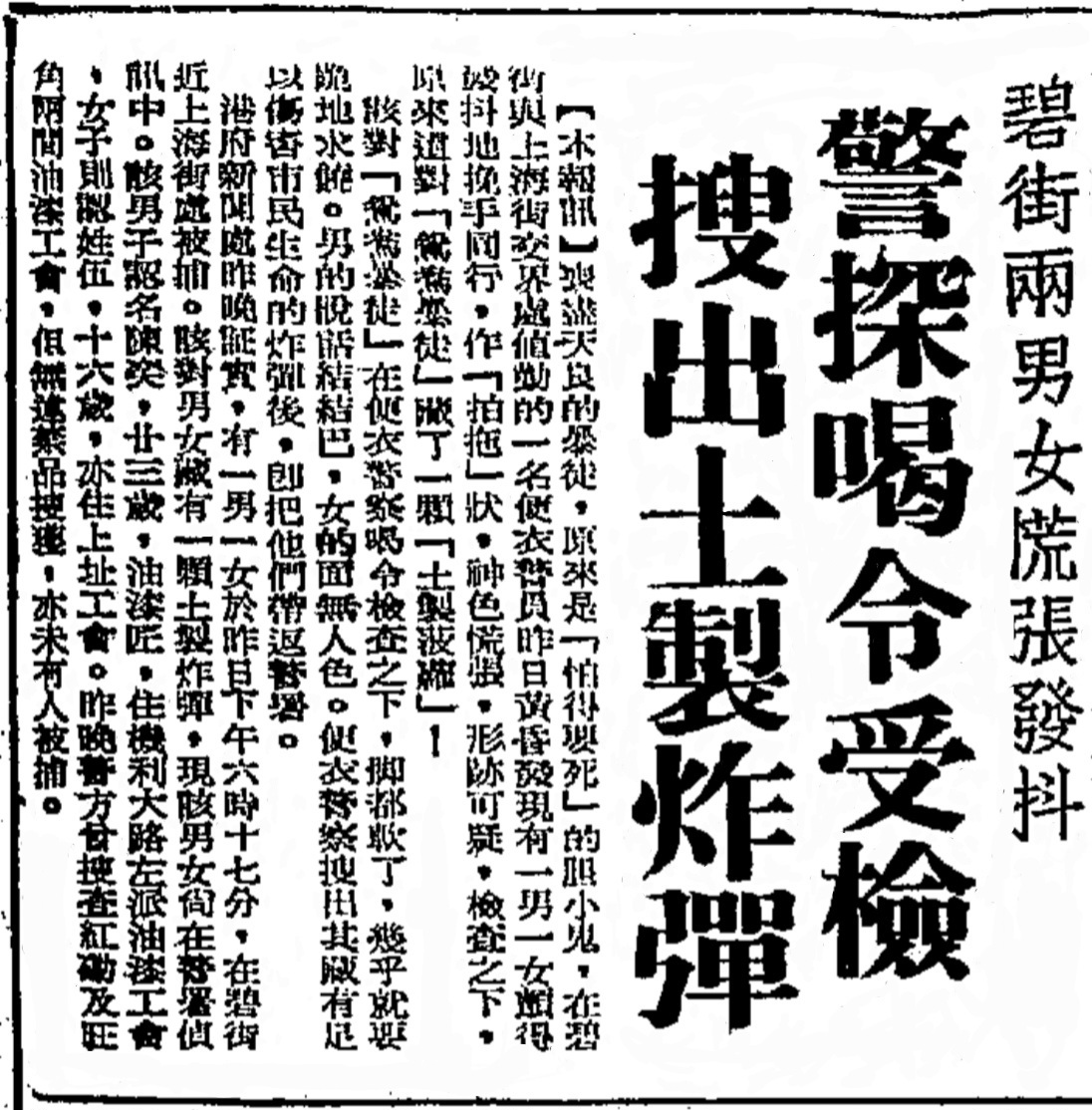
Report by Kung Sheung Daily News

=== Fire of Po Cheung Building ===
On 6 March 2021, a serious fire in Po Cheung Building, at the corner of Pitt Street and Reclamation Street, killed one man and hurt thirteen people, including a fireman. The fire began with a flat partitioned into seven dwellings with wooden broads. Residents escaped to the roof or dangerously climbed out of windows. Fire Services Department deployed 102 people and 17 fire engines to rescue. Its officers suspected that it was an arson, with sign of inflammable substance. District councillors urged a review of fire regulations on old buildings due to frequent serious fires at that time.

=== COVID-19 pandemic ===
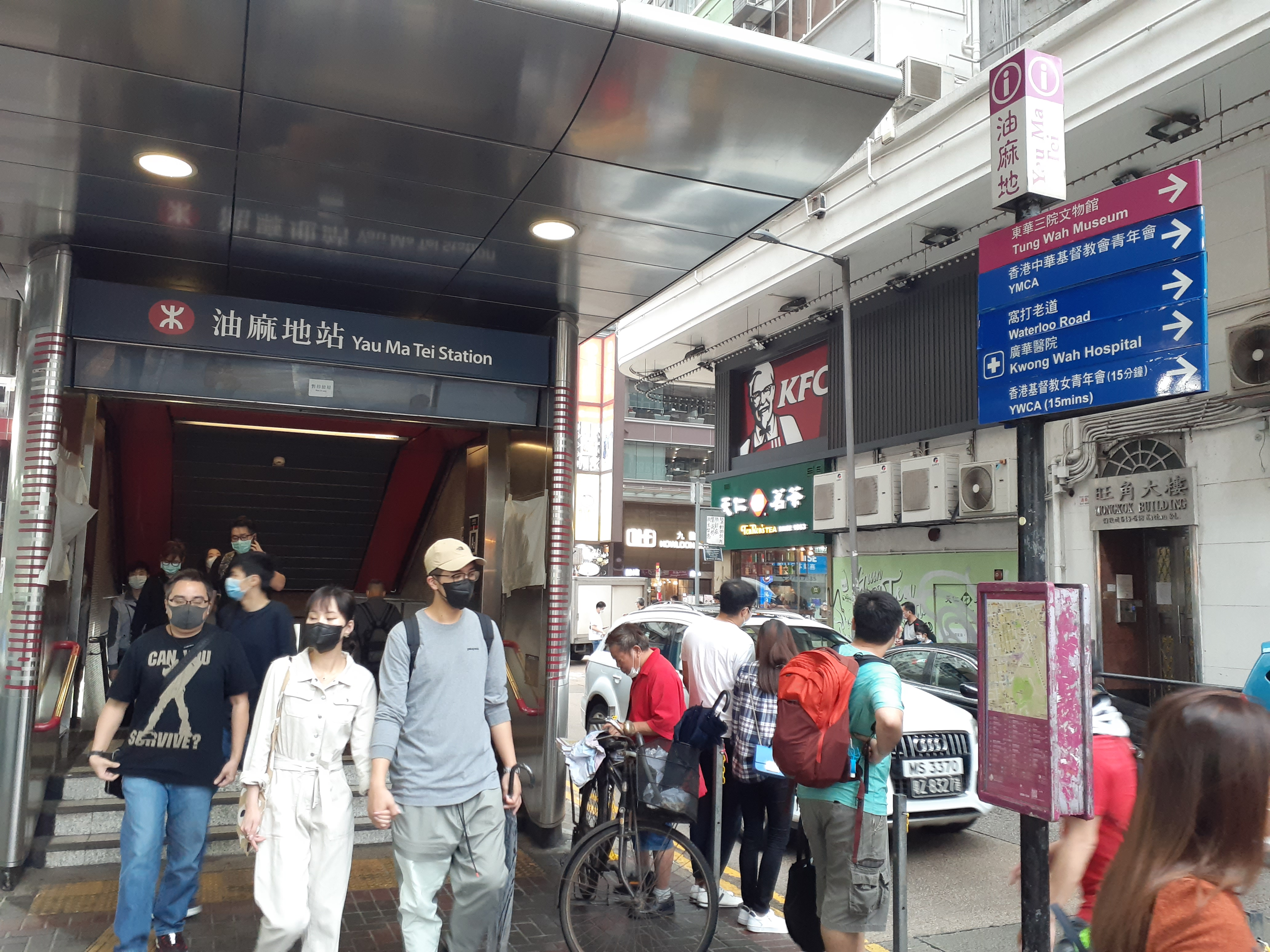
People wore face mask on Pitt Street

During COVID-19 pandemic in 2020 to 2023, there was a territory-wide panic, together with stringent regulations and enforcement. The street suffered from quarantine several times. Residents did allow to leave their home, in some periods, the area. Some shoppers on the street fled at once when heard of the quarantine news. The government would trace residents in the unresponsive residences.

=== Events ===
==== Murder of night watch worker ====
On 19 February 1930, a worker of firewood company was murdered and robbed at 9 Pitt Street, company's warehouse for storing wood, on the ground floor in the night. In the morning next day, the murder was discovered as the backdoor on the back street was broken. It was estimated thirteen Hong Kong dollars was lost.

==== Murder of coal boat worker ====
On 3 July 1933, a worker of coal boat was murdered on a back street of Pitt Street, close to praya. The victim's head was damaged by an axe.

==== Fire of oil shop ====
On 30 September 1939, an oil shop at 13 Pitt Street was burn down. A 3-year-old boy was killed in the fire. The damage cost one thousand Hong Kong dollar.

==== Murder of woman ====
On 11 November 1946, a woman living on second floor of 45 Pitt Street was robbed and murdered by several robbers. She was strangled to death.

==== Armed robbery ====
On 11 January 1950, six robbers robbed a shop with pistols at 48 Pitt Street. Robbed properties of gold and cash, were worth three hundred and sixty Hong Kong dollars at that time. The owner with police recognised one robber on Woosung Street and the police arrested the robber on 13 January. Later, other robbers are arrested on fourth floor, 16 Tung Choi Street. Six men and one woman were sentenced.

== Transportation ==
=== Road ===
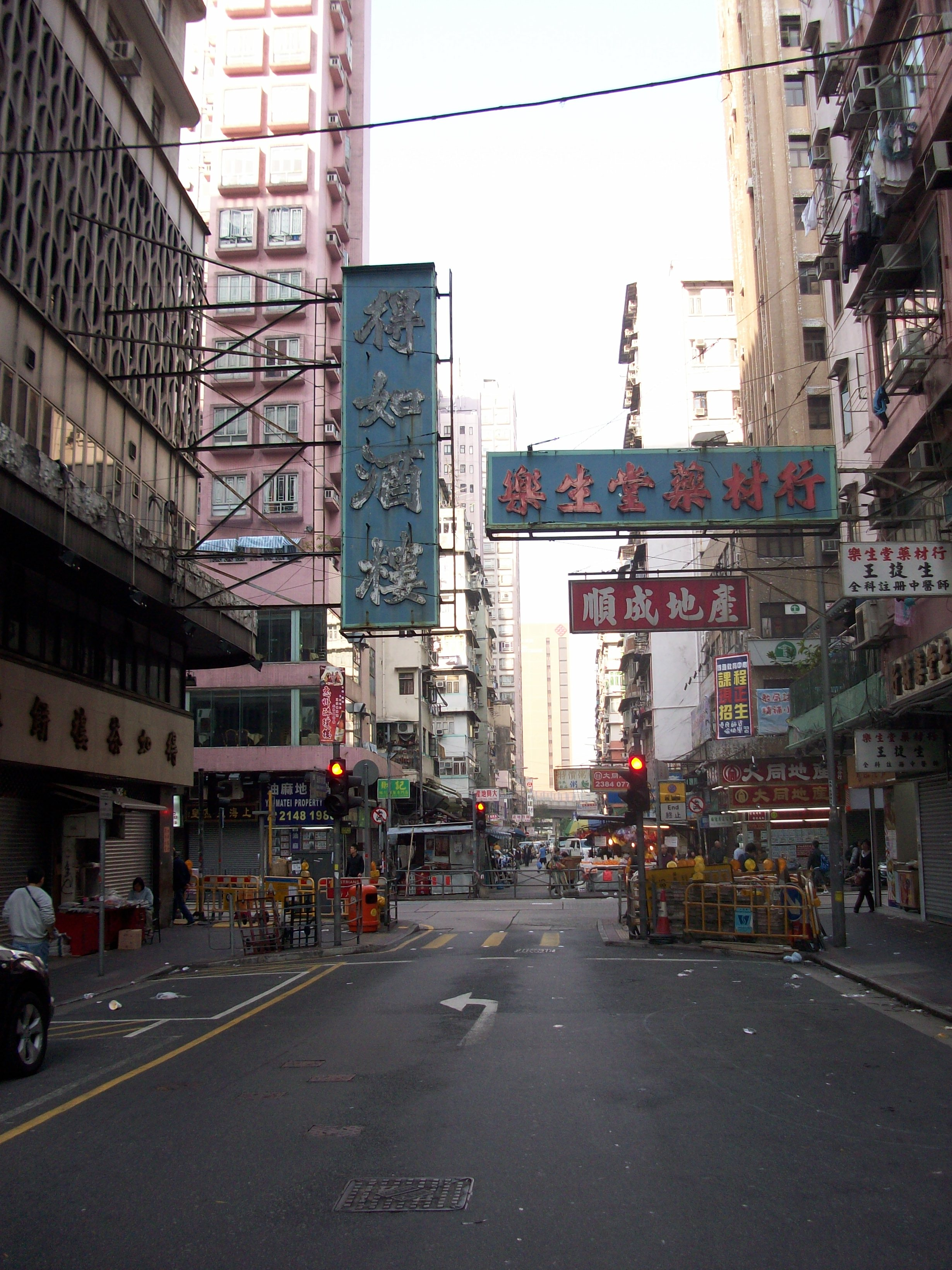
One way only

Most part of the street allows motor vehicles. Except on the west side of Nathan Road, MTR ventilation shaft and exit occupied part of the street. This section between Nathan Road and Portland Street is a cul-de-sac.

On the east side of Shanghai Street, a barrier was erected to reduce traffic in this section of street, where a small street market with several stalls on the street. This section between Shanghai Street and Reclamation Street is a cul-de-sac.

On the east side of Nathan Road, half of street is for MTR exit and a small section of the street is narrowed.

To improve the traffic in the area, all sections of the street, expect two cul-de-sac, are one-way traffic, moving from west to east.

The government designates parking spaces along the street, including some for the disabled.

The entrance to Accident and Emergency Department of Kwong Wah Hospital is on this street. A long bay of the street is provided for pick-up or drop-off for patients.

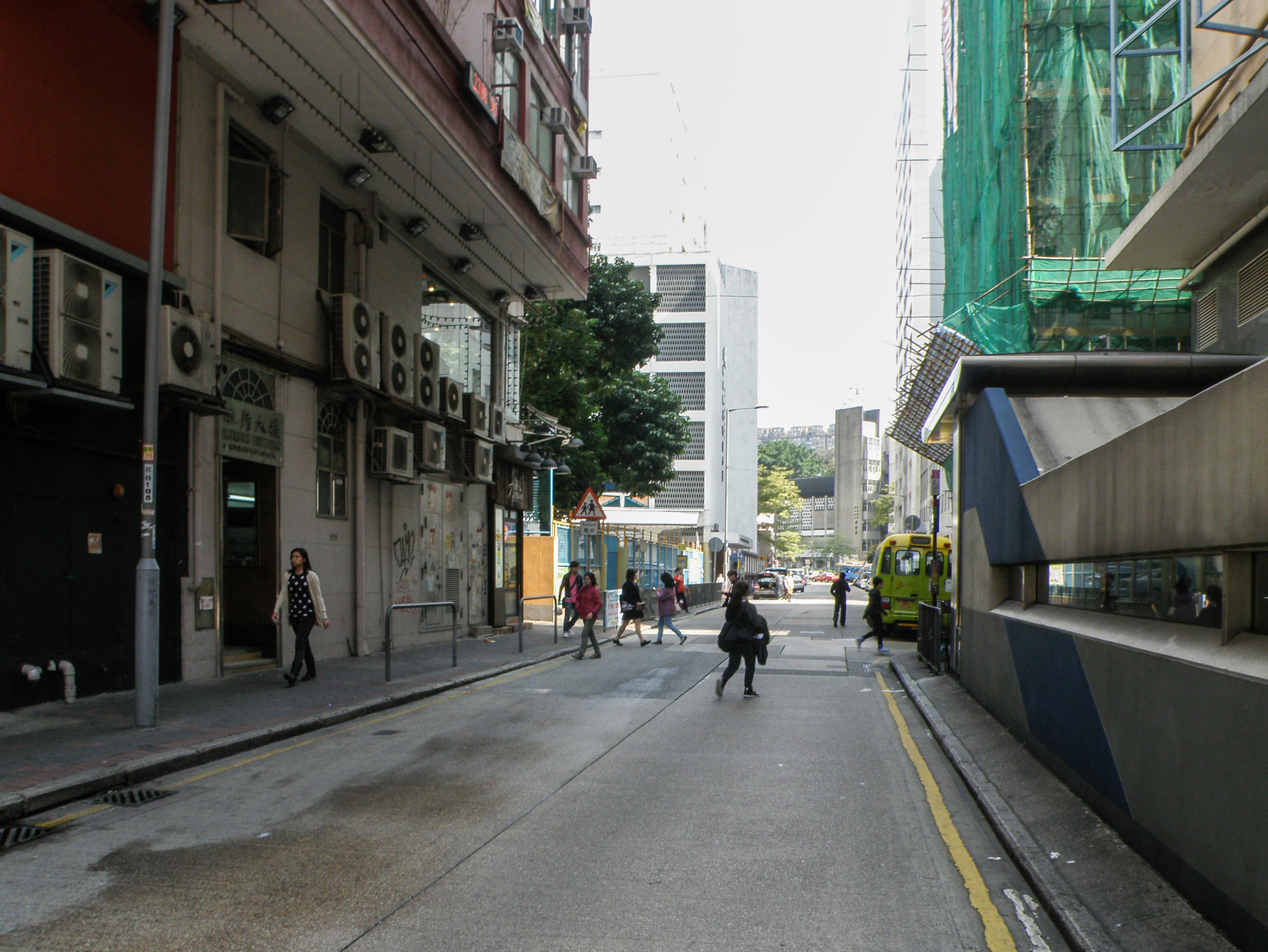
Pitt Street, east section

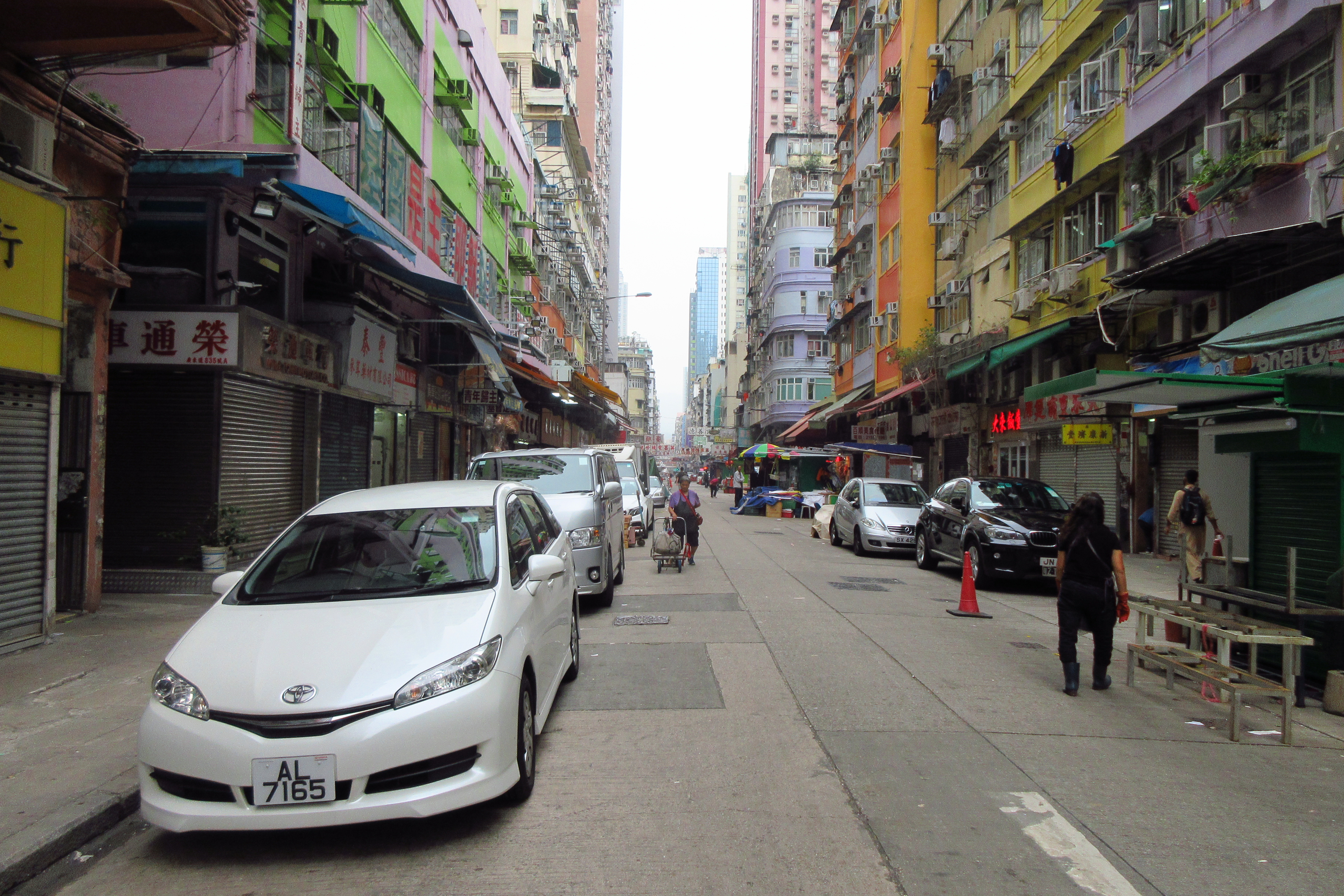
Pitt Street, west section

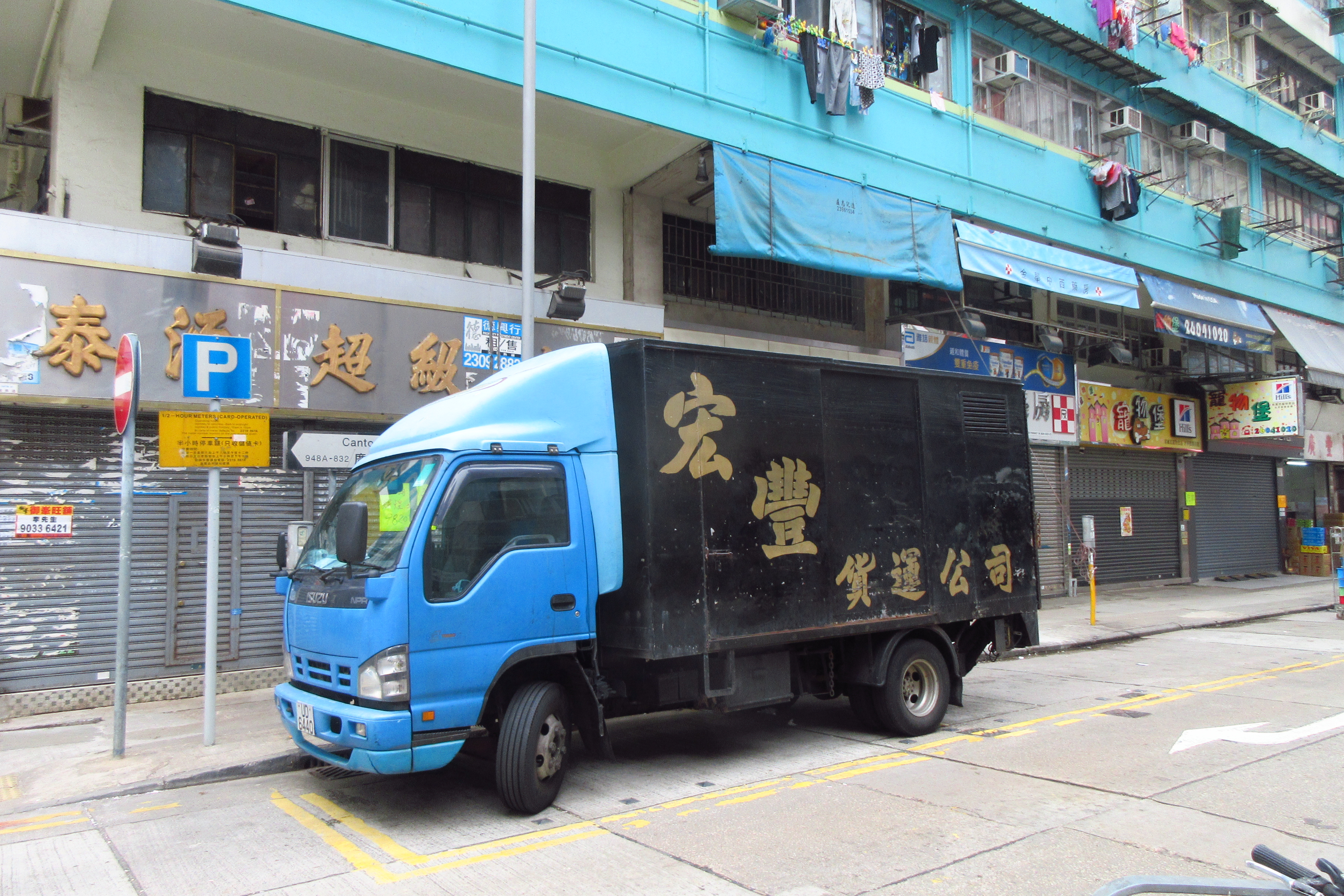
Lorry parking spaces

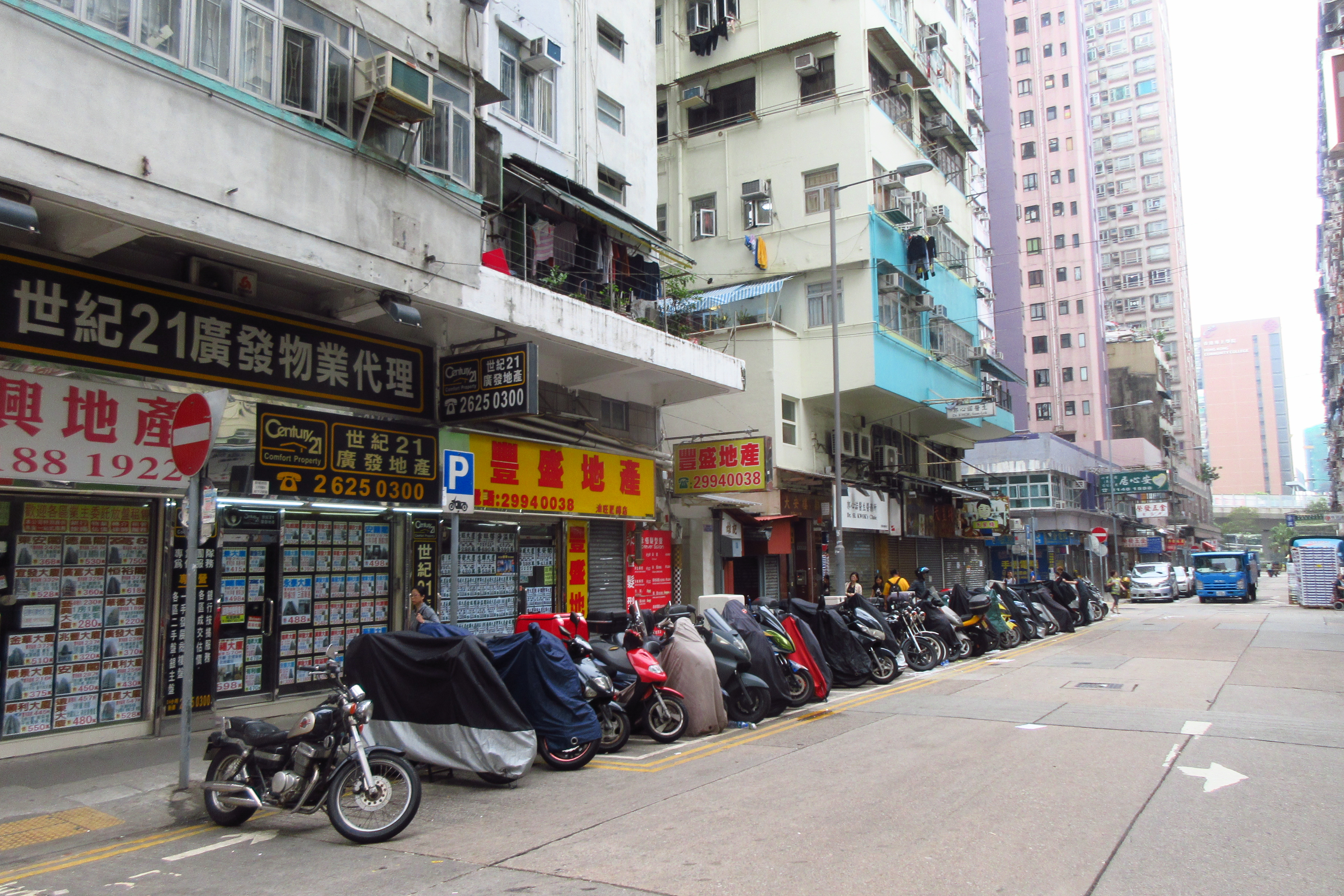
Motorcycle parking spaces

=== Railway ===
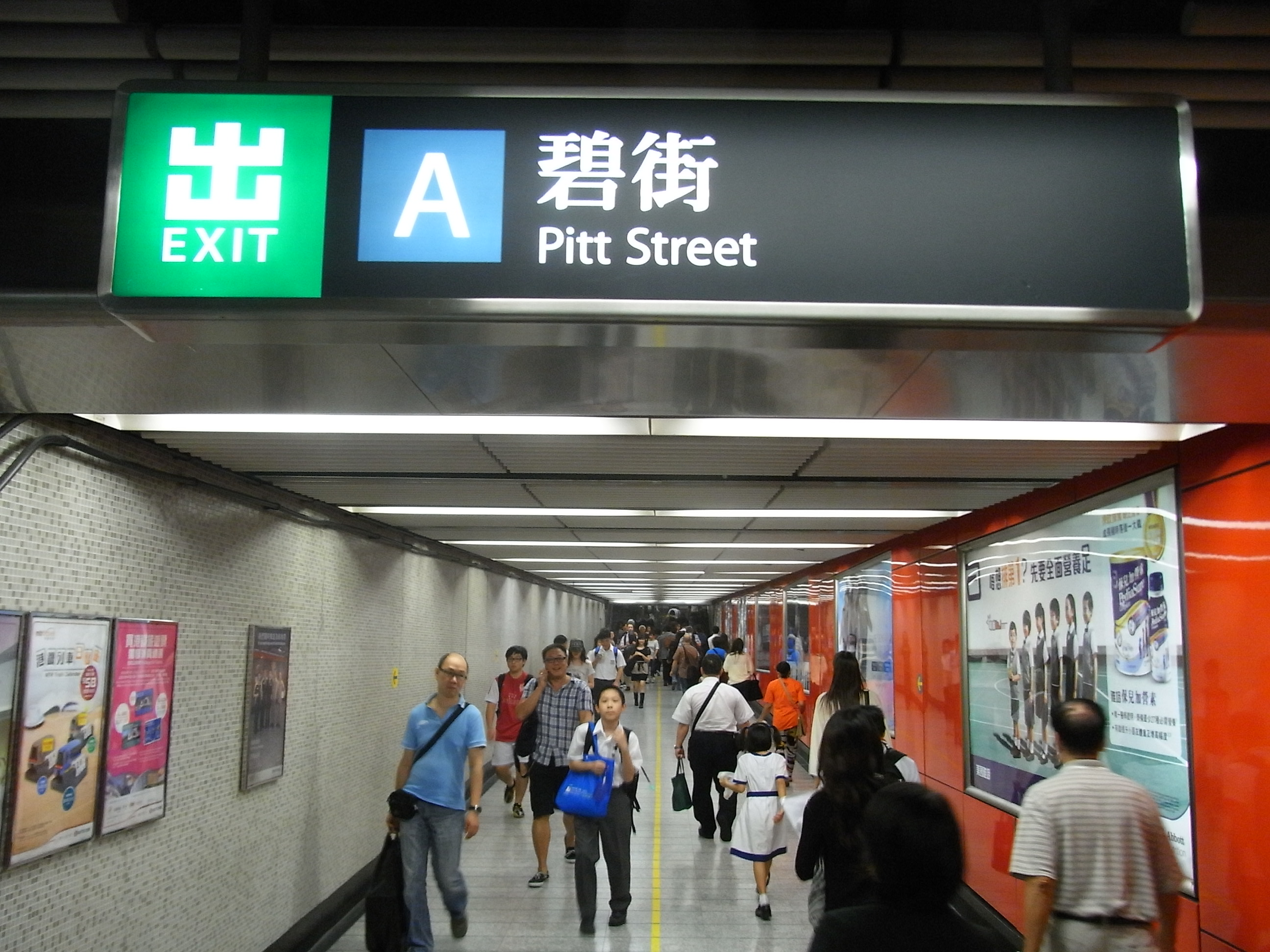
Busy tunnel of Yau Ma Tei station Exit A, with green light box indicating Pitt Street.

MTR provides services to the area around the street by Yau Ma Tei station, with two direct lines, Kwun Tong Line, from Whampoa station to Yau Tong station, and Tsuen Wan Line, from Tsuen Wan station to Central station. The station has two exits on the street. Exit A_{1} is on the section between Nathan Road and Portland Street. Exit A_{2} is one the section between Nathan Road and Tong Fong Street. Both exits were not an accessible, non-barrier free exit, providing only staircases. Although Exit A_{2} is the nearest exit to Kwong Wah Hospital, people on wheelchairs or carrying baby with pushchairs must go to the lift at Exit Lift on Waterloo Road to reach the ground, and cross several the roads. Yau Tsim Mong District Council had proposed the a subway to link Yau Ma Tei station and Kwong Wah hospital, the Highways Department considered the proposal infeasible as it required reconstruction of the ventilation duct of tunnel and station, and closure of Exit A_{2} and two lanes of Nathan Road for more than two years.

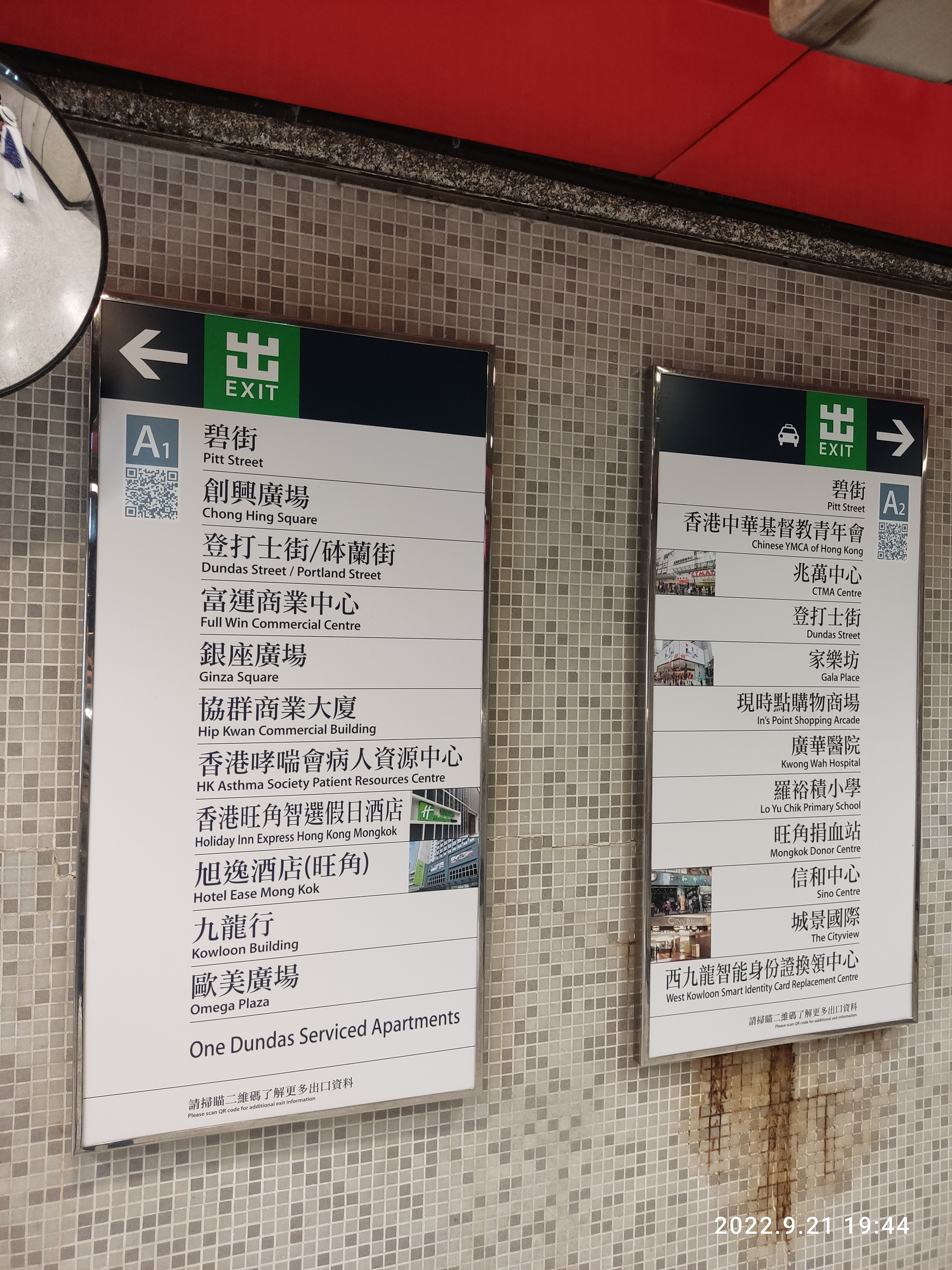
Destinations of Exit A_{1} and A_{2} were posted on a wall inside tunnel of the station

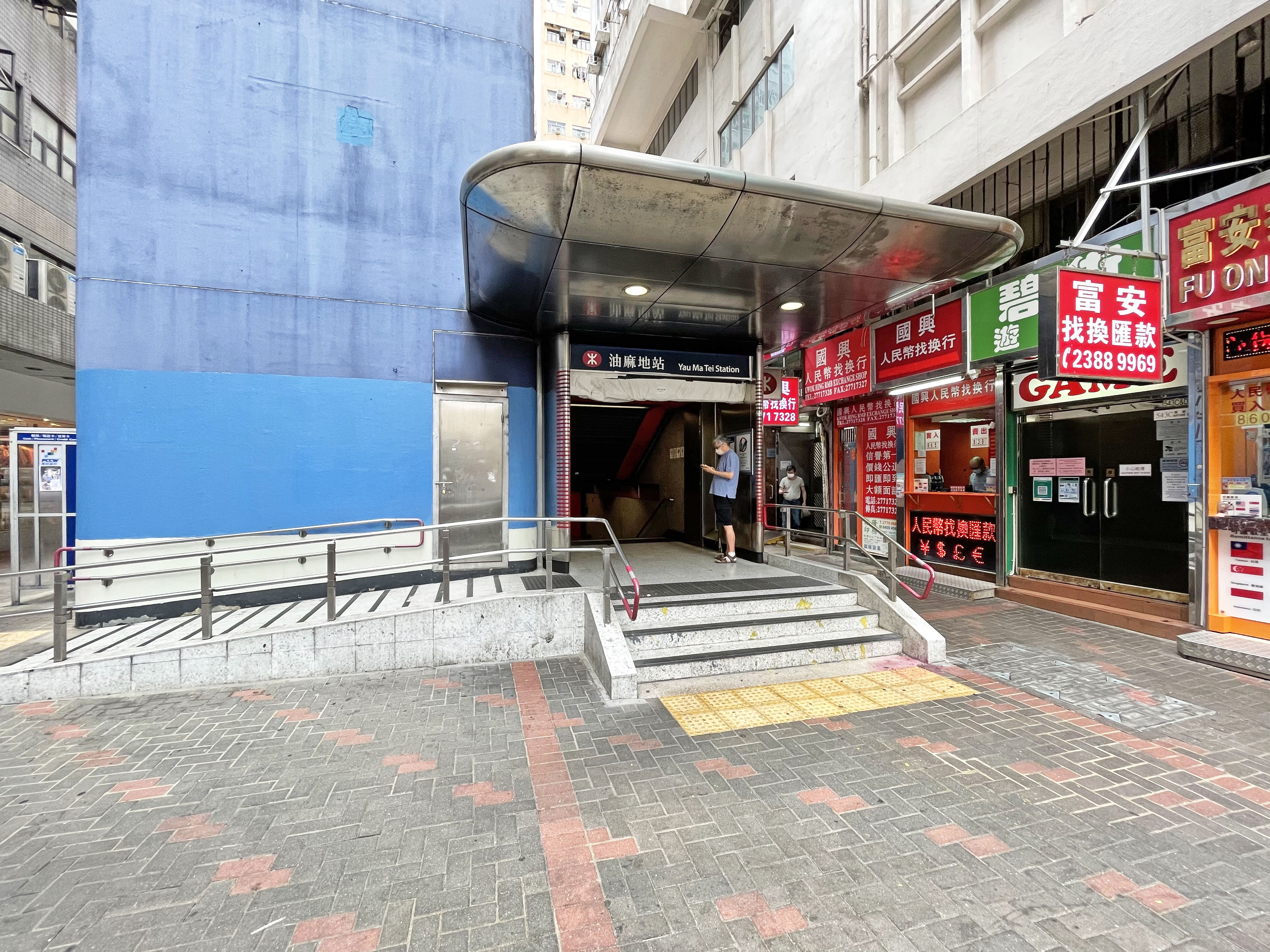
Exit A_{1} on Pitt Street, west bound

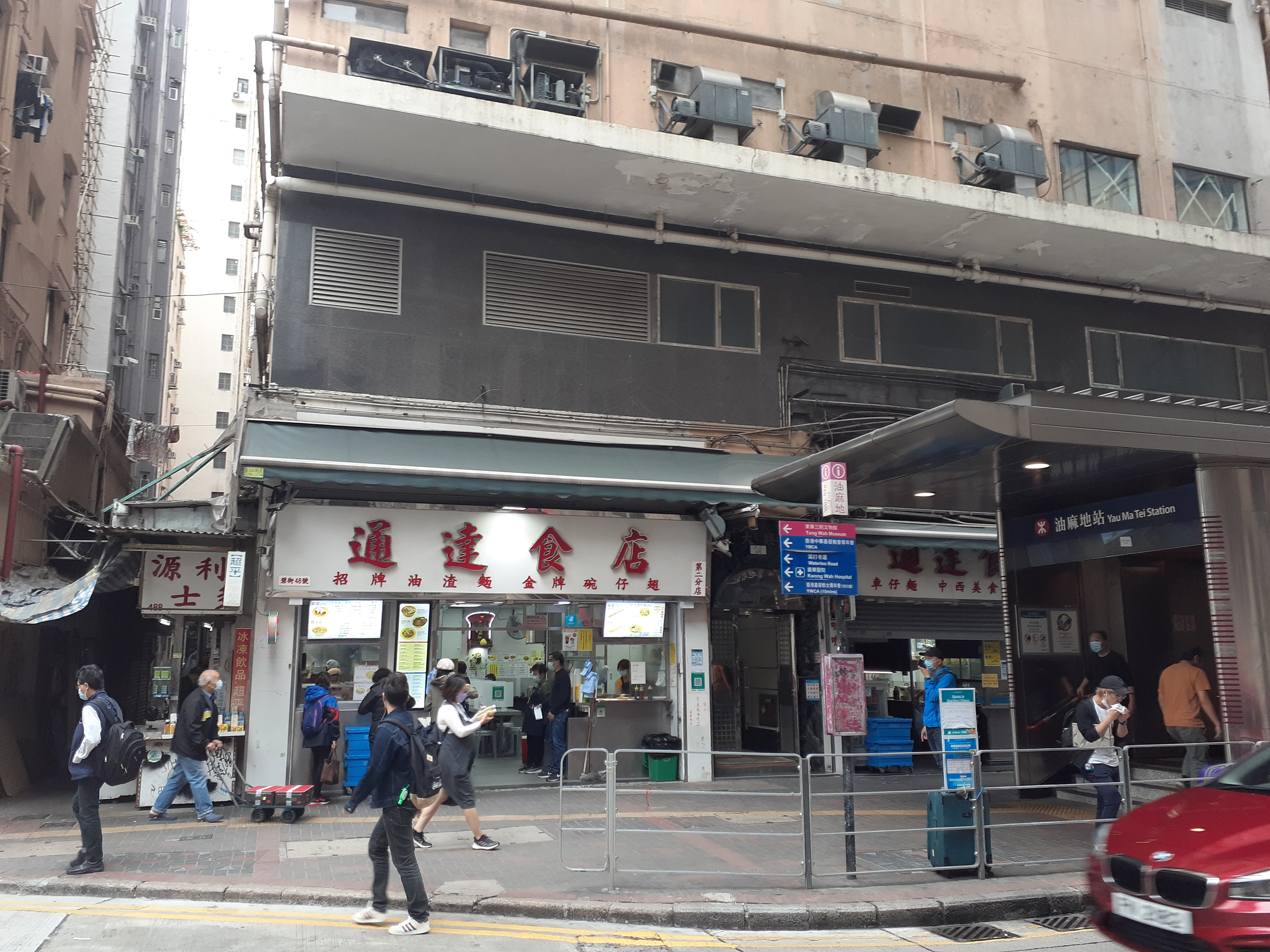
Exit A_{2} on Pitt Street, east bound

=== Bus ===
==== Franchised ====
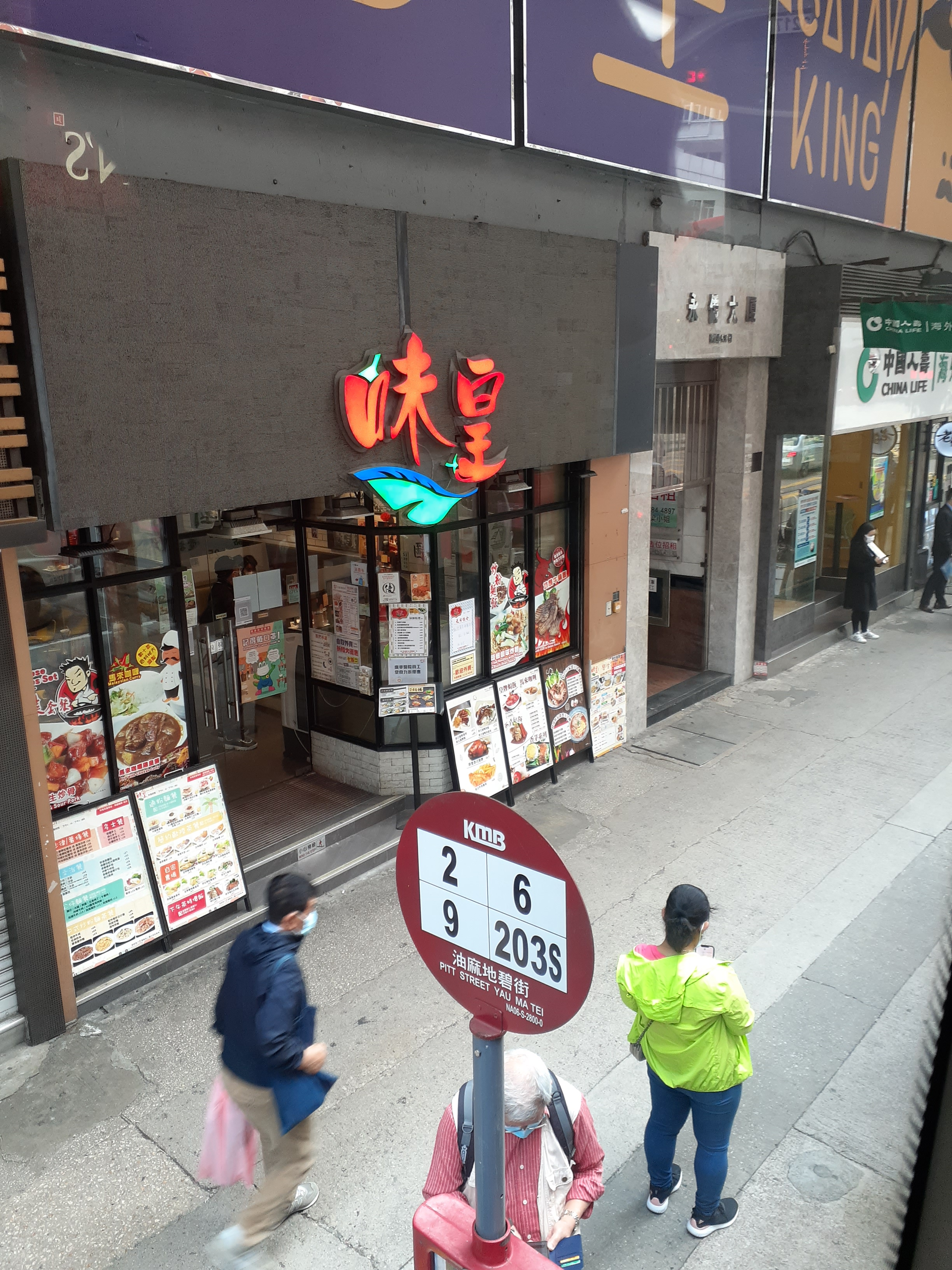
One of Pitt Street Yau Ma Tei bus stops

Franchised bus services in this area is provided by Kowloon Motor Bus and Citybus. No bus route through this street but some bus stops are close to the street, and some of them even named after the street.

On Waterloo Road, north of street junction has Kwong Wah Hospital bus stop, and south YMCA bus stop.

On Nathan Road, there are many bus stops either named Pitt Street or Pitt Street Yau Ma Tei, placed both north and south of the street, both north-bound and south bound of Nathan Road. Numerous bus routes have a stop here, serving major destinations all over Hong Kong.

On Shanghai Street, south of street junction has Pitt Street bus stop.

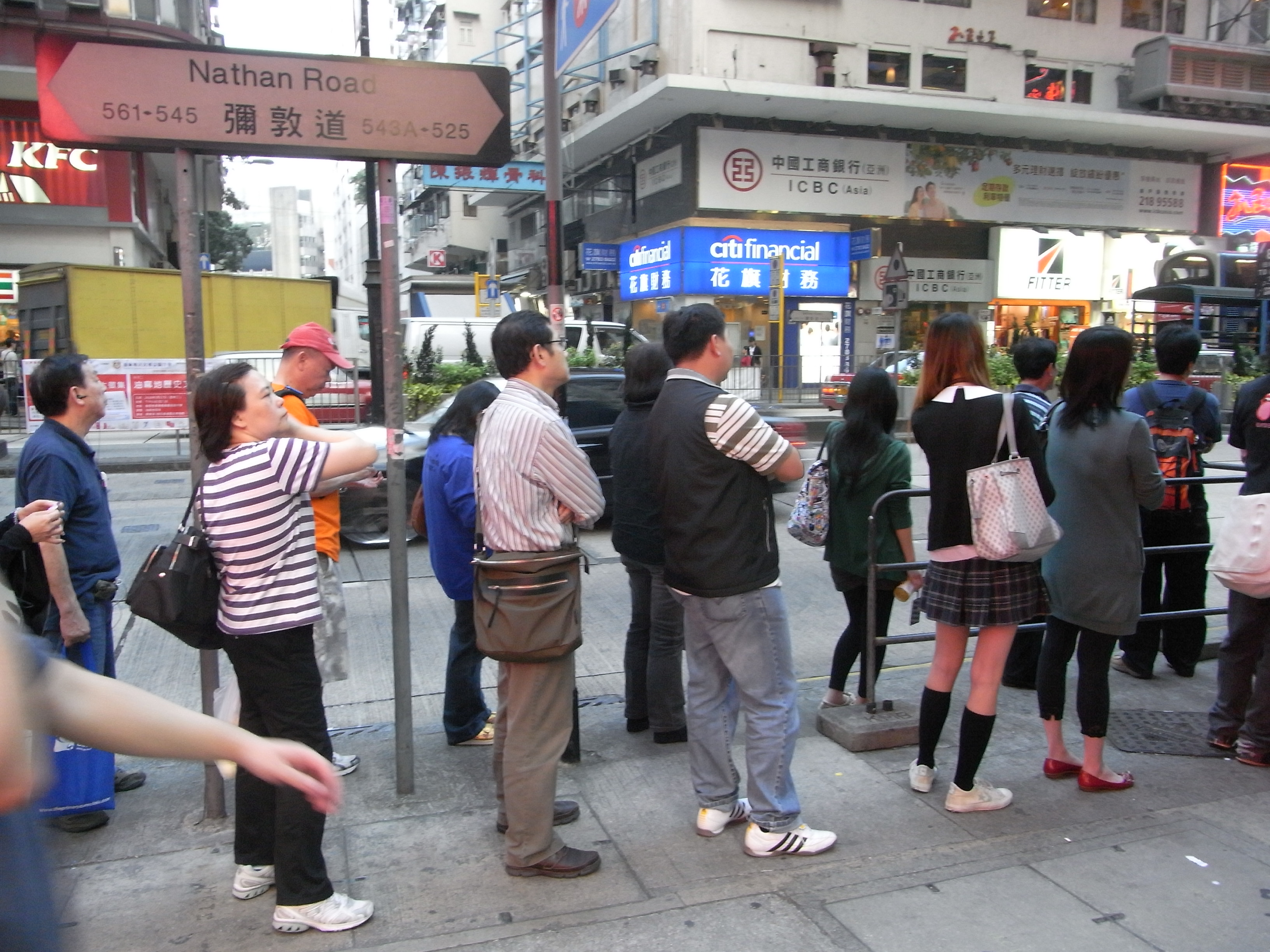
Commuters queueing at Pitt Street bus stop

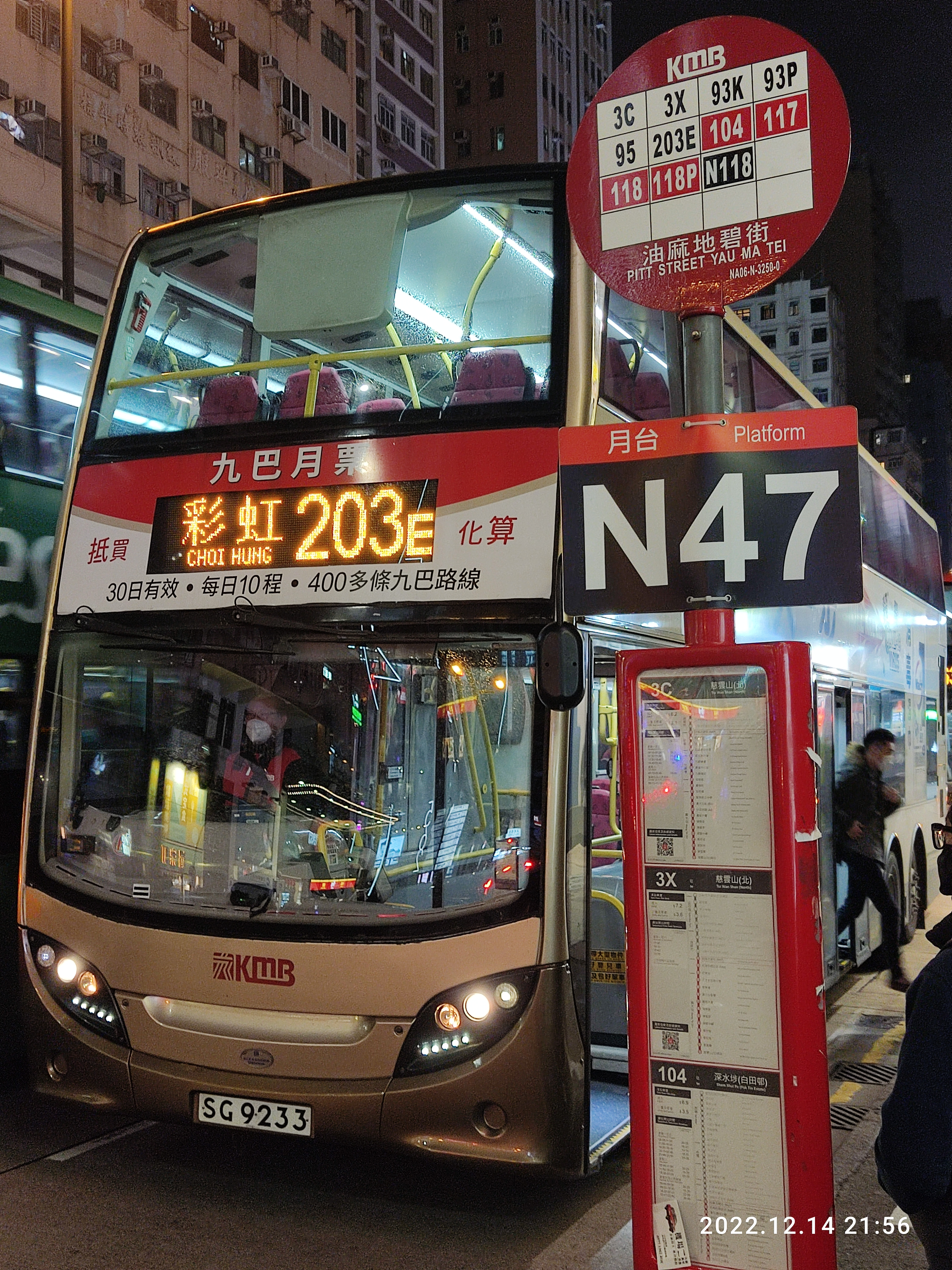
North-bound platform N47, one of Pitt Street bus stops

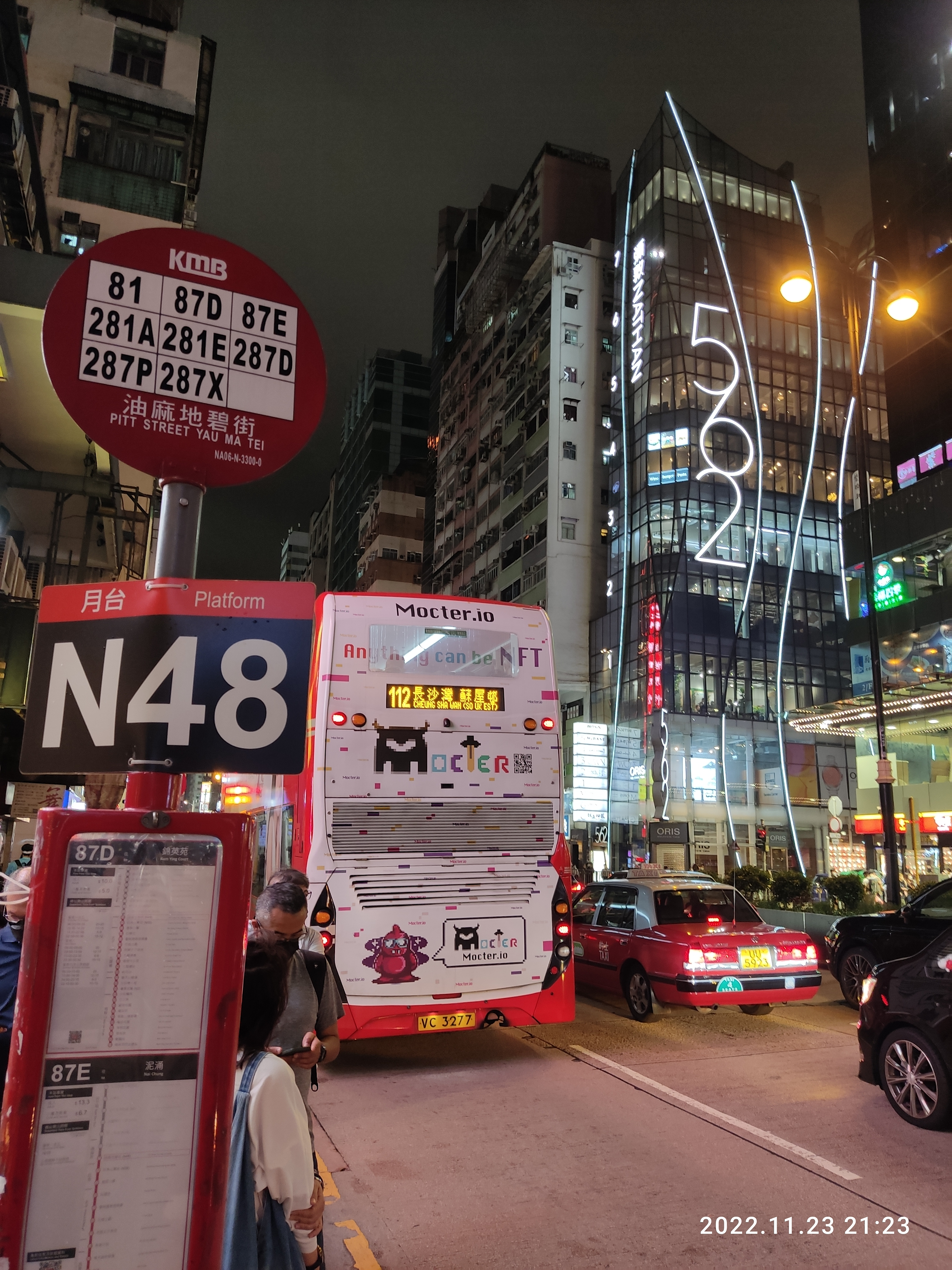
North-bound platform N48, one of Pitt Street bus stops

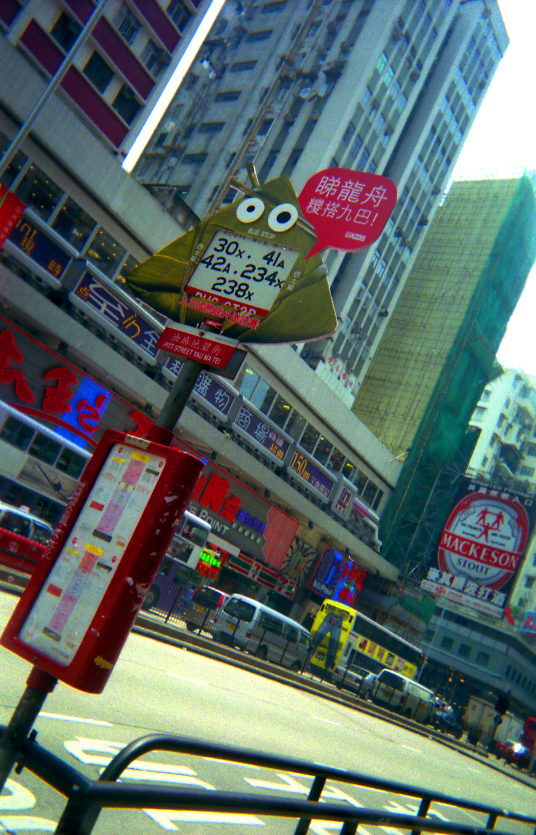
a Pitt Street bus stop, decorated during Dragon Boat Festival

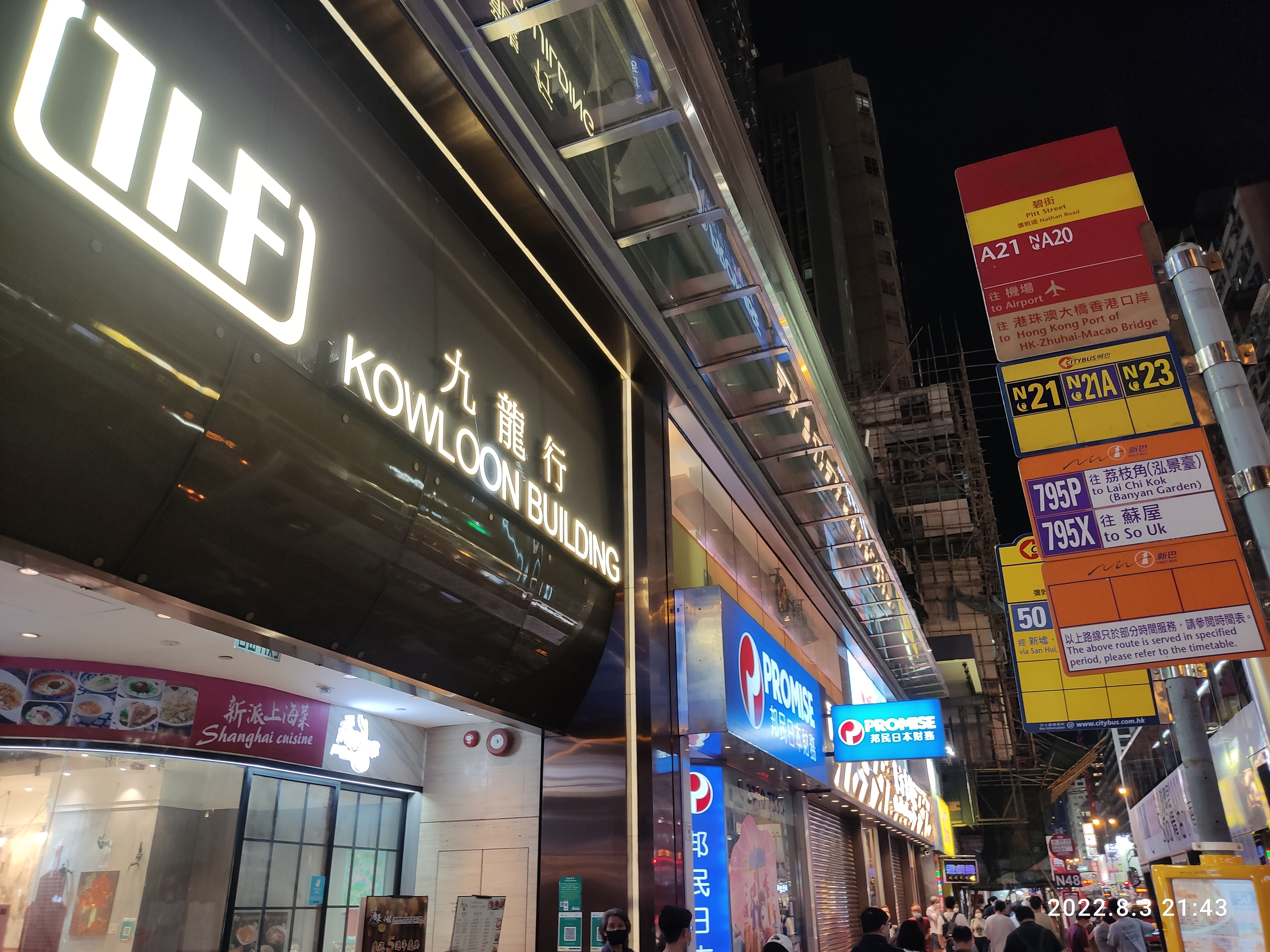
Pitt Street bus stop of Citybus and New World First Bus

==== Non-franchised ====
Transport Department permits several residential services on the street, route KR11, KR12 and KR13.

==== Cross-border ====
There is a bus stop for cross-border bus services near Pitt Street on Shanghai Street,

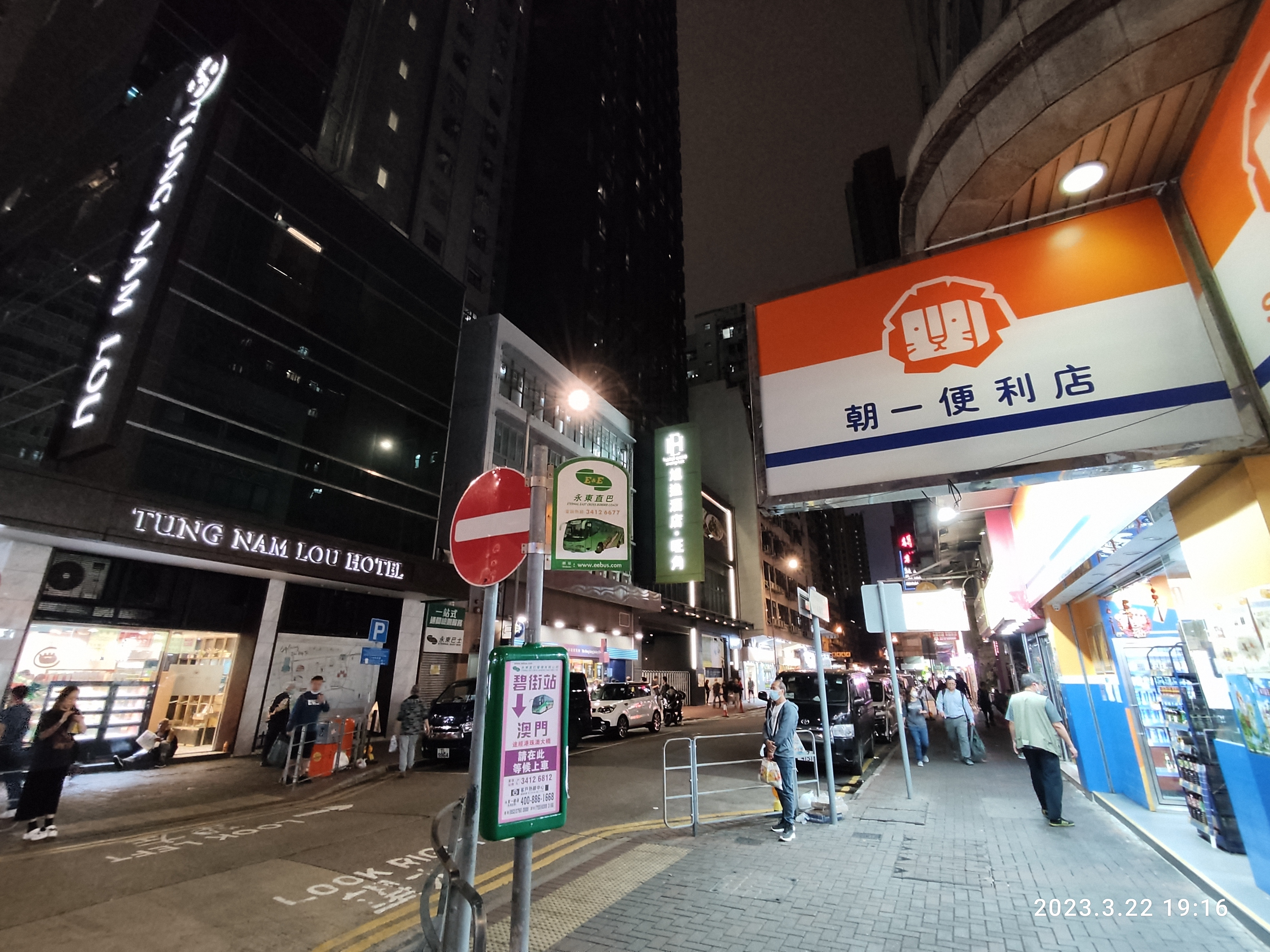
Cross-border bus stop, Pitt Street stop (label in Chinese 碧街站)

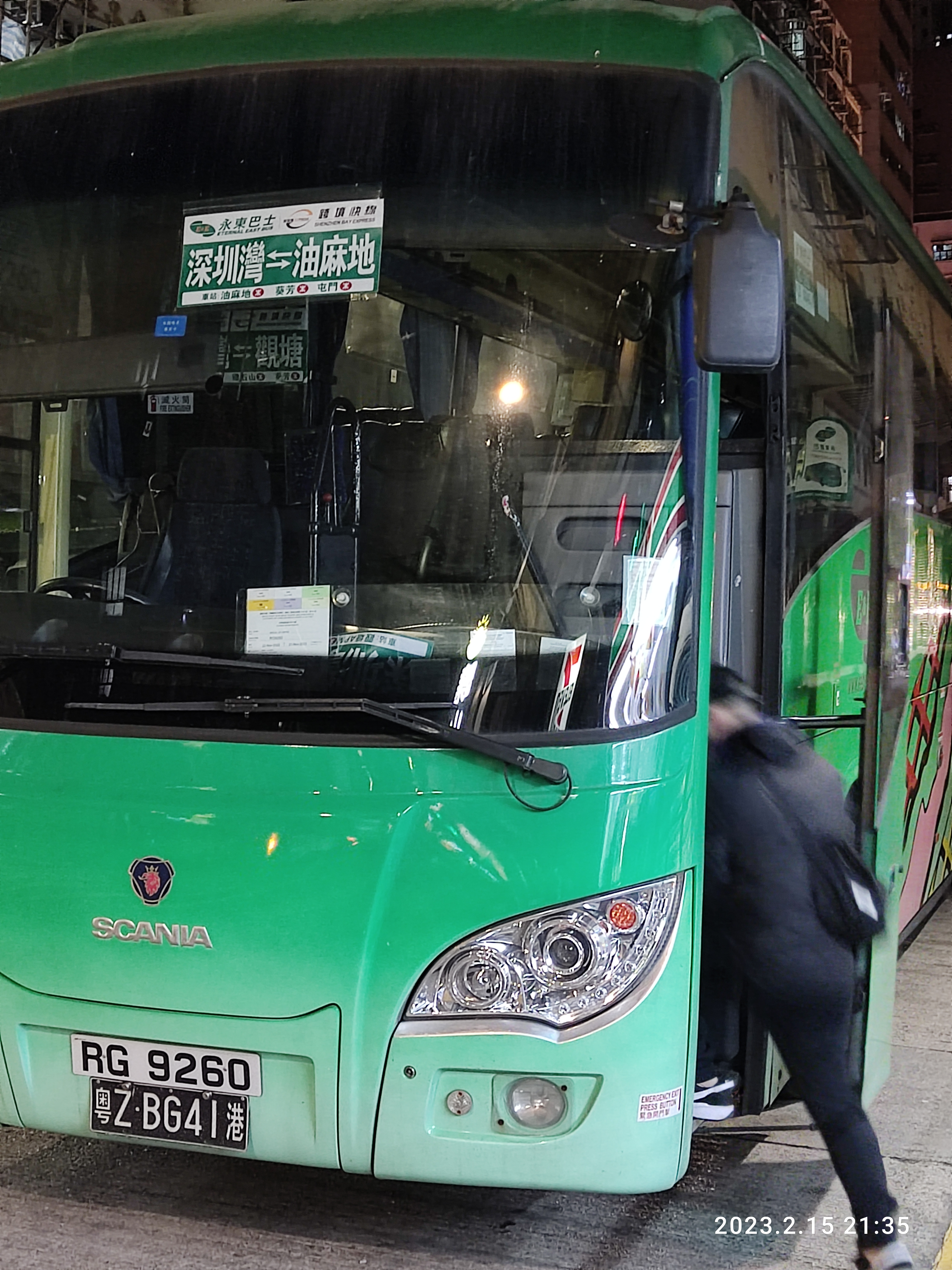
Cross-border bus

== Business ==
=== Hotel ===
There are two hotels on the street, The Cityview, and Tung Nam Lou Art Hotel.

The Cityview on the premises of Chinese YMCA of Hong Kong, formerly YMCA International House. After renovation in 2008, the hostel transformed to a 4-star hotel and rebranded as The Cityview.

Tung Nam Lou Art Hotel, situated at the junction of Pitt Street and Portland Street, was established in 2019, featuring with art and culture.

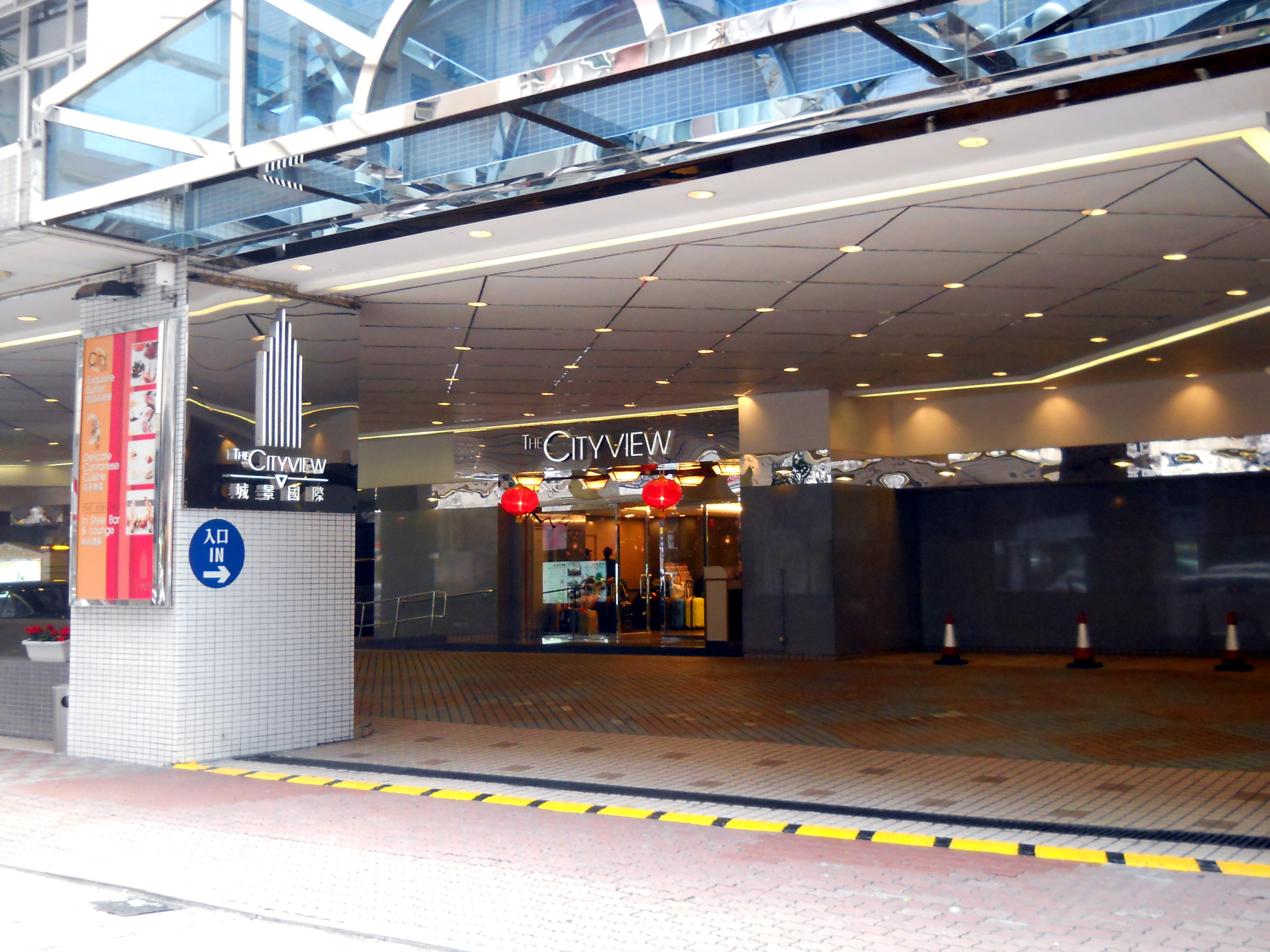
The CityView

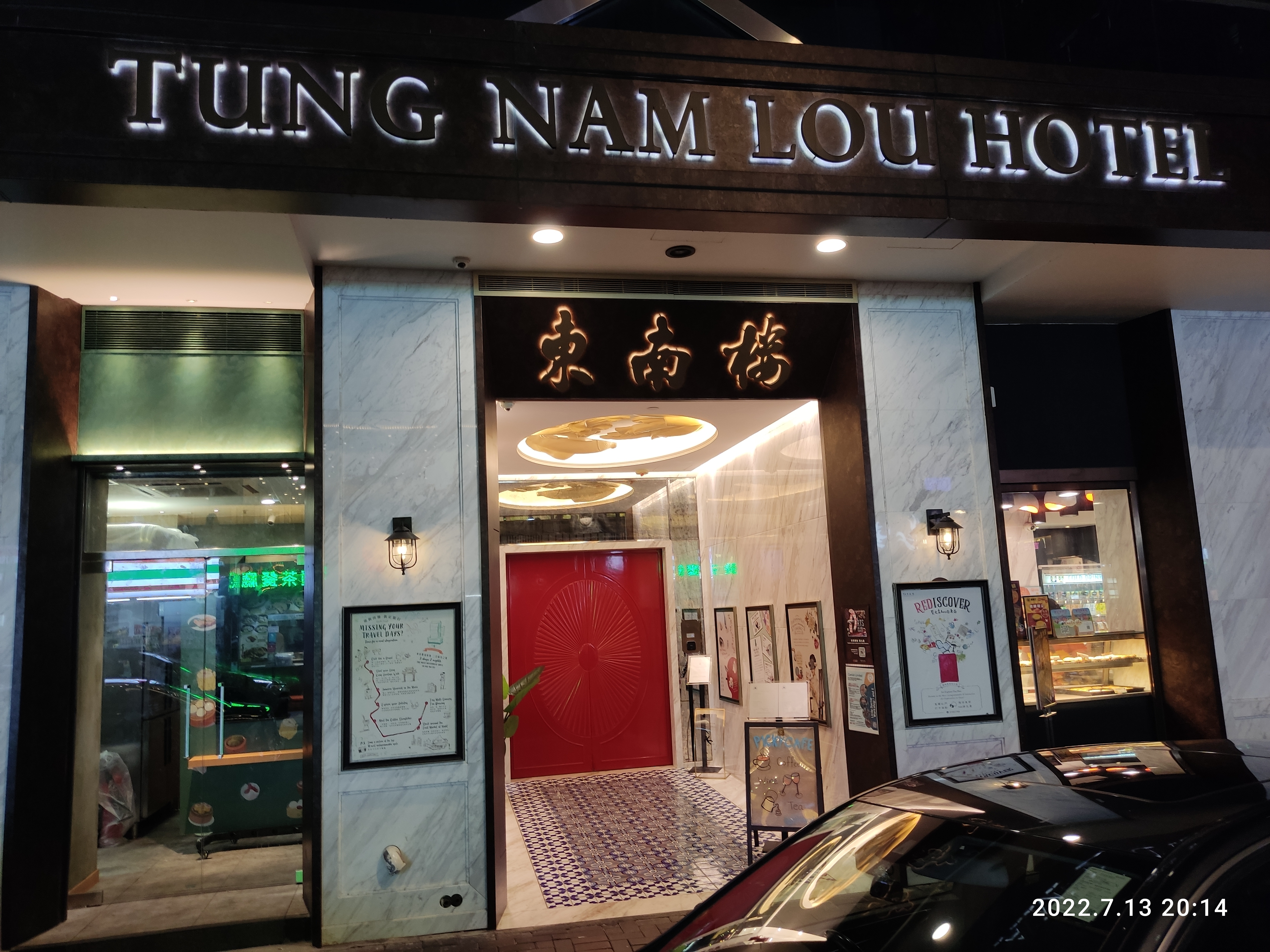
Tung Nam Lou Art Hotel

=== Cuisine ===
There are wide range of cuisine on the street, mostly indigenous food of Hong Kong, such as Cha chaan teng, Chinese restaurant, dim sum shop, fish ball shop, herbal tea shop, deep fried food shop, Cantonese cake shop and noodle shop.

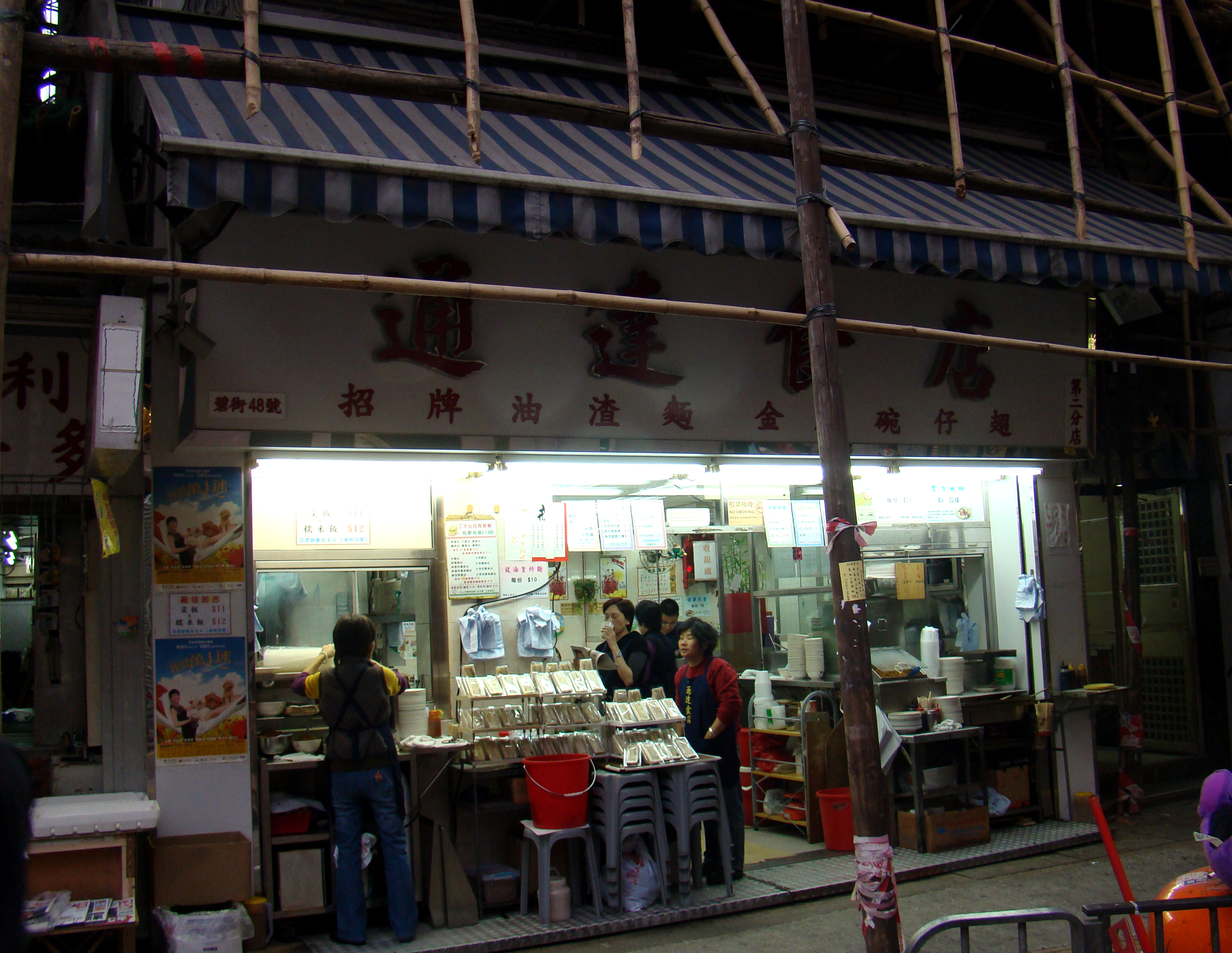
Noodle shop in the morning

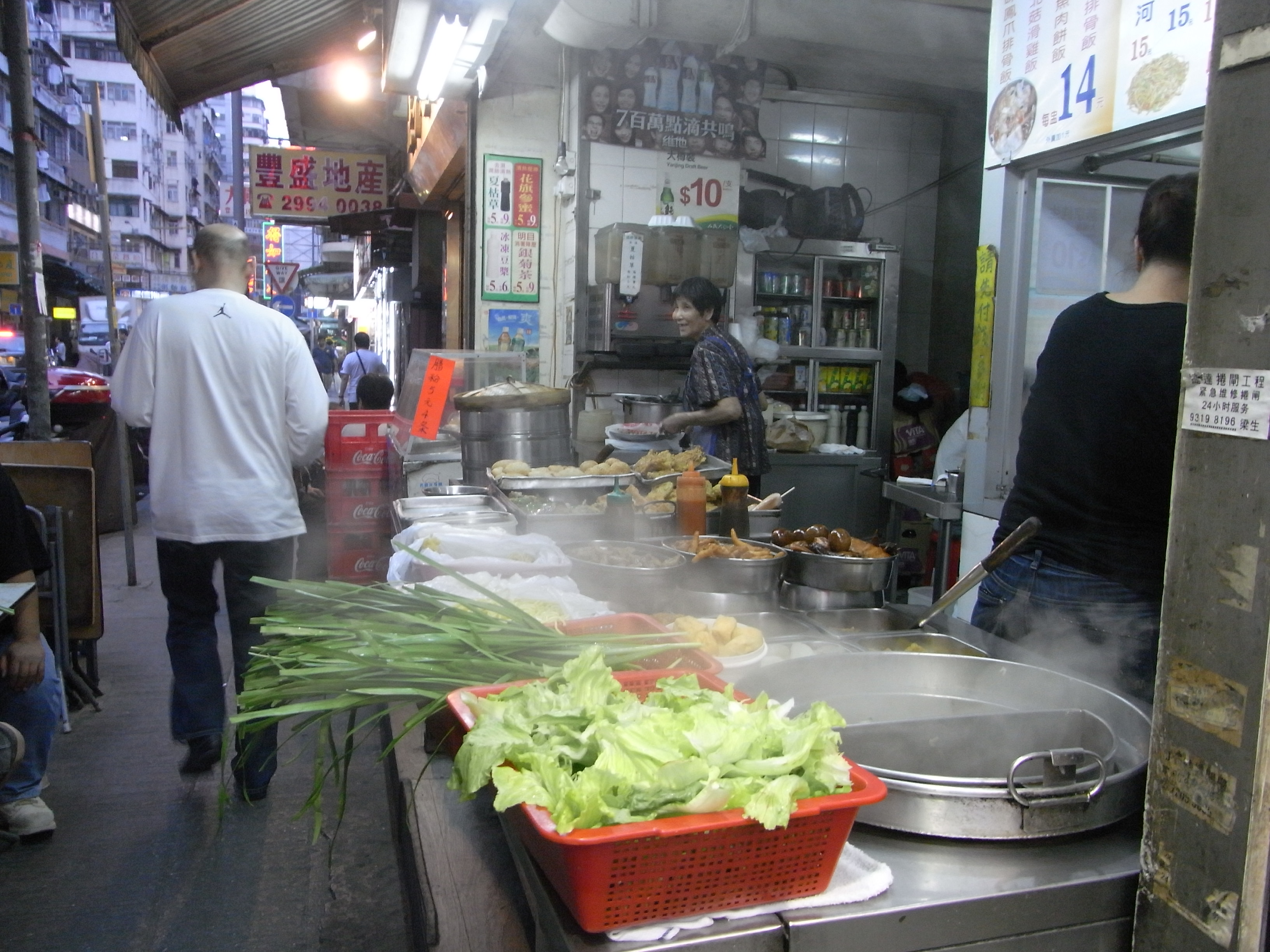
Small restaurant. Dai Pai Dong style.

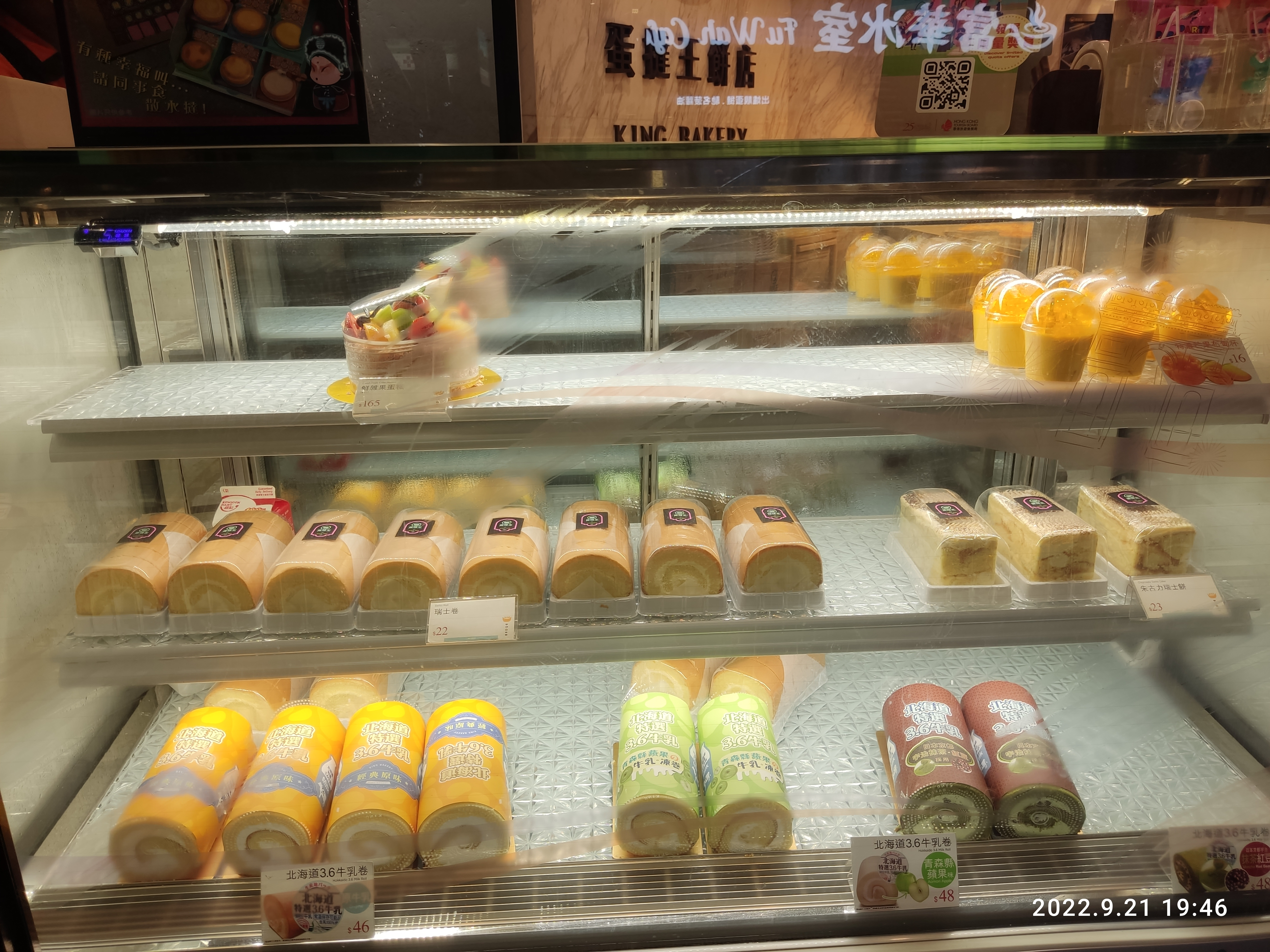
Bakery

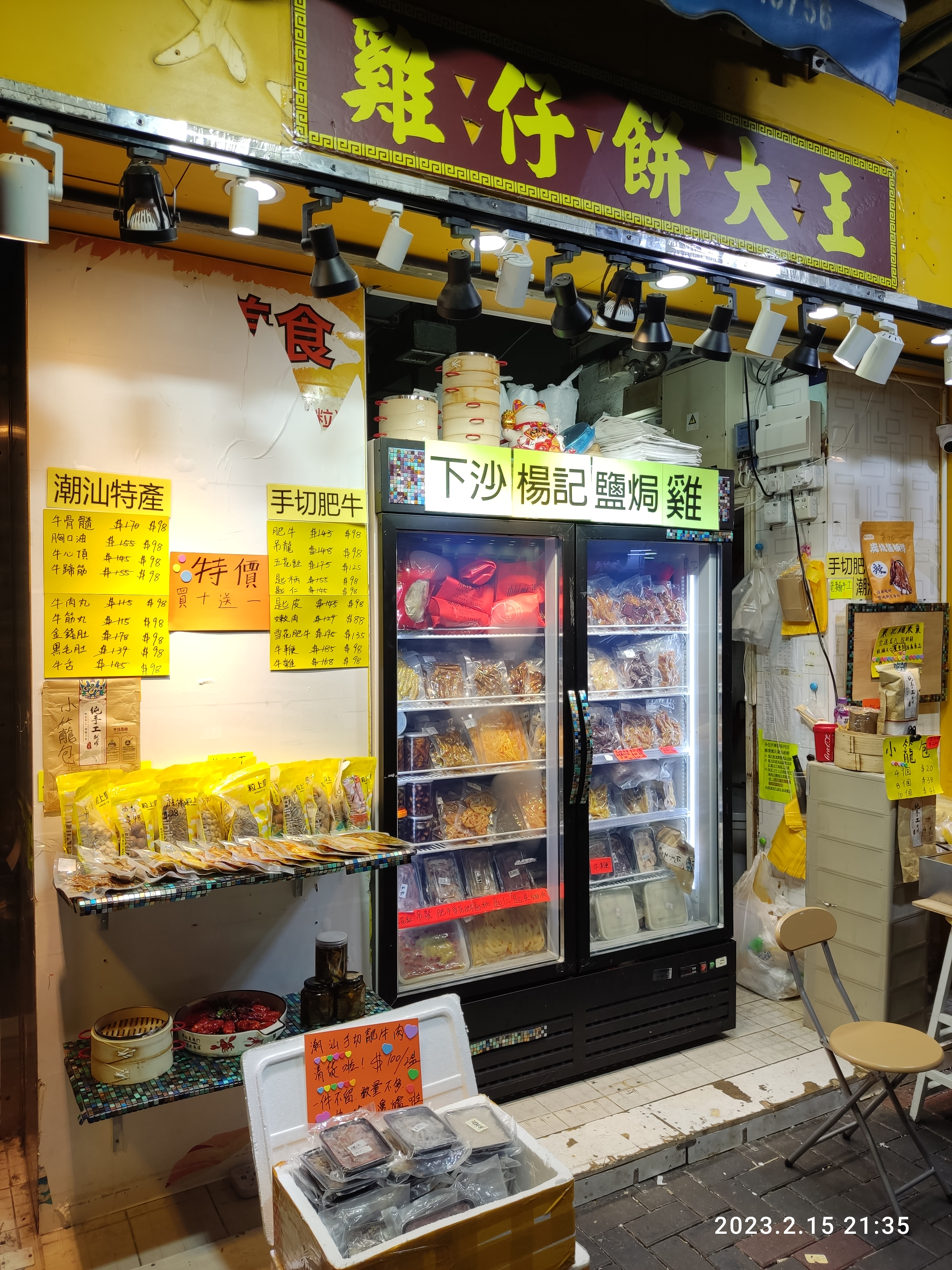
Hong Kong style cake shop

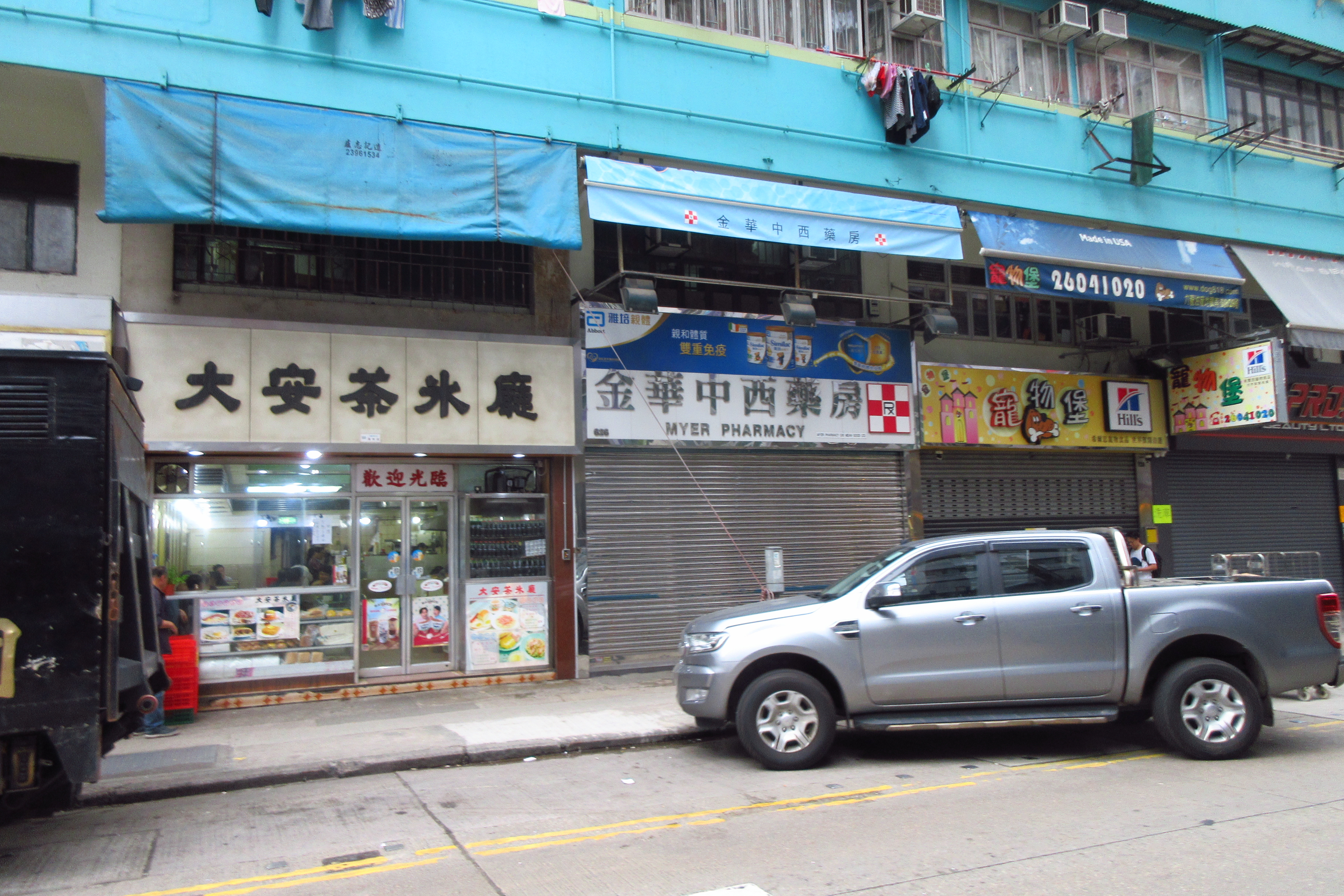
Cha chaan teng

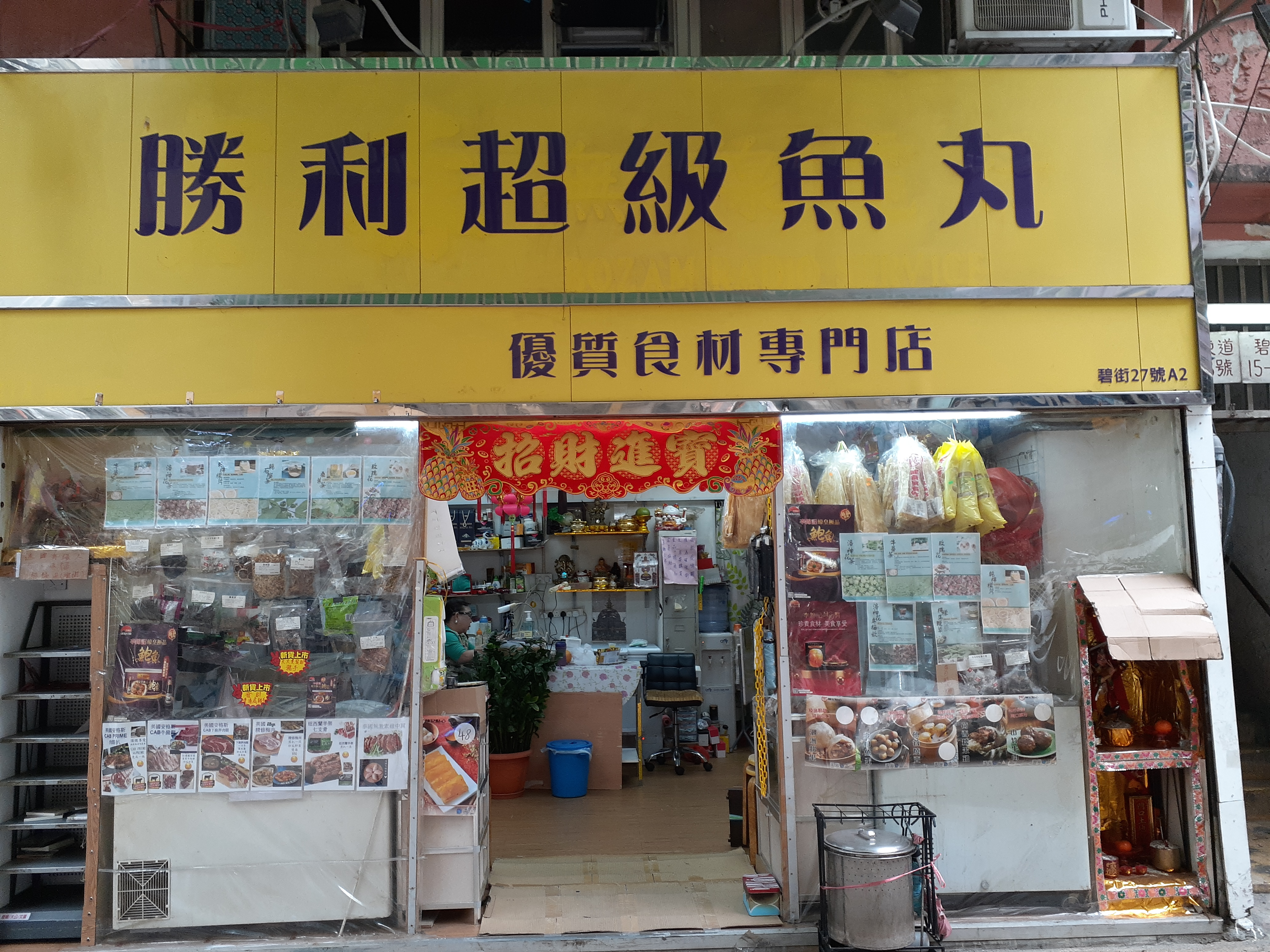
Fish ball

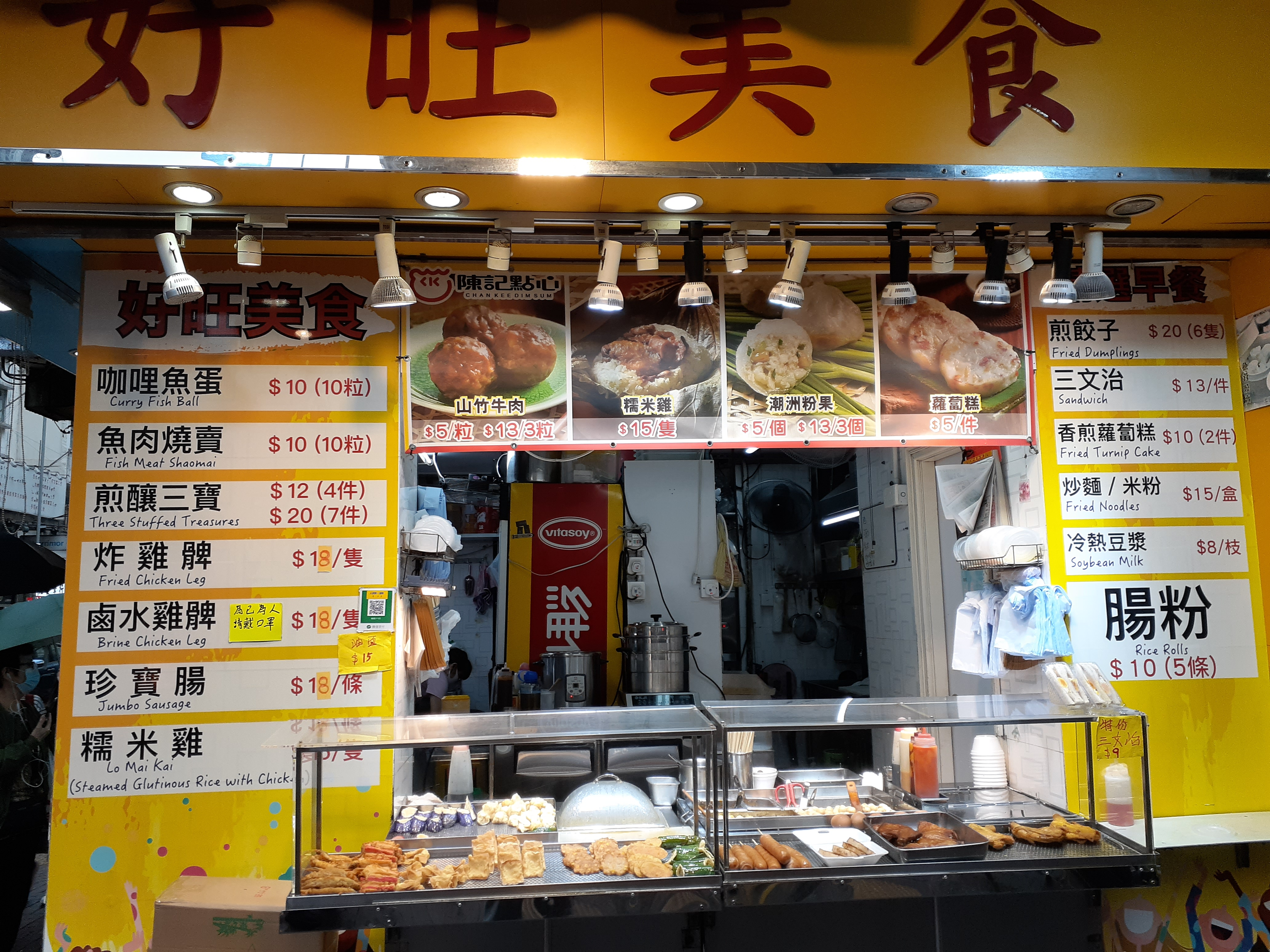
Deep fried foods

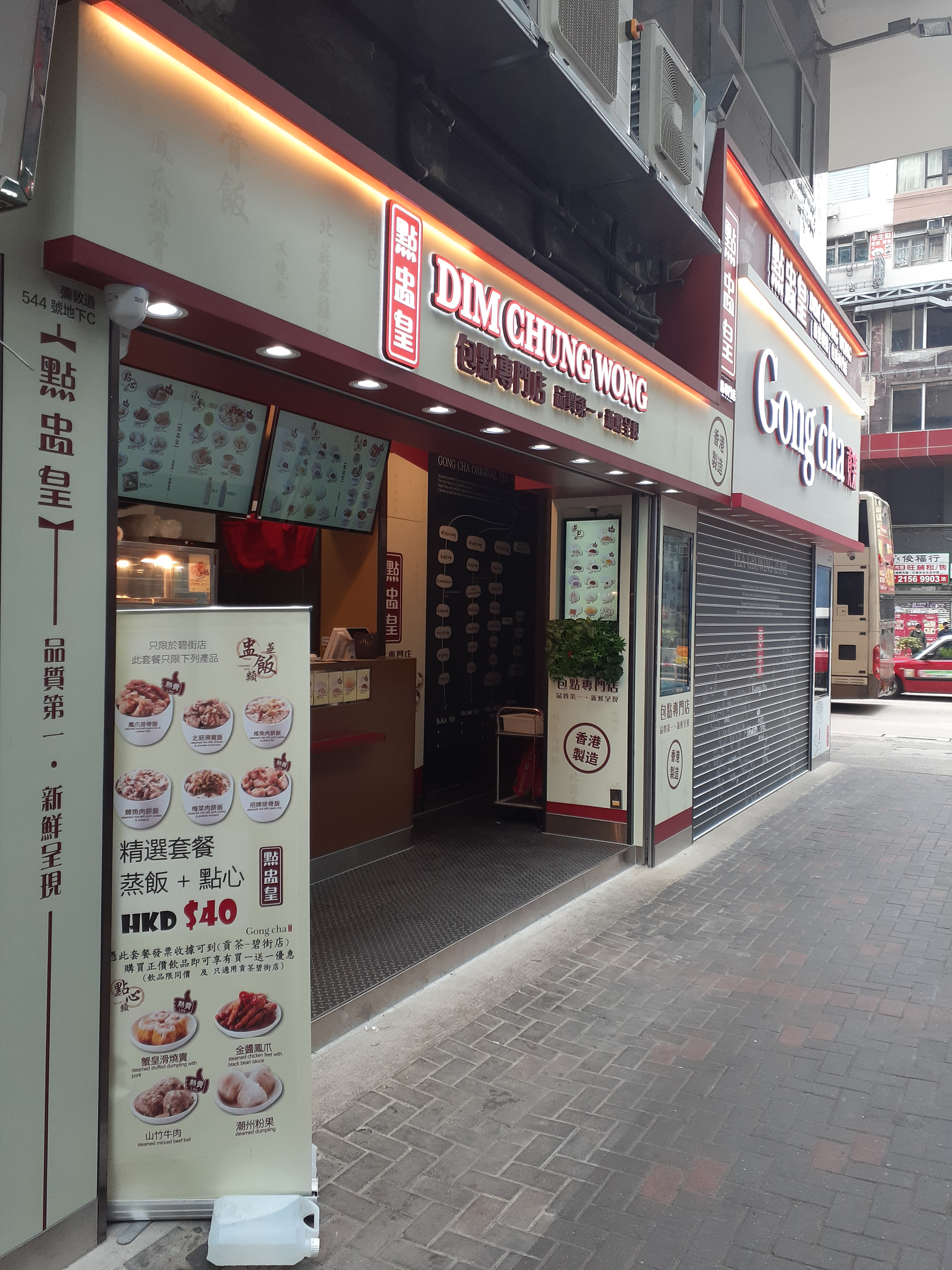
Dim sum shop

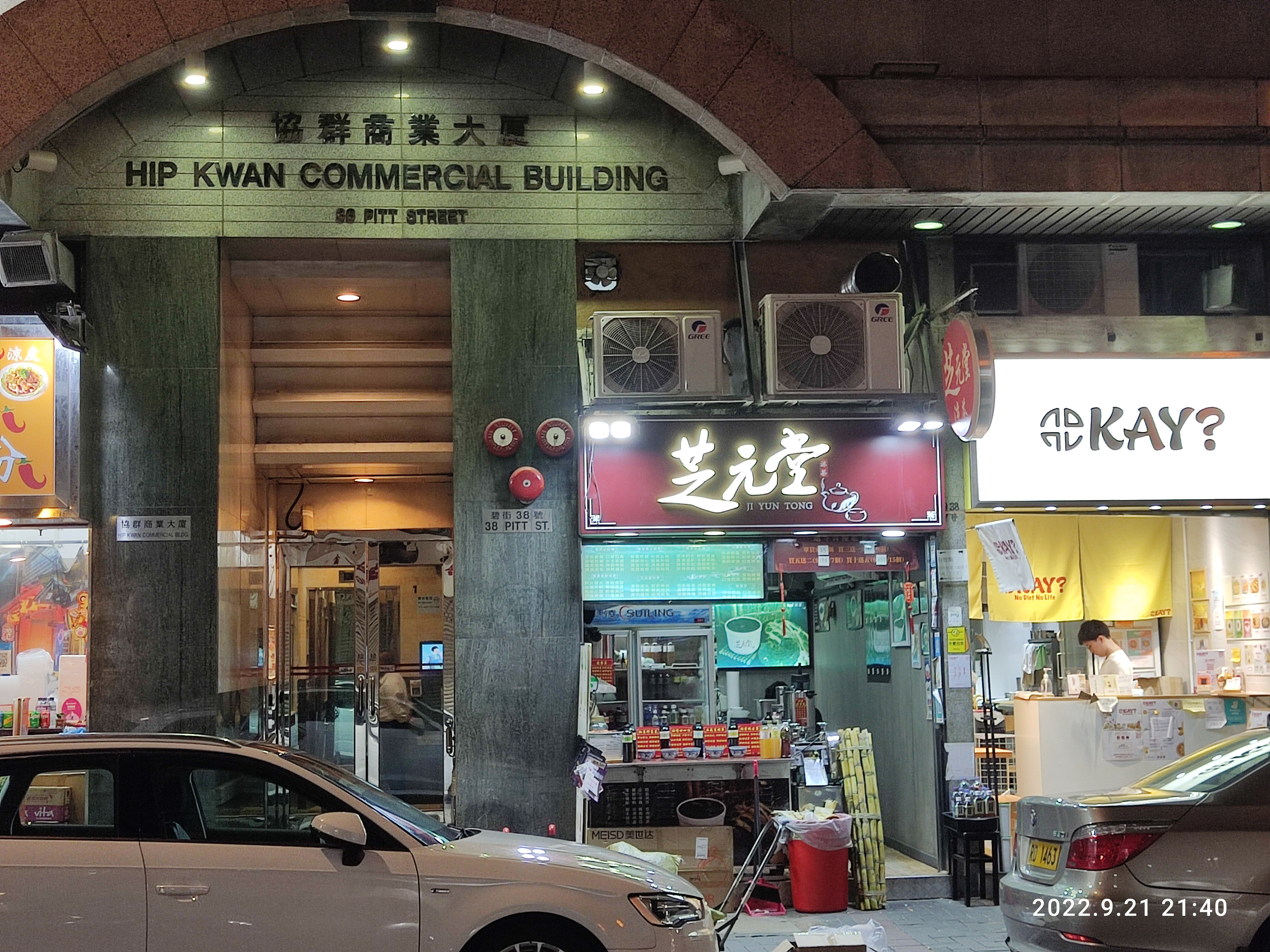
Herbal tea shop

== Education ==
=== YMCA College of Careers ===
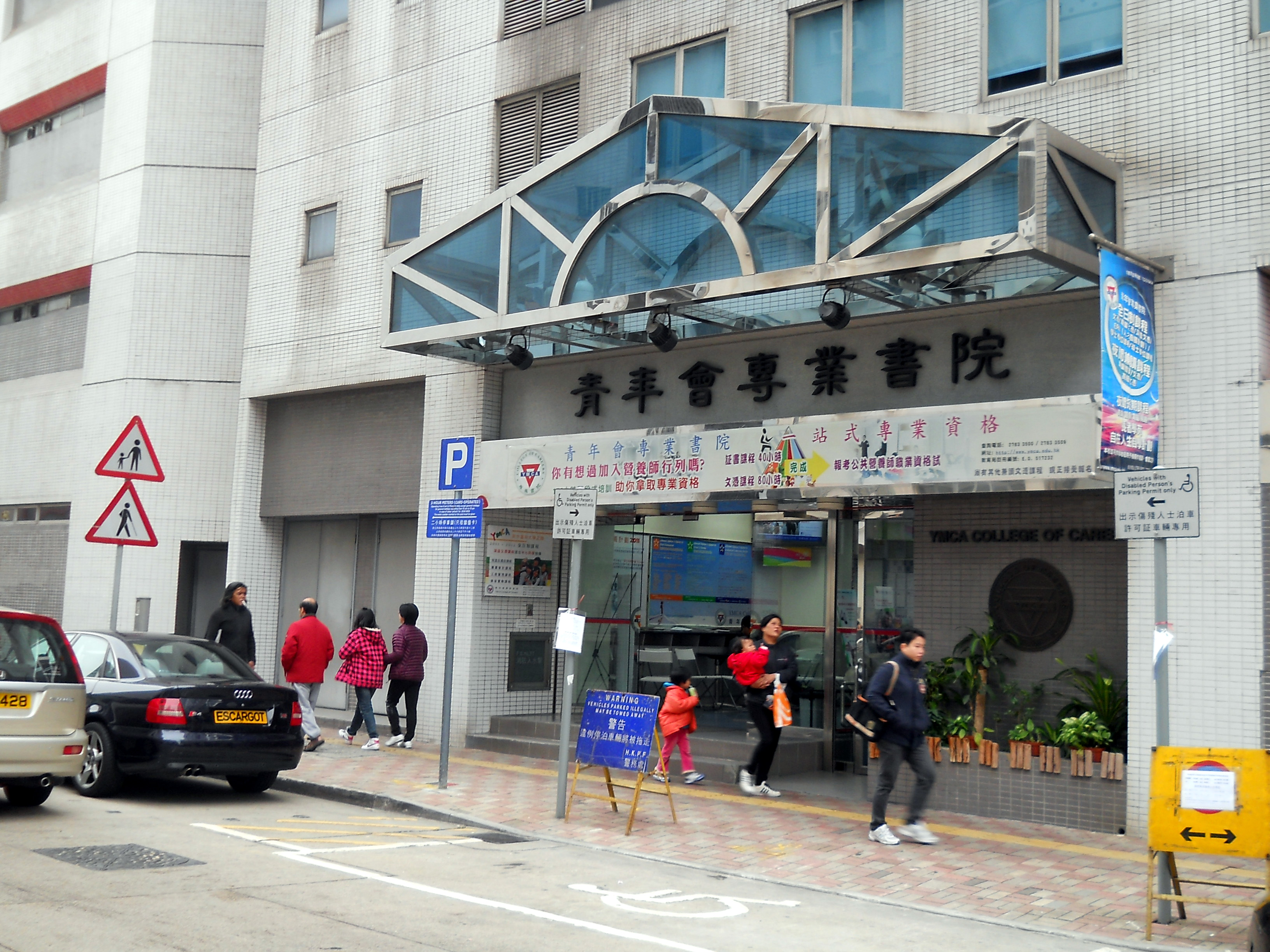
YMCA College Of Careers

YMCA College of Careers, located on the section between Waterloo Road and Tung Fong Street, is an education institute set up by Chinese YMCA and is in the headquarters of Chinese YMCA. Originally it was a continuous education centre. In 1995, the centre became a registered school and renamed YMCA College of Careers. It provides various programmes of certificates and higher certificates on different subjects.

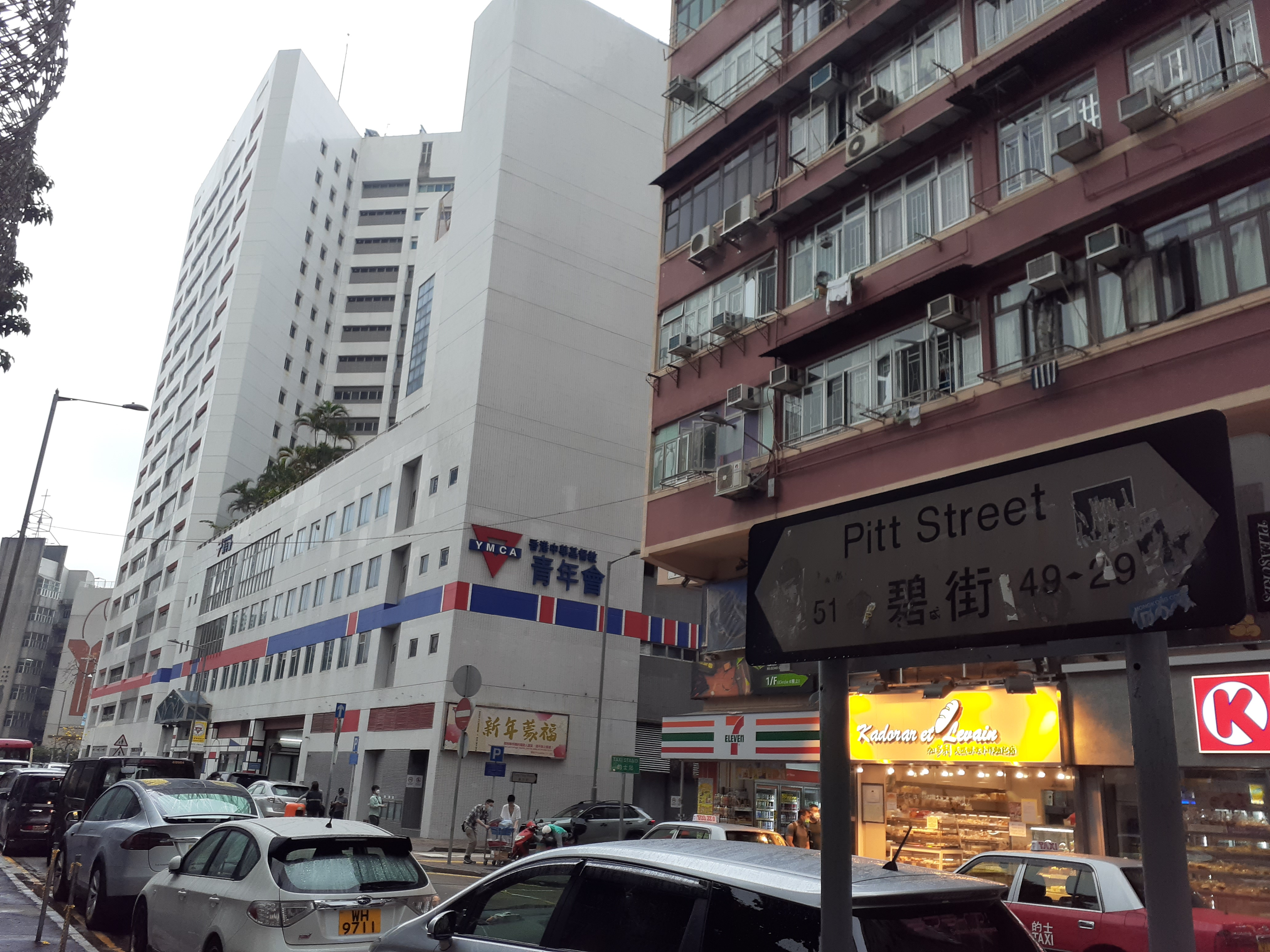
Another view on Pitt Street

=== Tung Wah Group of Hospitals Lo Yu Chik Primary School ===
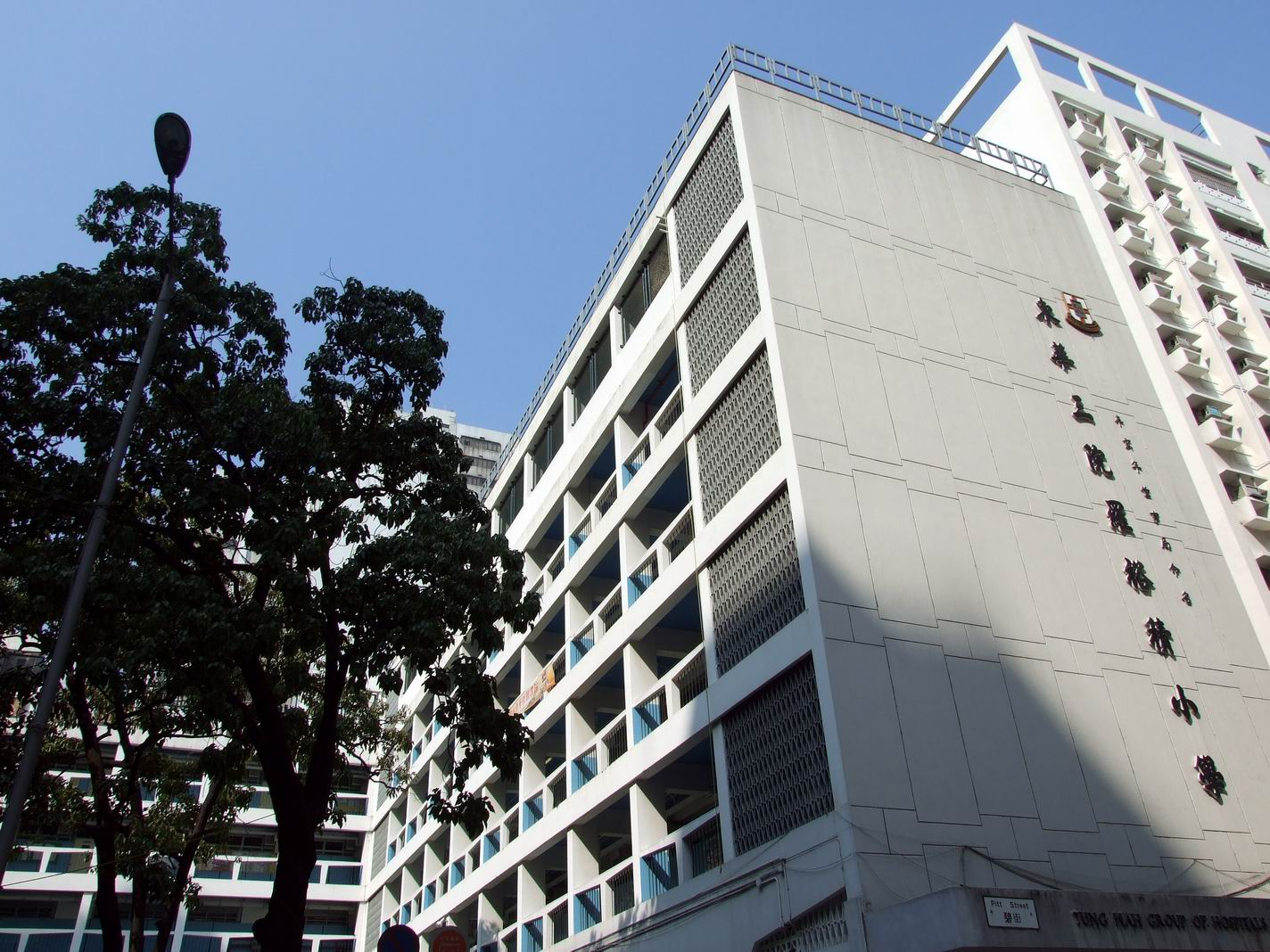
TWGHs Lo Yu Chik Primary School

Tung Wah Group of Hospitals Lo Yu Chik Primary School, on the section between Kwong Wah Hospital and Yau Mong Lane on the west, is a primary school adjacent to Kwong Wah Hospital. The school, organised by Tung Wah Group of Hospitals, was built on the land formerly part of the hospital when the hospital was reconstructed in 1958.

The school building is a multi-storey building, occupying east, north and west side, with open area facing Pitt Street.

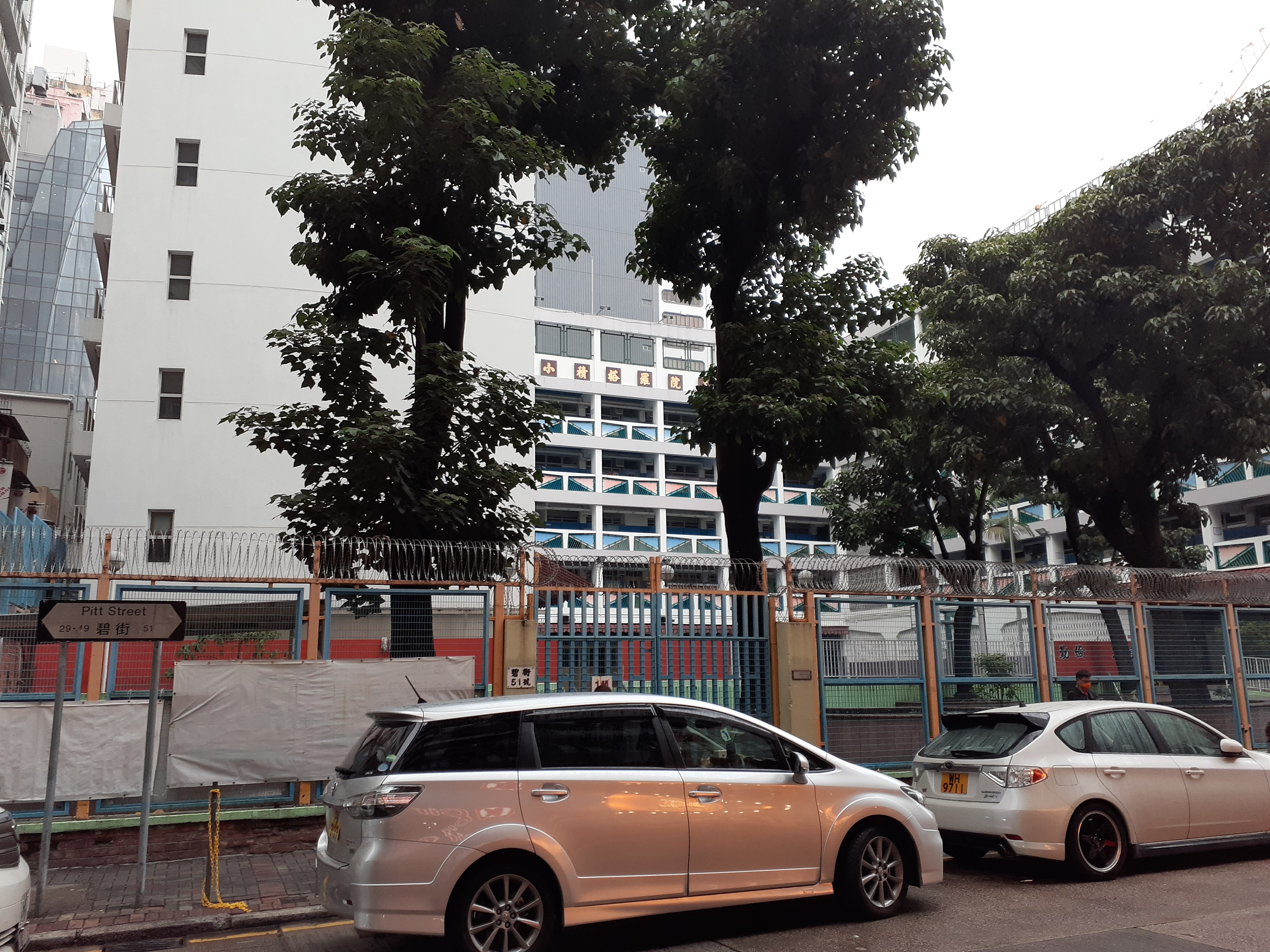
View from Pitt Street, with three linked blocks of multi-storey buildings

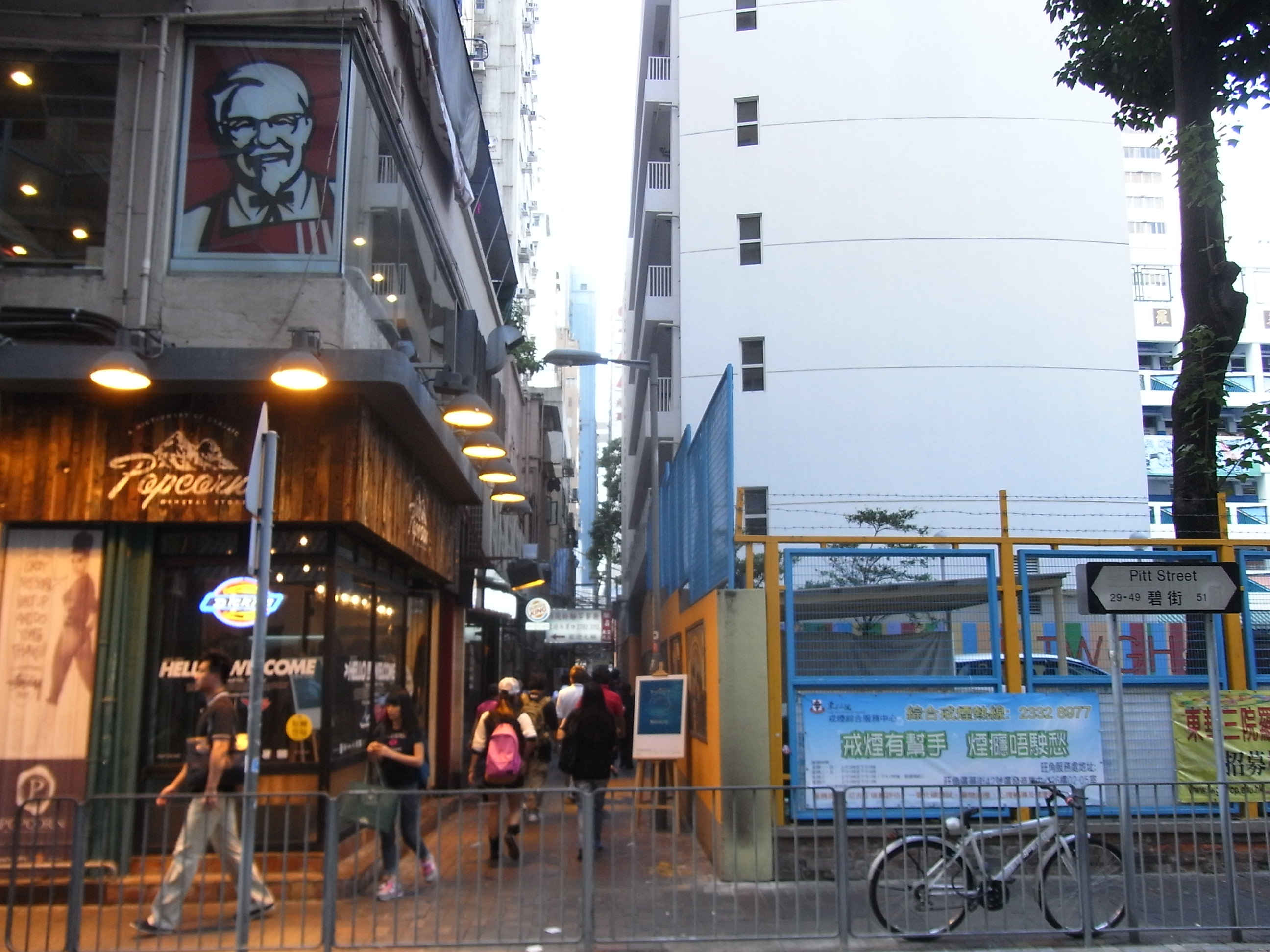
Its back lane on the west is very crowd.

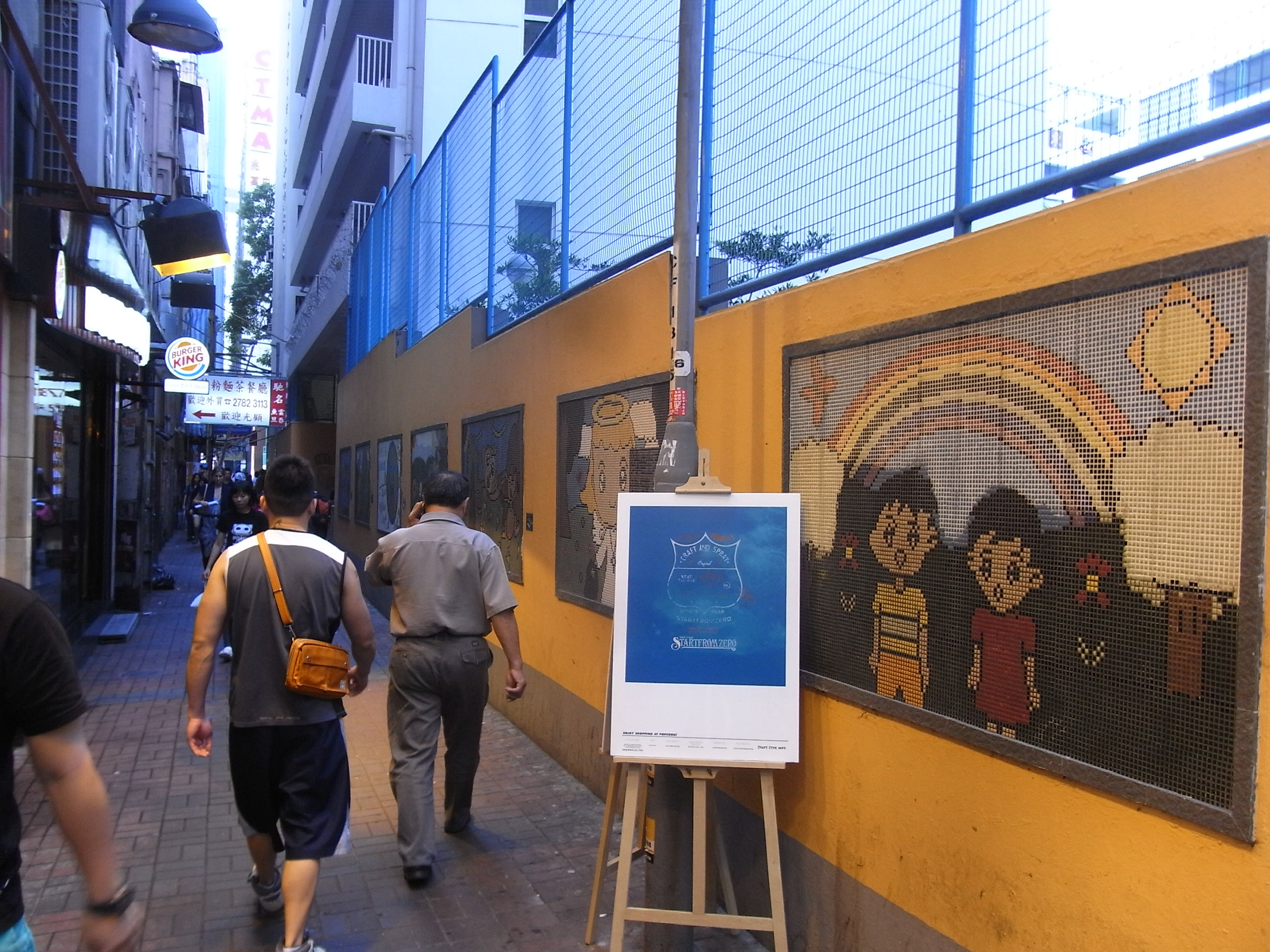
Back lane with school mural

== Vicinity ==
=== Tung Wah Museum ===
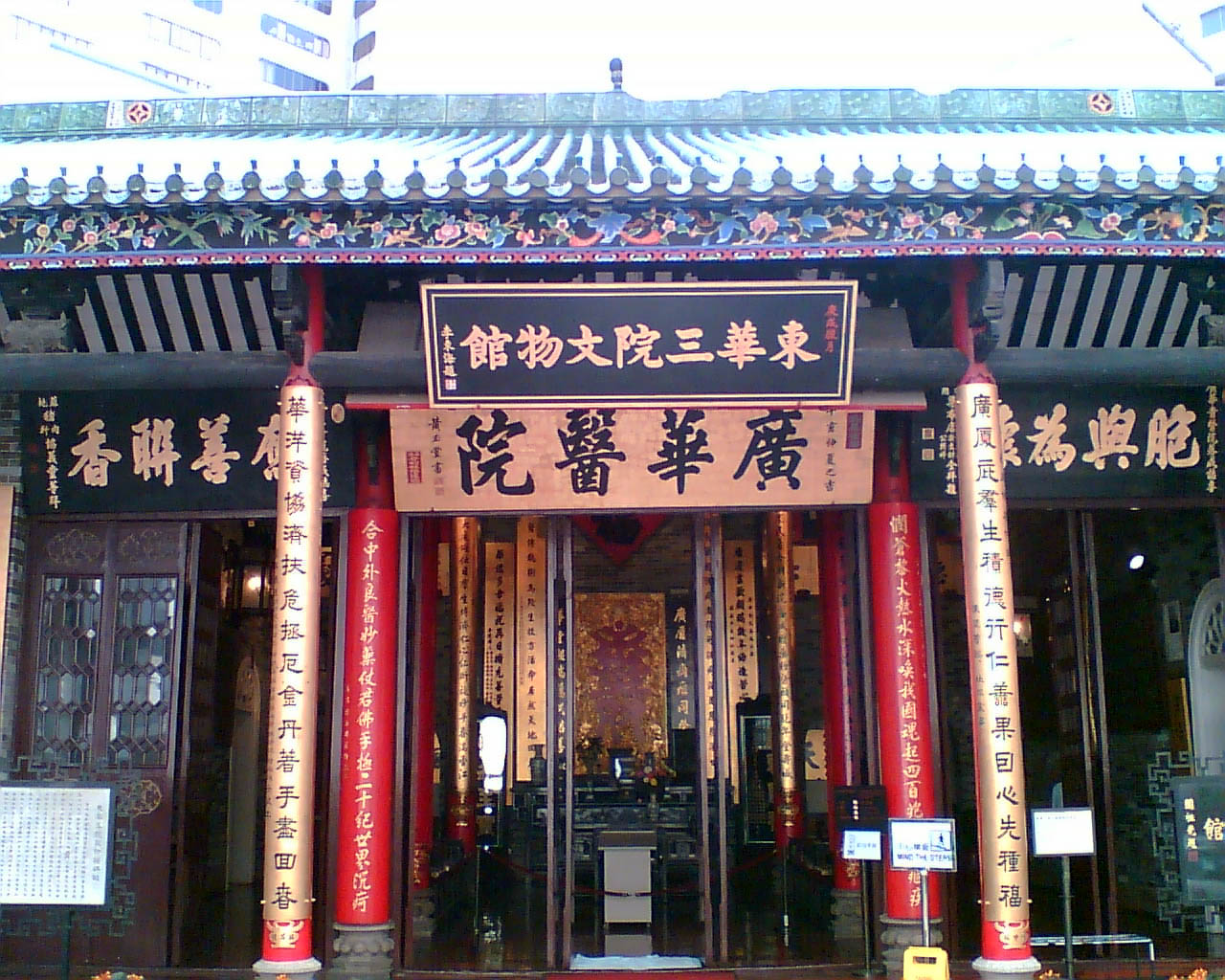
Kwong Wah Museum

Tung Wah Museum, at the centre of Kwong Wah Hospital, is a museum of traditional Chinese architecture of 1911. It was the main hall of original Kwong Wah Hospital serving as waiting hall for patients. In 1931, the hospital, together with Tung Wah Hospital and Tung Wah Eastern Hospital, formed Tung Wah Group of Hospitals. This hall survived during reconstruction of the hospital in 1958. The group converted it into museum and named Tung Wah Museum in 1970, in the centenary of the group, counting from the establishment of Tung Wah Hospital of 1870. The museum has collections of antique and records. It was declared a monument in 2010.

=== In's Point ===
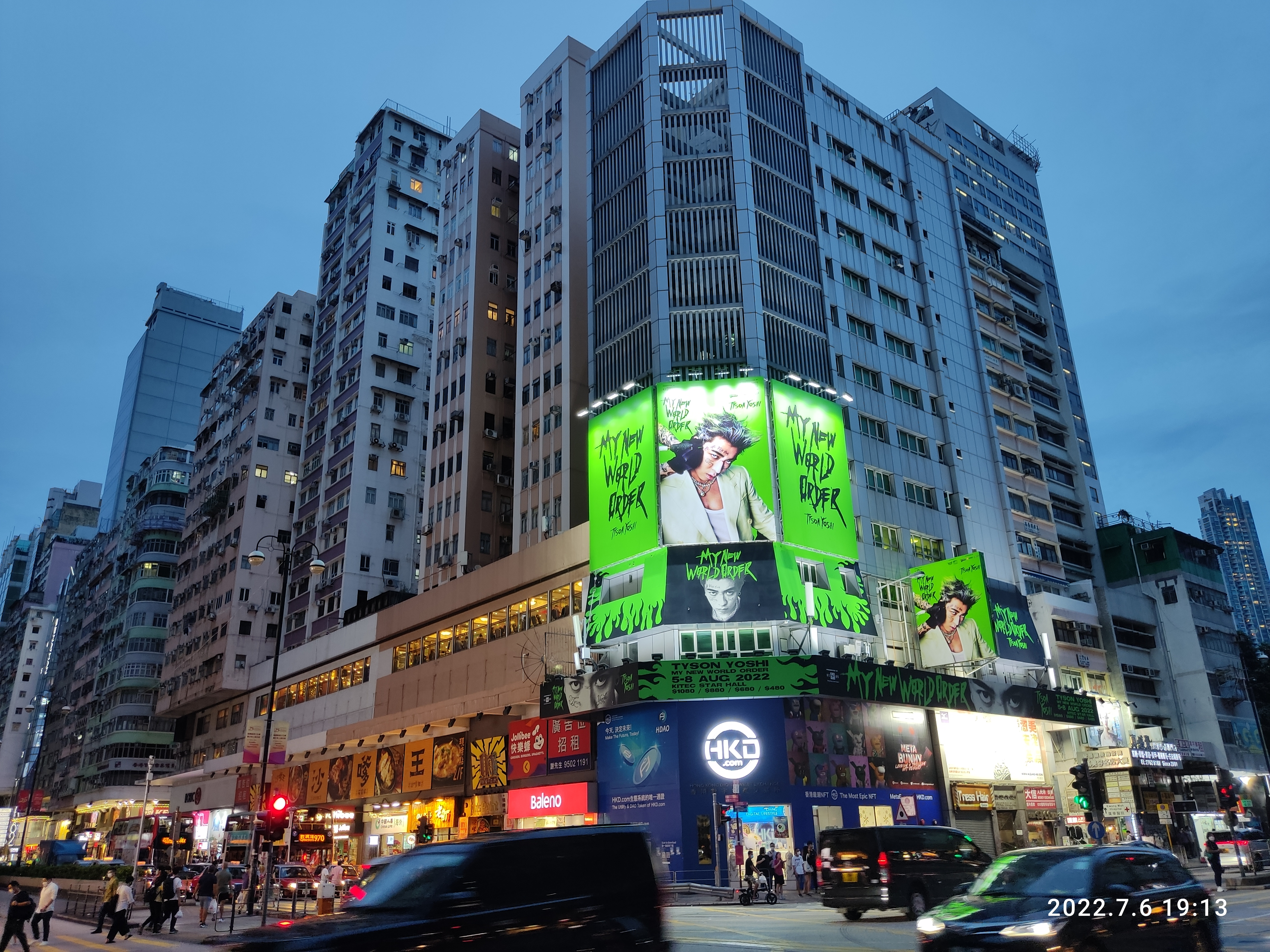
In's Point, on the left

In's Point, or In's Point Shopping Arcade, is a three-storey shopping centre above ground floor, south of Pitt Street, on east side of Nathan Road, formerly Chung Kiu Chinese Products Emporium. Inside, it divided into many small units, featuring with toy stores, especially LEGO minifigures, also vintage collectibles. The shopping centre turns active around six to seven o'clock in the evening when the business owners come after office. In evening the neon light turns on, resemble to old days of Hong Kong. Its whole top floor is occupied by Ho Choi Seafood Restaurant, a Cantonese restaurant.

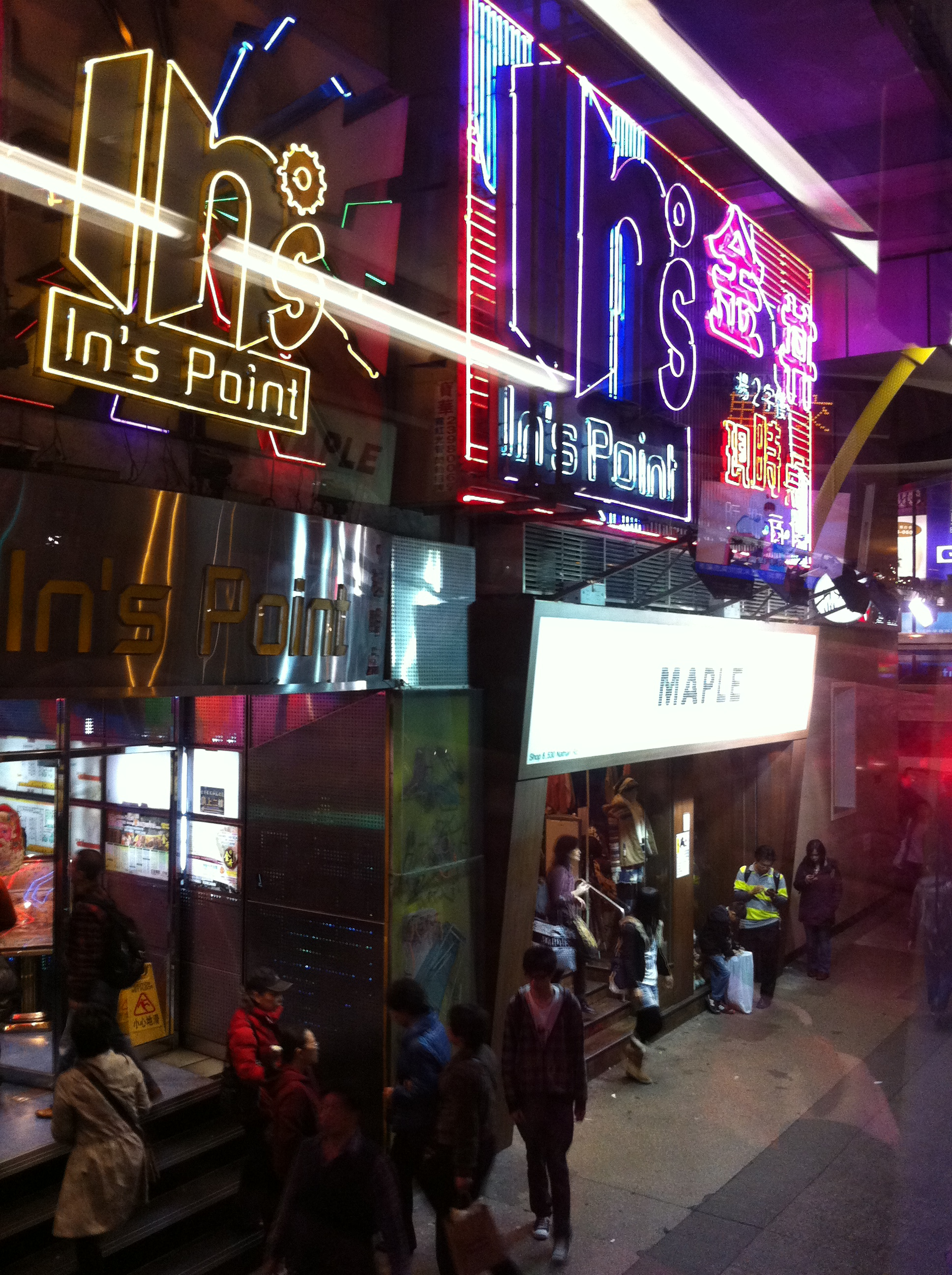
Old neon signs

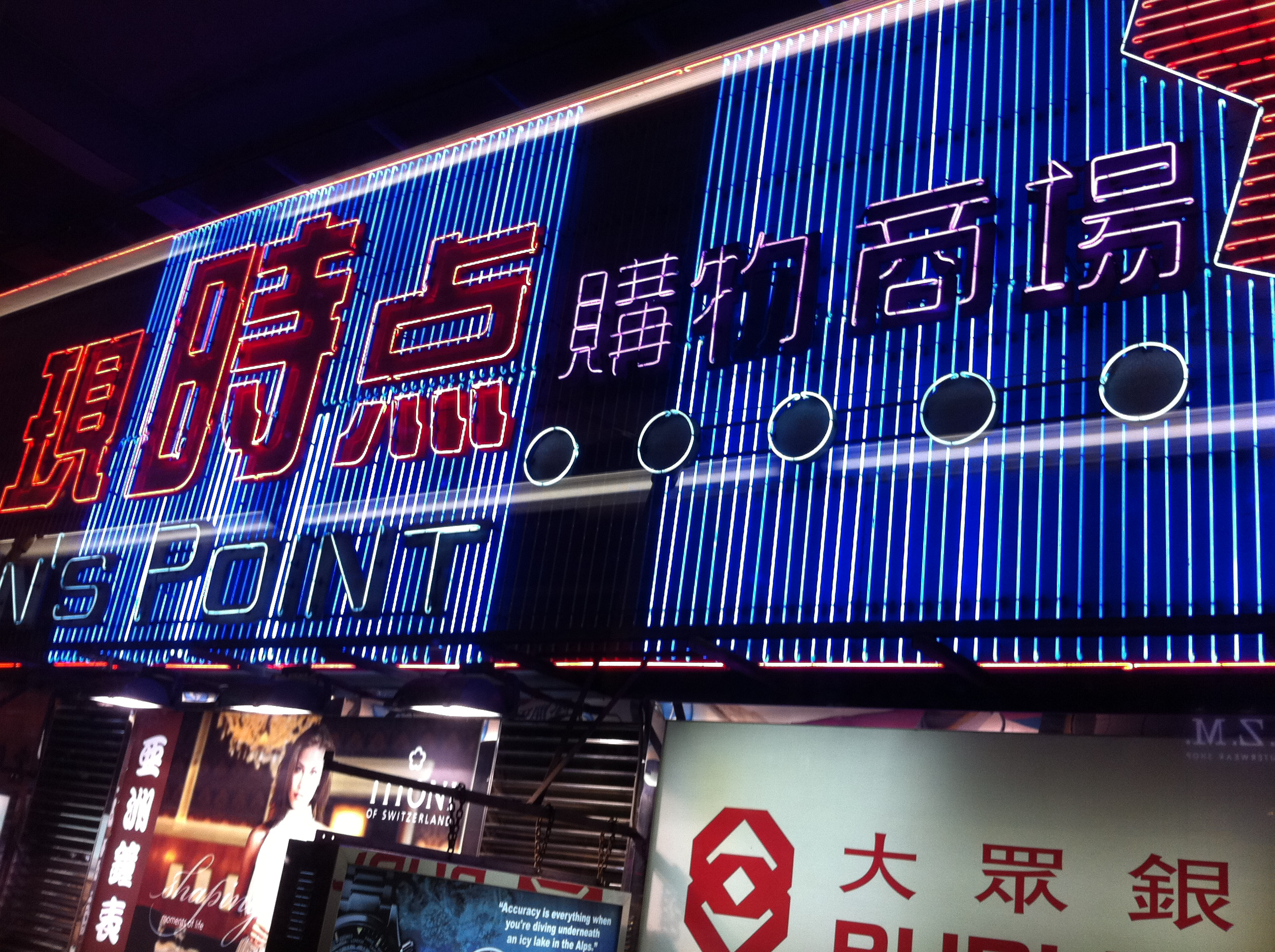
Old neon signs

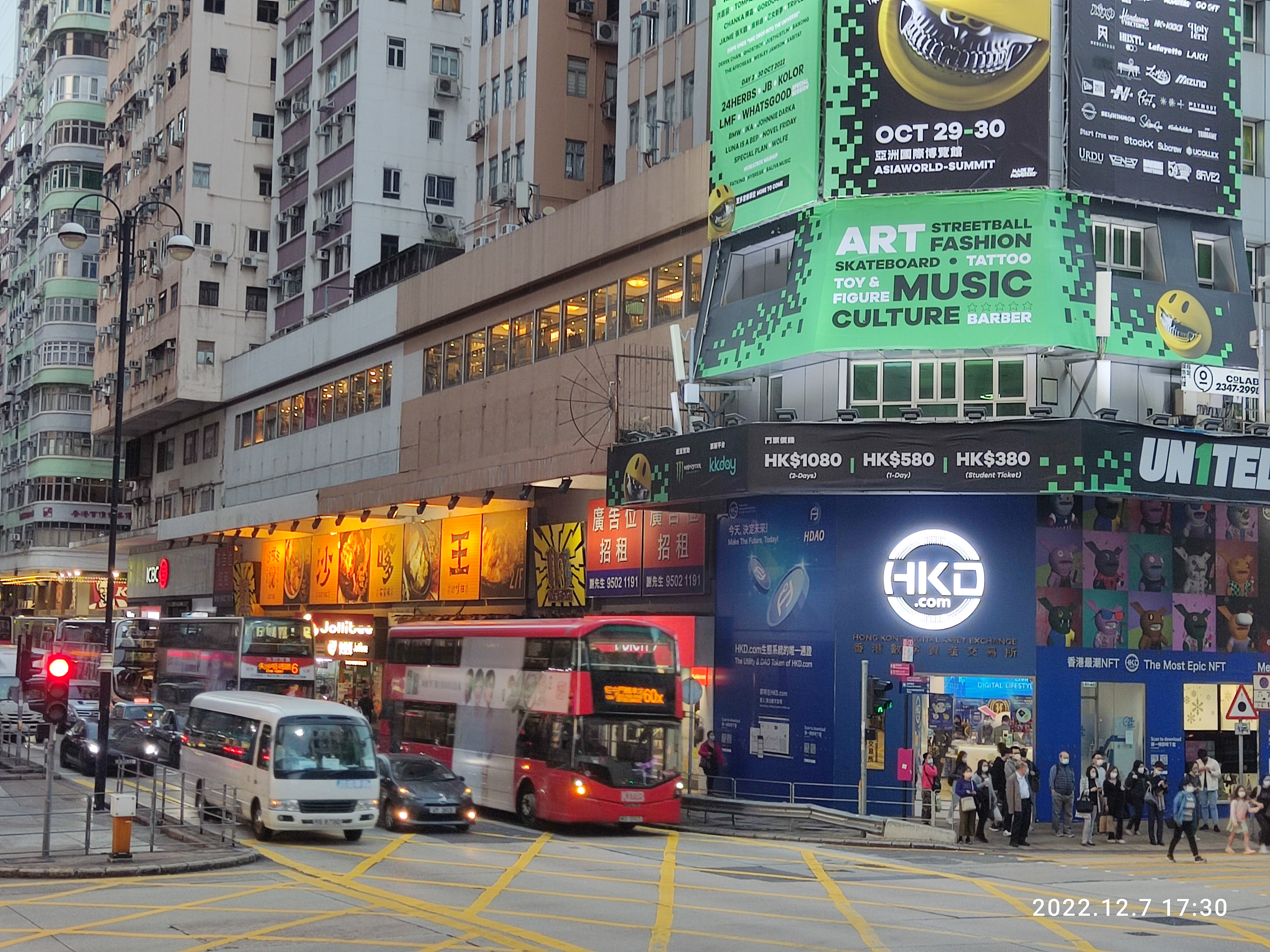
In day time

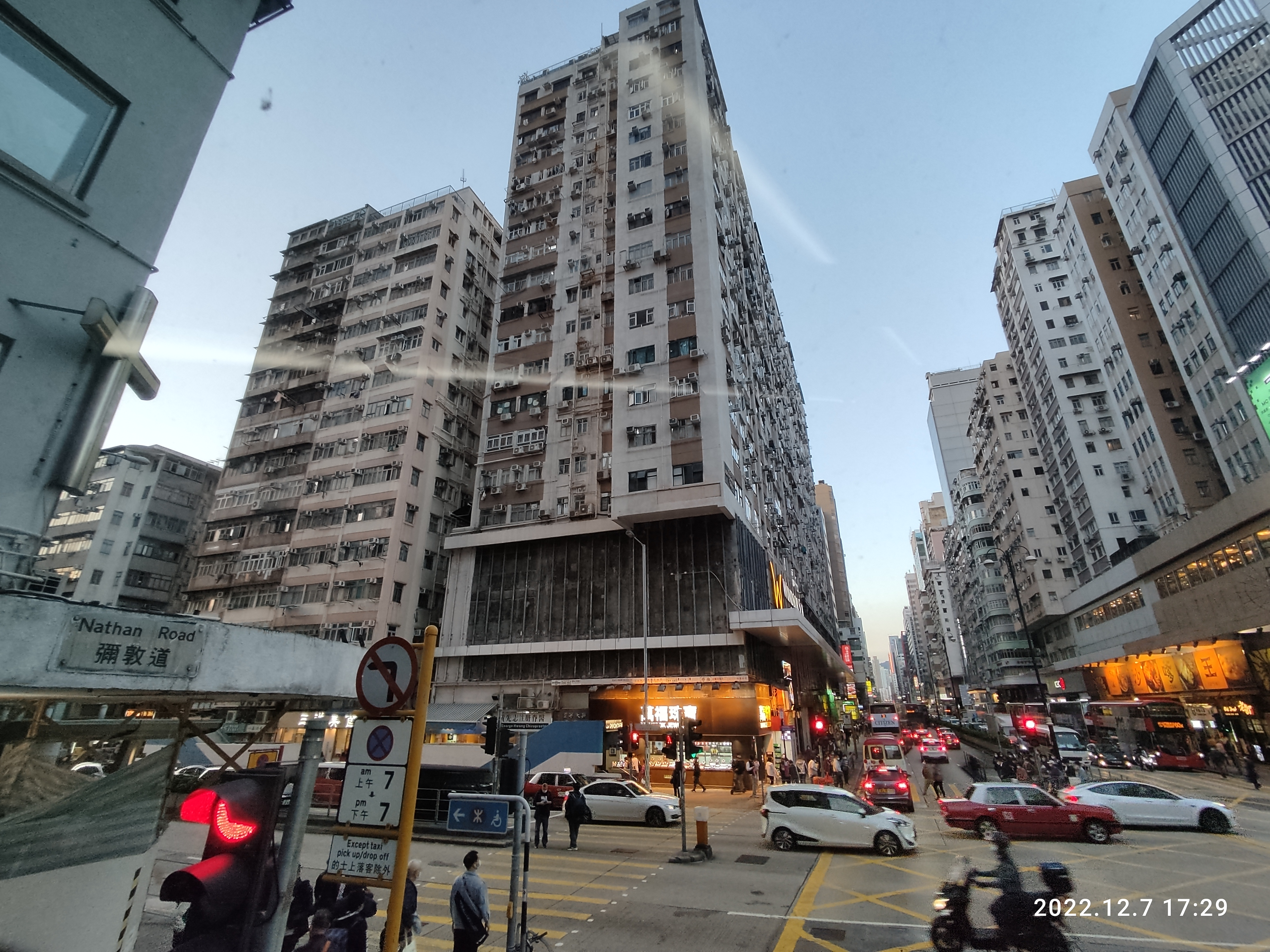
In's at the busy junction of Nathan Road and Waterloo Road

=== Ward Memorial Methodist Church and Yang Memorial Methodist Social Service ===
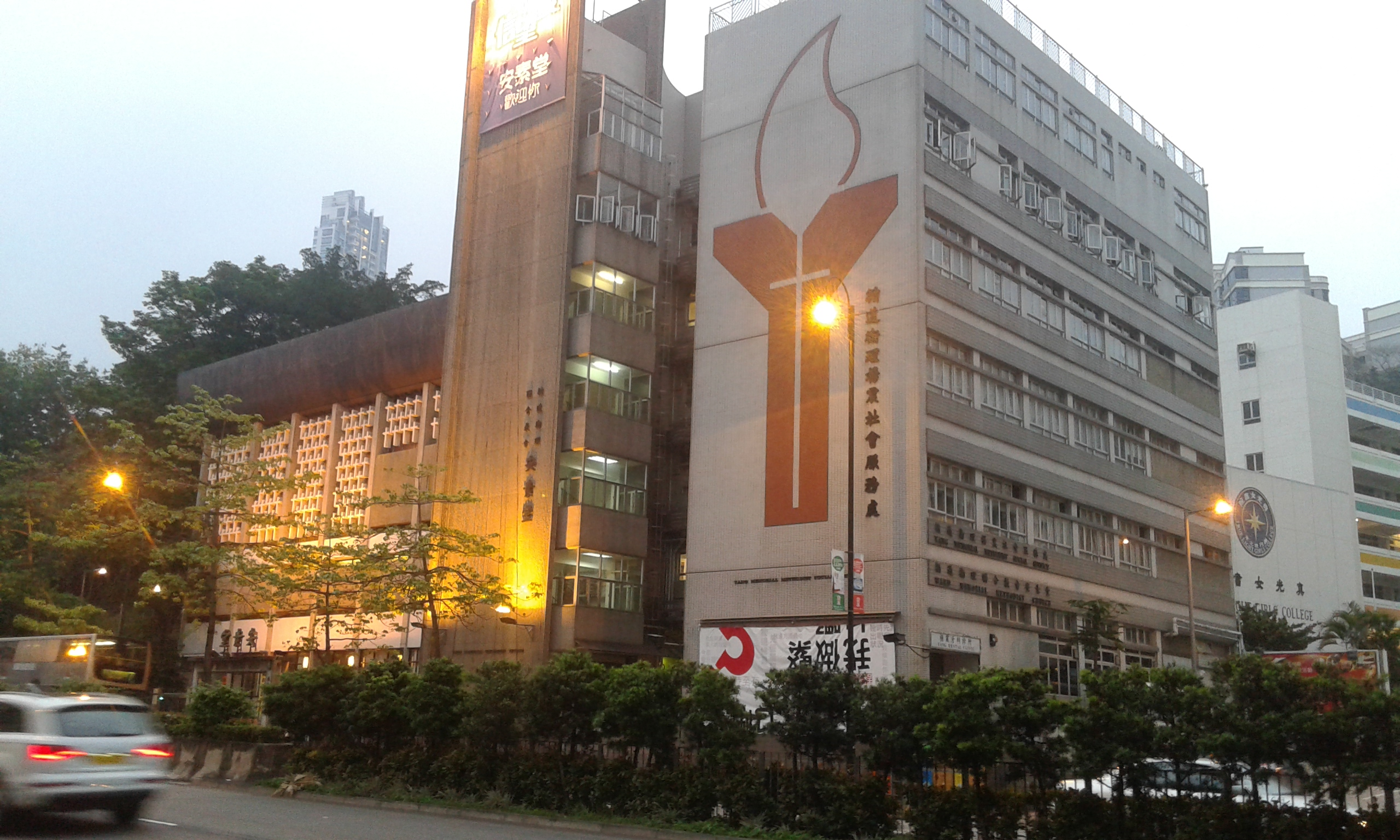
Church and Social Service

Ward Memorial Methodist Church, opposite to Pitt Street on Waterloo Road and Chun Yi Lane, is a Methodist church established in 1954, with church building completed in 1967. This church became a member of The Methodist Church, Hong Kong when British Methodist missionary and American Methodist missionary in Hong Kong merged into one Methodist church in 1975. It also hosts Yang Memorial Methodist Social Service, the church's organisation offering social service to public, established in 1967.

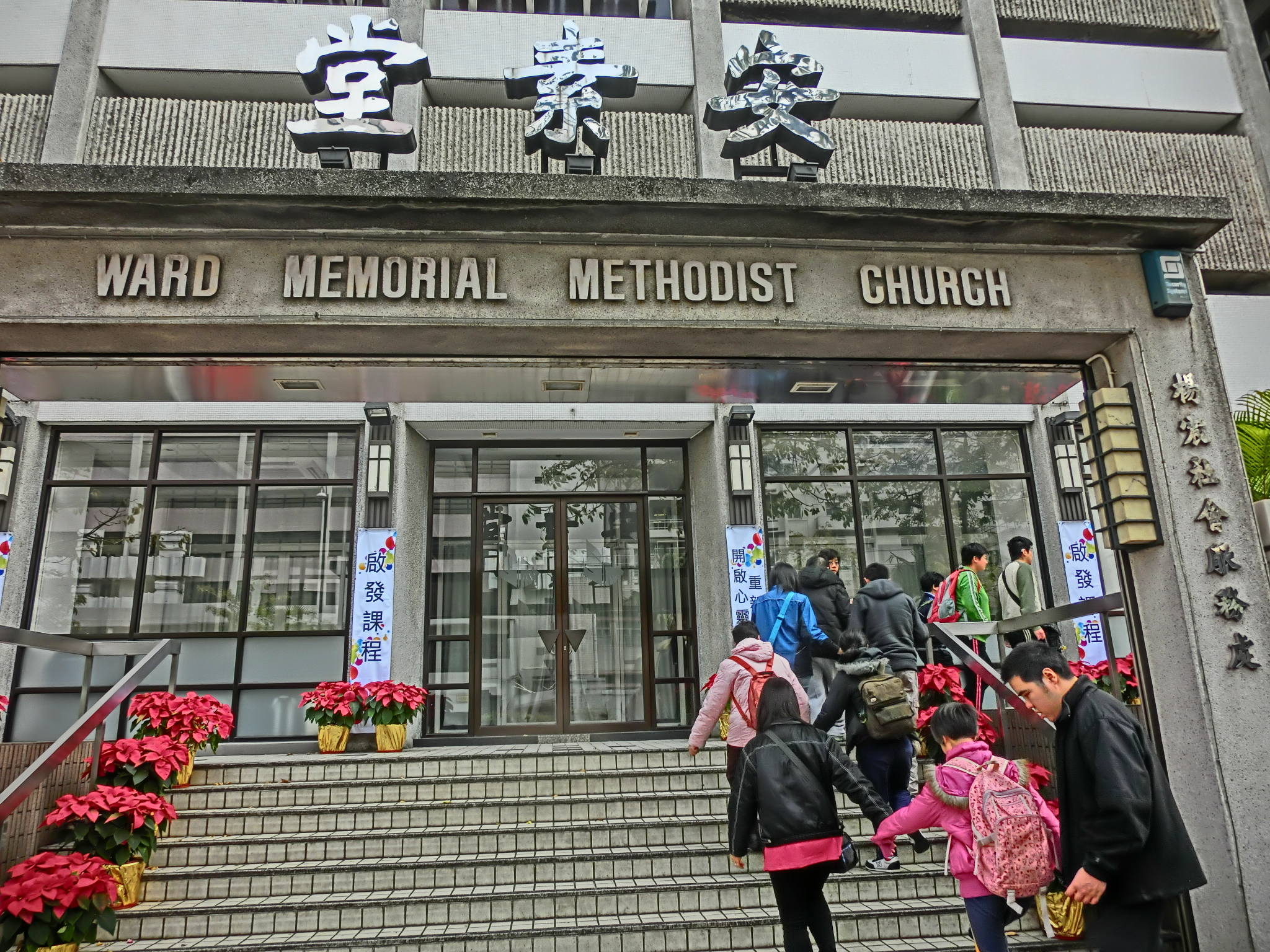
Front entrance of Ward Memorial Methodist Church

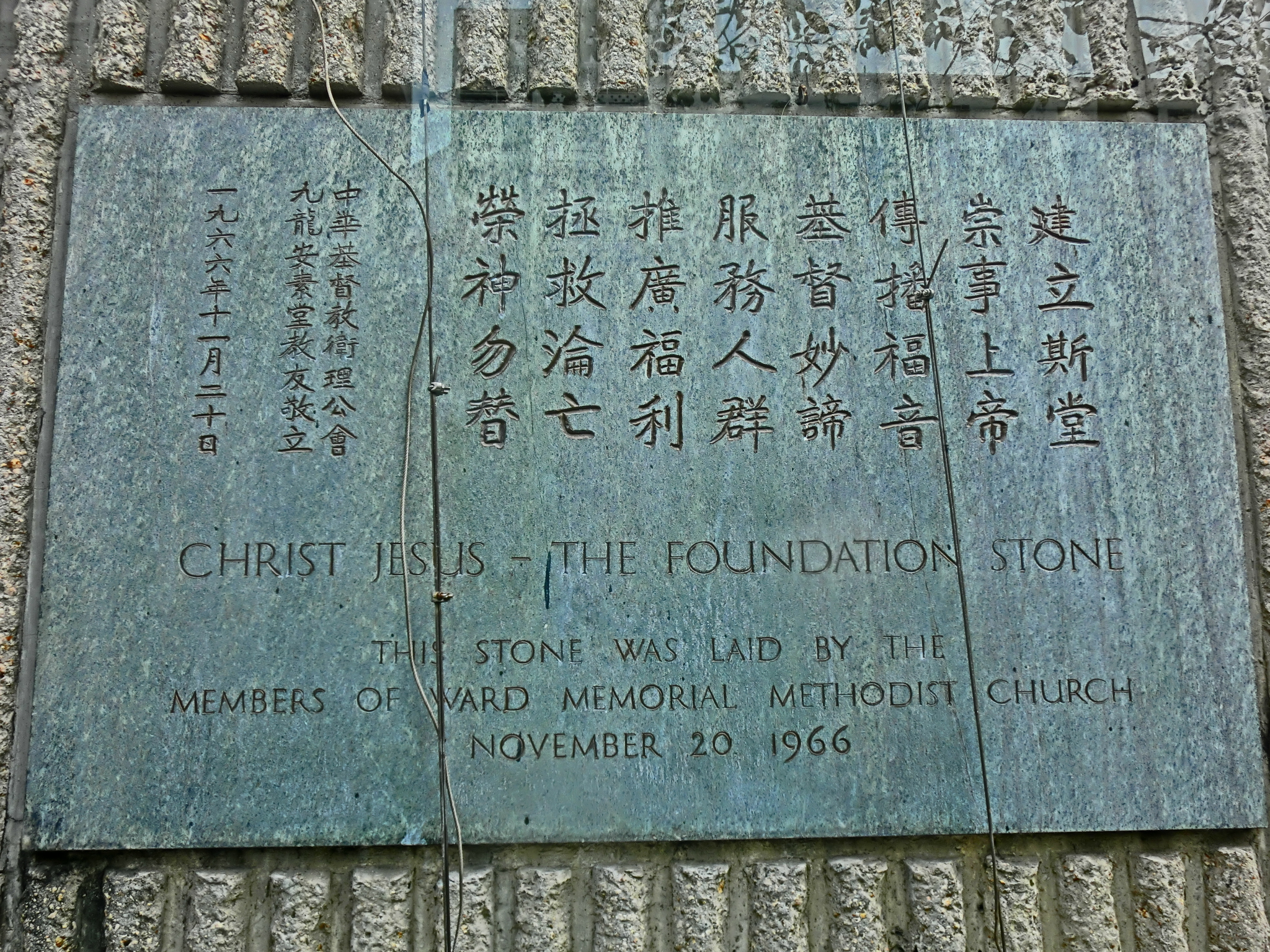
Founding stone

=== Truth Lutheran Church and Daosheng Bookstore ===
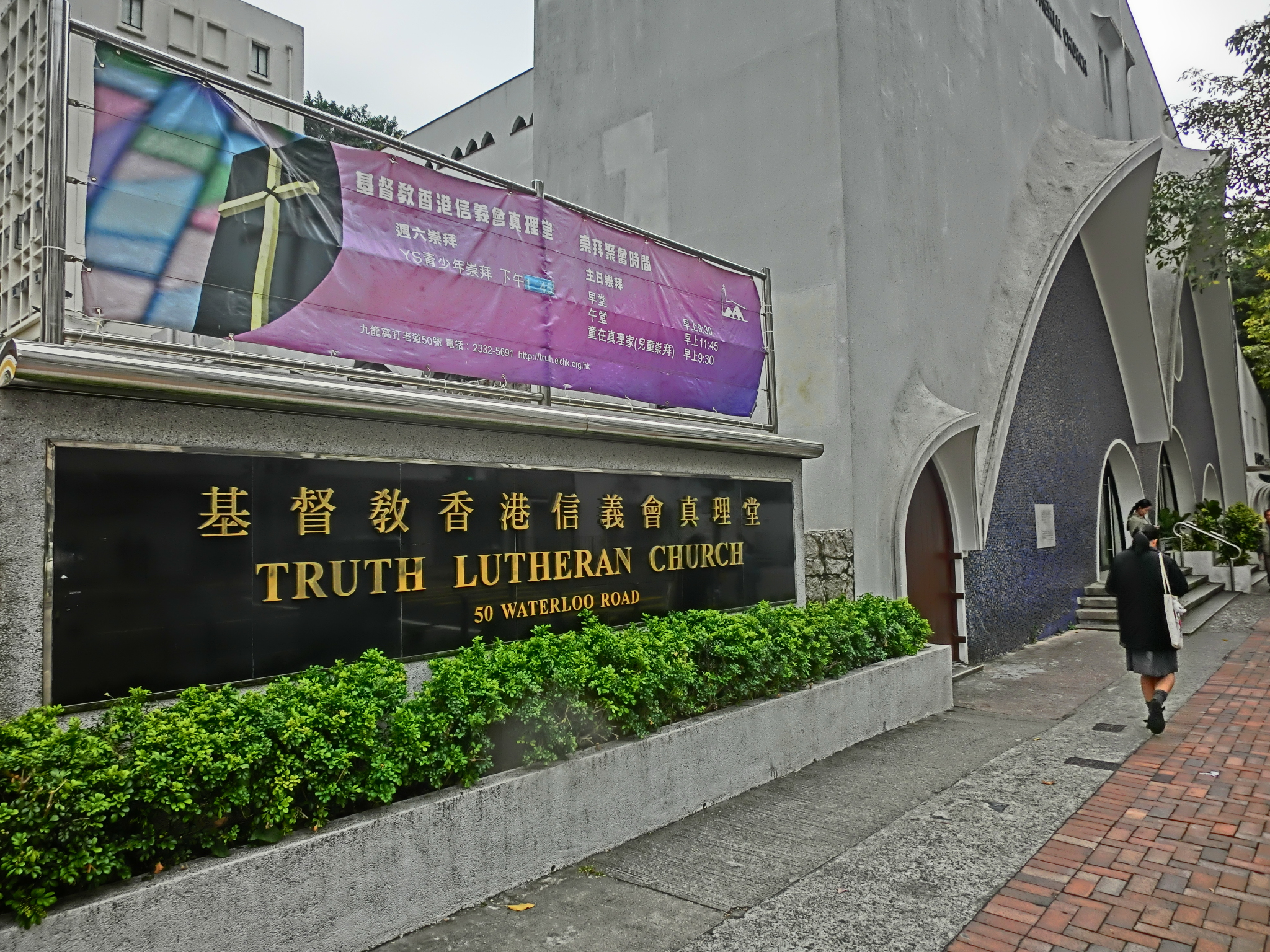
Truth Lutheran Church

Truth Lutheran Church, opposite to Pitt Street on Waterloo Road and Chun Yi Lane, is a Lutheran church established in 1963. It is also the head church of Evangelical Lutheran Church of Hong Kong. The church, designed by Eric Cumine, is a modernist church by style.

Taosheng Bookstore, a Christian bookstore, is at the south end of the church, providing books and materials for spiritual, life and Bible study.

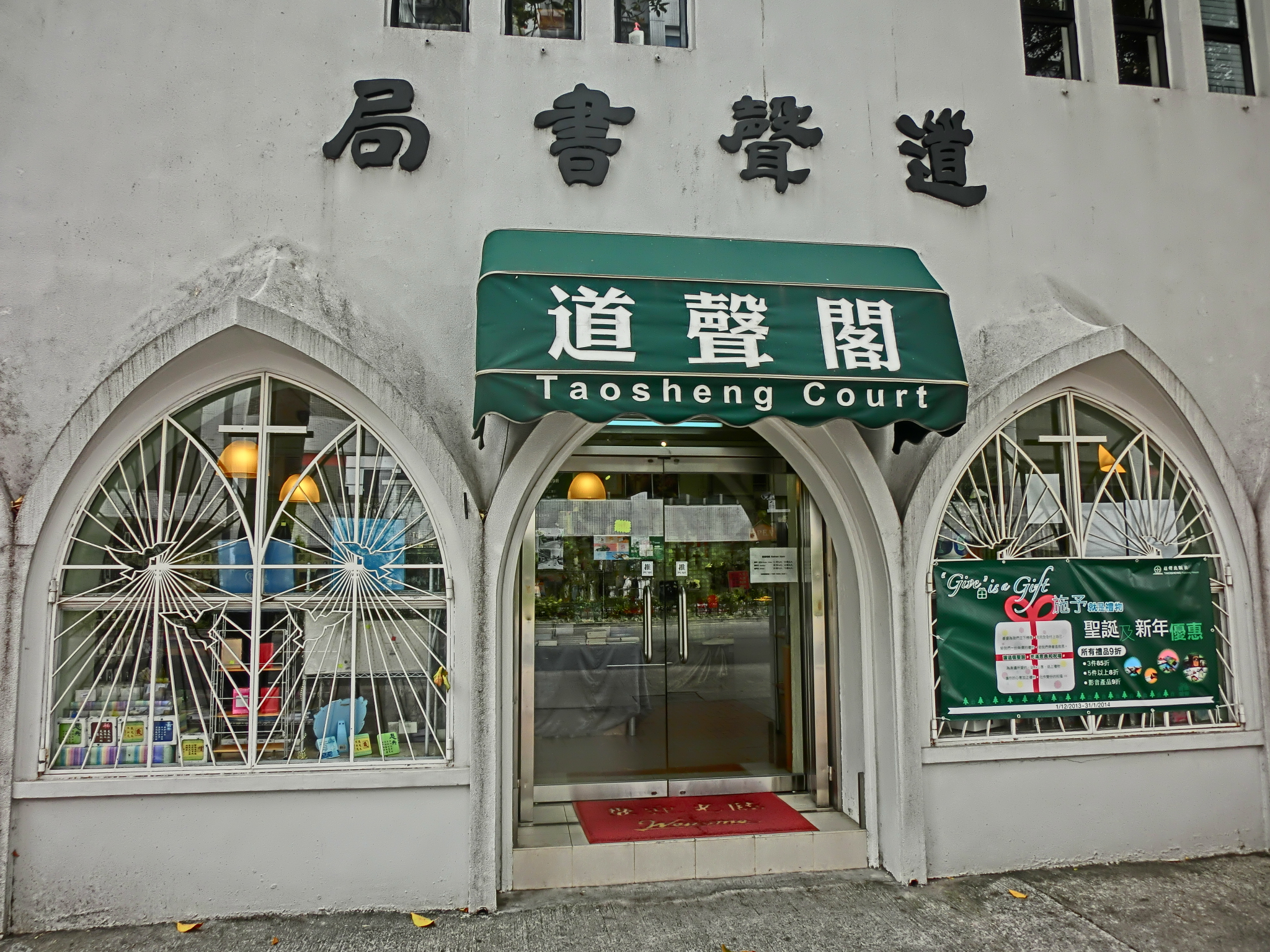
Taosheng bookstore

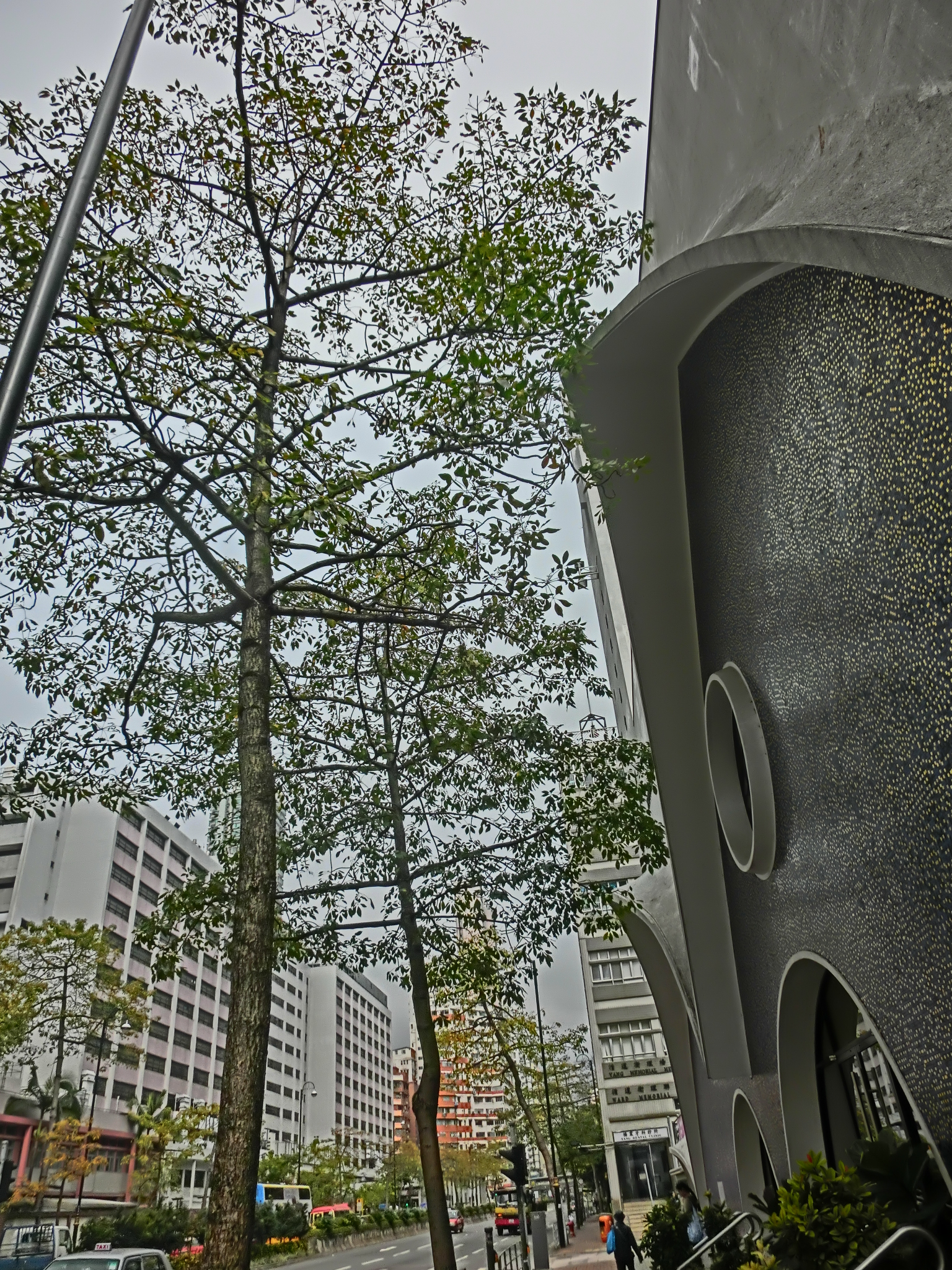
Another angle

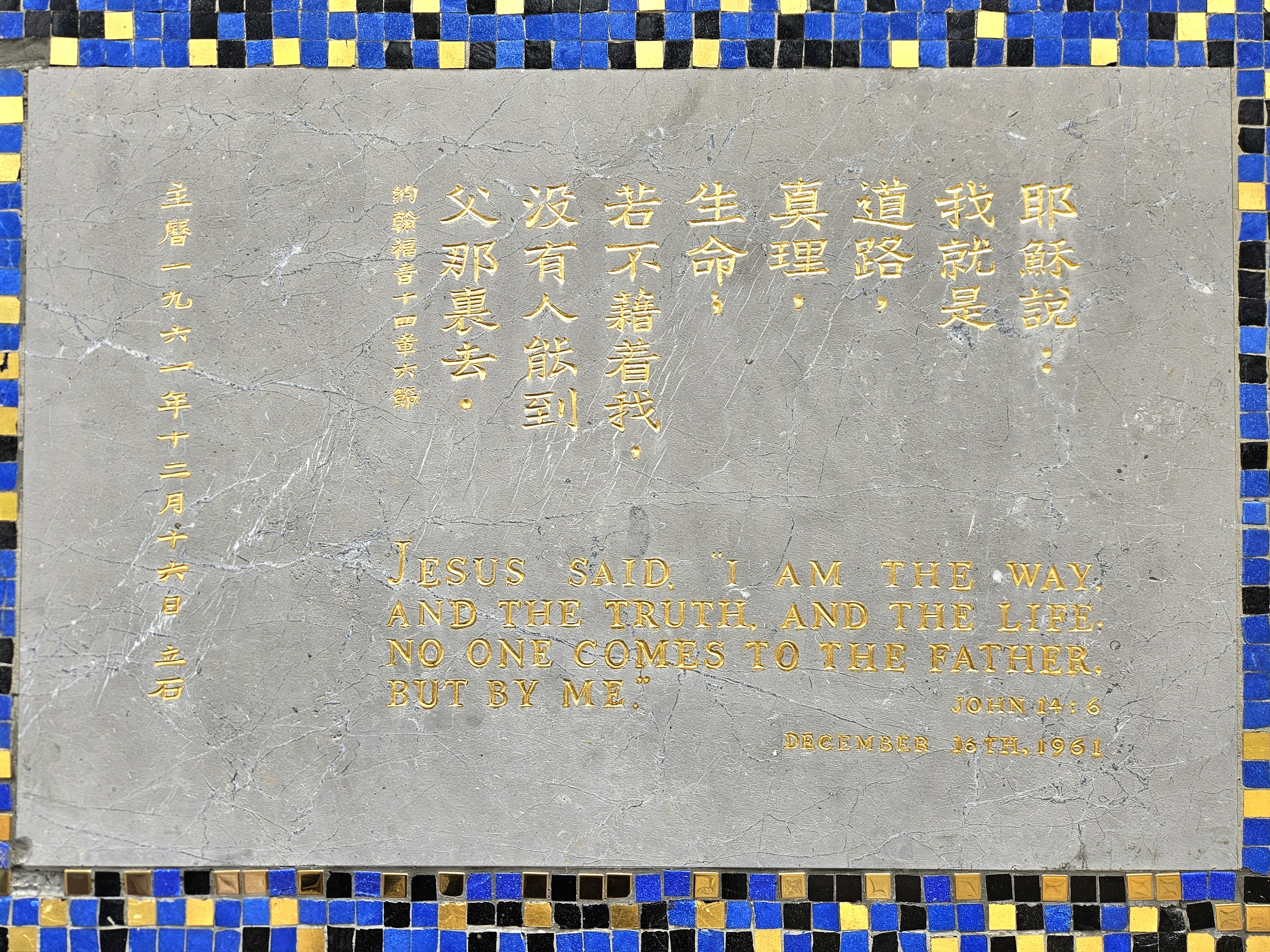
John 14:6

=== Waterloo Road/Ferry Street Sitting-out Area ===
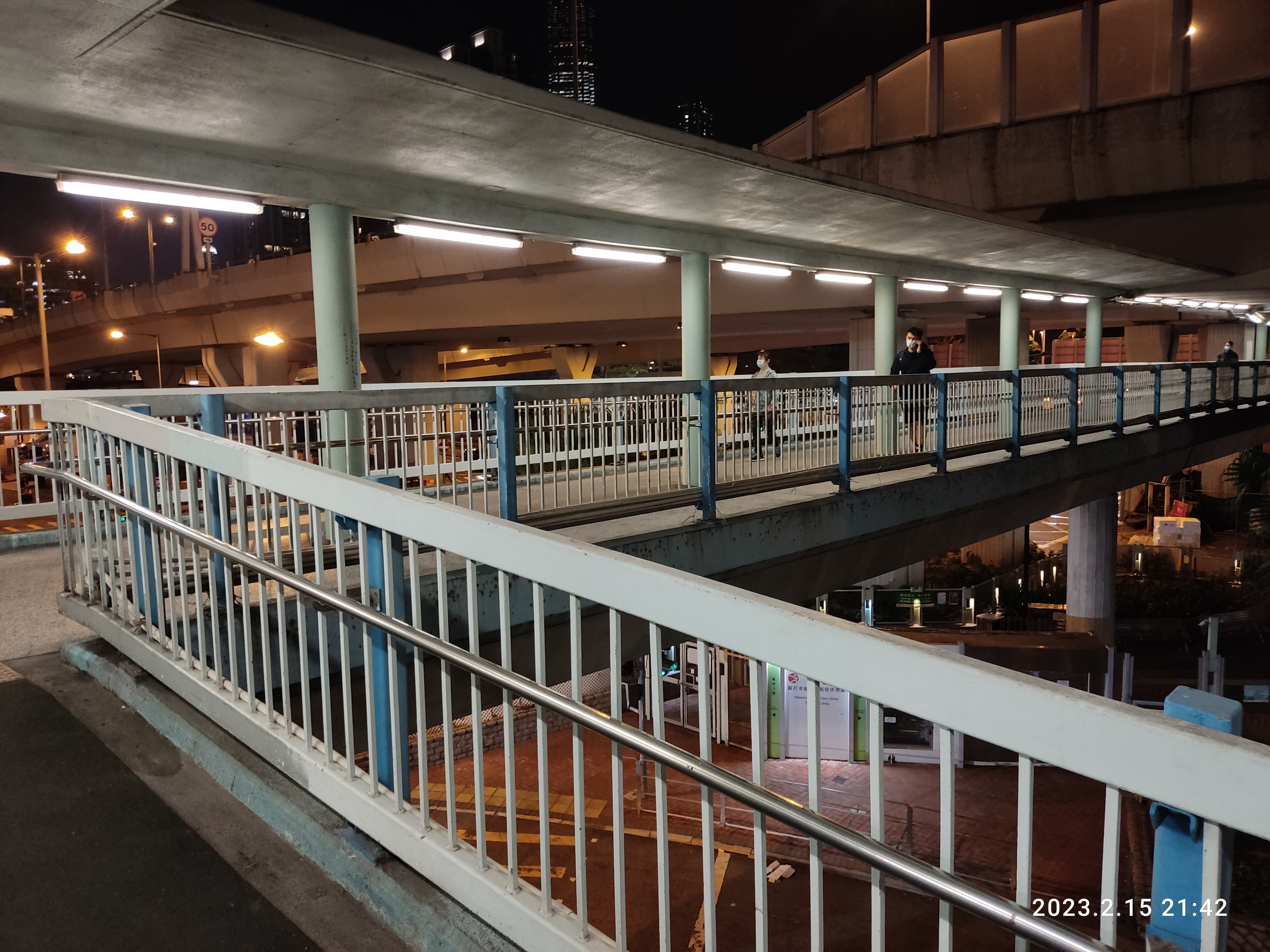
Sitting-out area is under Ferry Street Flyover on the right, viewing from a footbridge across Ferry Street

Waterloo Road/Ferry Street Sitting-out Area, opposite to the west end of Pitt Street, is a long pocket park under Ferry Street Flyover. It is a strip between two ways of Ferry Street, began with Waterloo Road in the south. The flyover serves as a large rain shelter to the park. The park features with pet garden and model car play area.
