= Nelson Street =

Street in Mong Kok, Kowloon, Hong Kong

Coordinates: 22°19′7.6″N 114°10′19.08″E

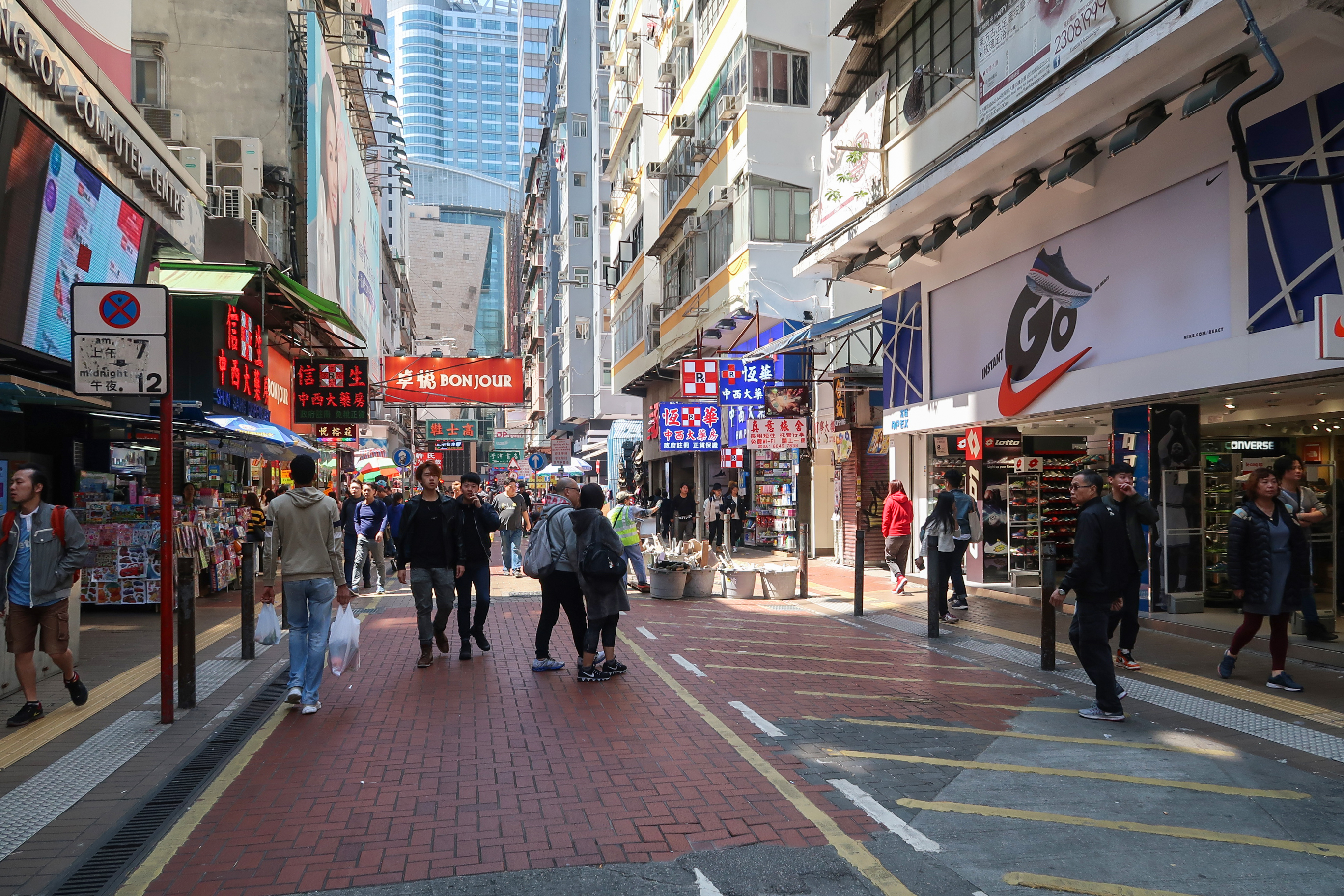
Nelson Street in March 2018

Nelson Street (Chinese: 奶路臣街) is a street in Mong Kok, Kowloon, Hong Kong, China. The street is 240 metres in length and runs in the east–west direction. It can be accessed from exits E1 and E2 of the Mong Kok station. The section between Portland and Sai Yeung Choi South Street is closed to vehicular traffic.

== Name ==
The street was named after Horatio Nelson, 1st Viscount Nelson, a British flag officer in the Royal Navy.

== Features ==
- Mong Kok Computer Centre
- Macpherson Stadium
- Langham Place

== Intersections ==
- Hak Po Street
- Tung Choi Street (Ladies Market)
- Sai Yee Street
- Fa Yuen Street
- Nathan Road
- Portland Street
- Shanghai Street
- Sai Yeung Choi Street
- Reclamation Street
- Canton Road
- Ferry Street
