= Hong Kong acid attacks =

Series of crimes in Hong Kong

Mong Kok acid attacks
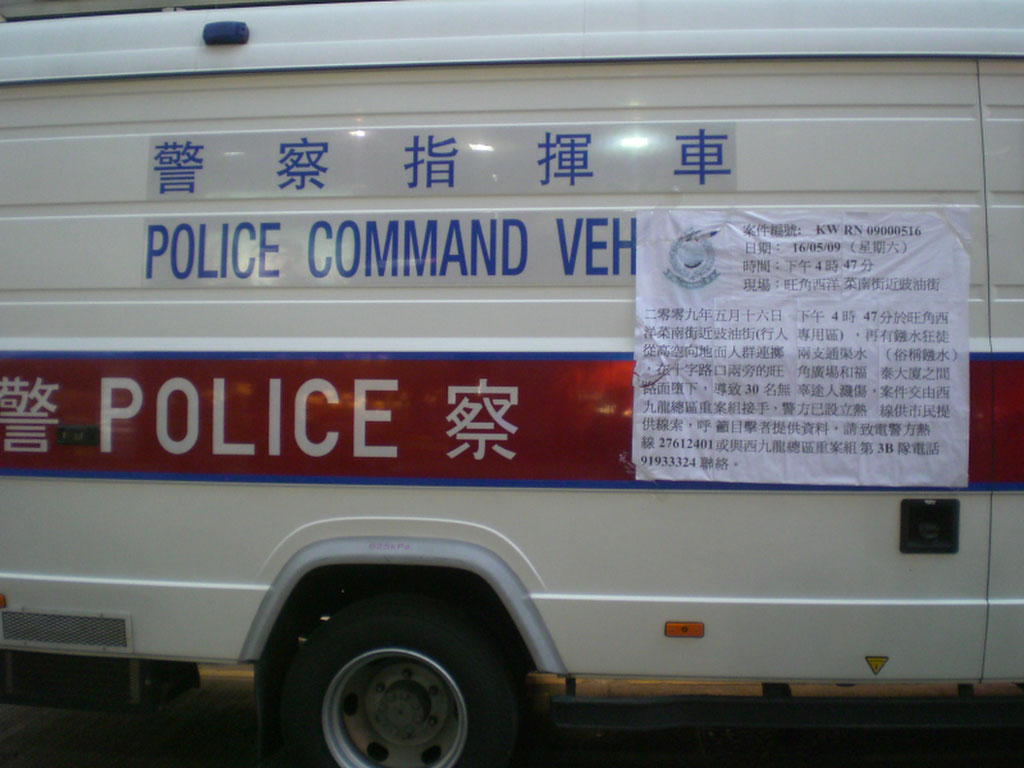
- Notice about the acid attack incident in May 2009 displayed on a police vehicle.
- Location: Several along Sai Yeung Choi Street South, Mong Kok, Hong Kong
- Date: 13 December 2008, at 5:15 pm; 16 May 2009, at 4:47 pm; 8 June 2009, at 8 pm; 9 January 2010, at 9:30 pm (UTC+8)
- Attack type: Acid attacks
- Weapon: Plastic bottles full of corrosive liquid
- Deaths: 0
- Injuries: 130 total (mostly minor) (46+30+24+30)
- Perpetrator: Unknown

The Mong Kok acid attacks (旺角高空投擲腐蝕性液體傷人案) were a series of acid attacks from 2008 to 2010 where plastic bottles filled with drain cleaner, a corrosive liquid, were thrown onto shoppers on Sai Yeung Choi Street South, Hong Kong, a pedestrian street and popular shopping area. Originally, a reward of HK$100,000 was offered for information about the perpetrator(s), but following the second incident it was raised to HK$300,000, and cameras were planned to be installed in the area. The third incident occurred the very day the cameras were turned on. The fifth incident happened after Hong Kong government announced its new strategies against the incident.

== 13 December 2008 incident ==
The first incident occurred on 13 December at 5:15 pm near the intersection of Sai Yeung Choi Street South and Shantung Street. Two bottles of an unspecified corrosive liquid were hurled into the crowd, possibly from the 12th floor of the Yuen King Building, onto a popular pedestrianised street area below where many were Christmas shopping.

The bottles hit the ground and exploded, which splashed 46 people with corrosive fluids that burned through clothes and skin. People took refuge in nearby shops where water was poured onto the spilled acid to dilute it. Only minor injuries occurred, and by the next day all of the victims were released from the hospital. Two days after the attack, Hong Kong Chief Executive Donald Tsang personally came to examine the area.

On 16 December, investigation of the attack closed the intersection for approximately two hours. Police re-enacted the incident by throwing bottles of chalk powder from several vantage points to gauge the exact point the acid may have been thrown from. Water was also poured on the ground to provide a better examination of splash and flow patterns. Additionally, police went door to door to interview potential witnesses. That same day, a reward of HK$100,000 (approx. US$12,800) was offered for any information about the attack, officially classified as "throwing corrosive fluid with intent to do grievous bodily harm”. The maximum punishment for this crime is life imprisonment. An individual claiming to be a Triad member later claimed online to have committed the attack, but the person was never traced.

A month after the attack, Yau Tsim Mong District Council voted to install four CCTV cameras in various areas with the specific aim of deterring people from illegally dumping waste or trash from buildings, as well as preventing similar incidents from occurring. One of the cameras was installed on Hollywood Plaza at Soy Street and Sai Yeung Choi Street South. The system stores encrypted videos for 10 days after they are recorded.

== 16 May 2009 incident ==
A second incident, almost identical to the first, occurred on 16 May 2009 again in Sai Yeung Choi Street South. Two bottles were again thrown, this time near the Soy Street intersection, 150 metres (490 ft) from the original attack. The attack occurred around 4:47 pm, resulting in injuries to 30 persons, with all but one being released from the hospital the same day. A 16-year-old female remained in the hospital for several days afterward. Donald Tsang again came to visit the area and urged the district council to accelerate the installation of CCTV cameras. The next day, the original reward for information was increased to HK$300,000. There was suspicion that both cases were committed by the same perpetrator, although the nature of the liquid thrown in both cases had not been made public as of 20 May 2009, and police commissioner Tang King Shing said there was no formal indication of a link.

A second reconstitution was performed early on 20 May, in which a number of bottles (several filled with acid) were thrown from several buildings. The area was cordoned off and nearby shops were covered, with the Food and Environmental Hygiene Department cleaning the area afterward. Two buildings, the Pakpolee Commercial Centre and Foo Tai Building were thus identified as "possible locations".

An unrelated incident had occurred approximately one week before the second attack. Four persons were injured on 4 May, in Tsuen Wan District when a woman attempting to clear an ant nest spilled a mix of bleach, acid and insecticide onto the street below. The incident, which injured a police officer and a baby girl, was initially thought to be a possible copycat of the December attack. The woman, who had just moved to the 12th-story flat on Heung Woo Street, was arrested.

== 8 June 2009 incident ==
On 8 June, a few hours after the announced cameras had been turned on, a third attack occurred around 8 pm at the intersection of Nelson and Sai Yeung Choi streets. Three hundred police officers flocked to the area in an attempt to capture the culprit. The modus operandi was very similar to the first two attacks, and resulted in 24 injuries, including several tourists. Yau Tsim Mong district councillor Hau Wing-Cheong noted: "This acid throwing is obviously a challenge to the police. It is an unscrupulous crime. The formal operation of the sky eyes was not supposed to be known by outsiders and the district council had planned to announce it after a meeting on Tuesday." Several detective teams were dispatched from other units, such as the anti-triad unit and blue-beret police. In light of the poor quality of the recorded images, councillor Henry Chan Man-Yu called the HK$1.7 million system "a waste of money", and another councillor criticised the government for failing to inform the councillors of the purchasing and tendering process.

The attack elicited outraged reactions from several Hong Kong politicians, who, like Wing-Cheong, noted that the attack was clearly a direct insult to the police. Legislative Councilor Paul Tse Wai-Chun noted his worry about Hong Kong's reputation for safety, since several tourists had been injured: "We don't want our good name being tarnished overnight by the attacker. Police have to gear up to make an arrest to help regain the confidence of tourists." The government's total bounty for information soon reached HK$900,000, while Donald Tsang called the attacks "cold-blooded and malicious" in a televised broadcast. Meanwhile, local business owners began to grow concerned and many stocked water in case of a fourth incident.

== 6 September 2009 incident ==
An incident unrelated to the mass attacks of the summer occurred in the evening of 6 September at Tung Choi Street. A shopkeeper couple (Ah Dee and his wife Tam Chan) were assaulted by a man who had come to recover HK$300,000 that they owed him. During the argument, the man, surnamed Tsz, "whipped out a bottle of acid and splashed the couple" causing severe injuries to both and minor injuries to nine others. He was captured on the scene, the wife having chased him, shouting, and thus attracting the attention of nearby police officers. Ah Dee had to be transferred to Queen Mary Hospital for an emergency skin graft. Others were treated at Kwong Wah Hospital and, except for Tam, discharged later that evening.

== 9 January 2010 incident ==
On 10 January 2010, police in Hong Kong arrested a man suspected of carrying out an acid attack in Temple Street that injured 30 people. The following day police ruled him out as a suspect.
