= Mong Kok Tsui =

Cape in Hong Kong

Coordinates: 22.31798°N 114.16775°E

Mong Kok Tsui (Chinese: 芒角嘴 or 旺角嘴) was a cape located in the western portion of present-day Mong Kok, Hong Kong. It is located near where Shantung Street and Nelson Street situate. Infilling and levelling of hills absorb the cape in the early 20th Century

The name of Mong Kok Tsui was gradually eclipsed by Mong Kok, as reflected by Mong Kok Tsui Market which was later renamed Mong Kok Market.
