= Weave living =

Real estate company based in Hong Kong

- Type: Private
- Industry: Real estate
- Founded: 2017
- Founder: Sachin Doshi
- Headquarters: Hong Kong
- Area served: Asia-Pacific
- Key people: Sachin Doshi (CEO)
- Website: weave-living.com

Weave living is a real estate company based in Hong Kong. The company was founded in 2017 by Sachin Doshi. It develops and manages rental housing in the Asia-Pacific region, including co-living studios, serviced and furnished apartments, luxury apartments and student housing.

== History ==
Weave Living opened its first property, Weave on Boundary, in Prince Edward, Hong Kong, in August 2018. In November 2018, the private equity firm Warburg Pincus invested in the company.

The company entered Singapore in 2022 by acquiring Hotel Clover J. Sultan for US$56 million. In August 2022, it formed a US$140 million joint venture with LaSalle Investment Management to acquire properties in Hong Kong and Singapore. In 2023, it expanded into Japan.

In February 2024, Weave Living and BlackRock formed a S$188 million (US$140 million) joint venture that acquired Citadines Mount Sophia in Singapore for S$148 million. The same year, it partnered with KKR to invest in multi-family housing in Japan, starting with 439 units in Tokyo. In April 2024, it entered South Korea by acquiring the State Sunyu building near Seoul's Yeouido business district with KKR. By February 2025, it operated three properties in Singapore with 330 units.
