= Prince Edward, Hong Kong =

Area of Mong Kok, Kowloon, Hong Kong

Coordinates: 22.3246°N 114.1673°E

Prince Edward
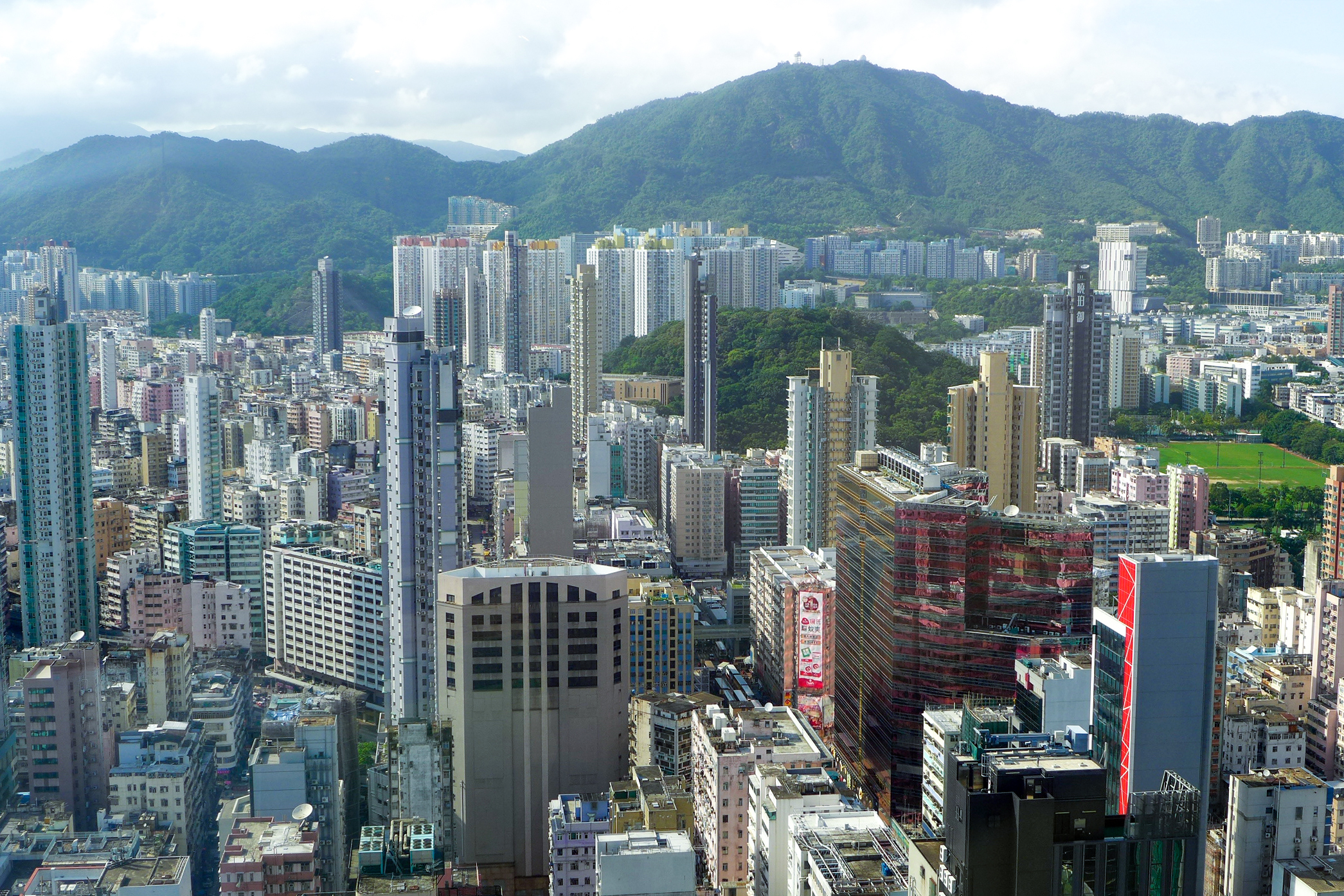
- Prince Edward skyline (2015)
- Chinese: 太子
- Literal meaning: Crown Prince
Transcriptions
Standard Mandarin
- Hanyu Pinyin: Tàizǐ
Yue: Cantonese
- Jyutping: taai3 zi2
- IPA: [tʰāːi tɕǐː]

Prince Edward is an area of Mong Kok south of Tong Mi surrounding Prince Edward station in Kowloon, Hong Kong. Named after Prince Edward Road West, the Prince Edward station of the MTR rapid transit system is an interchange station on the Tsuen Wan and the Kwun Tong lines.

== Location & History ==
Prince Edward is located in the northern part of Mong Kok on either side of Nathan Road, administratively under the Yau Tsim Mong District (until the mid-1990s part of the Mong Kok District). Prince Edward contains the northern end of Nathan Road. Prince Edward is shown on Google Maps as bounded by:

- Boundary Street to the North
- Waterloo Road to the East
- Prince Edward Road West, Sai Yee Street and Bute Street to the South
- Canton Road and Lai Chi Kok Road to the West

Originally, the area around Prince Edward was known as Tong Mi. As Prince Edward Rd was developed in the 1920s, Edward VIII, then the Prince of Wales visited Hong Kong. The road was named after him and later became adopted for the wider area.

== Transport ==
The area is served by the Prince Edward Station of the MTR rapid transit system on both the Tsuen Wan line and the Kwun Tong line. Access to Mong Kok East station includes an entrance via the MOKO shopping centre on Prince Edward Road West.

== Policing ==
Mong Kok Police Station is on Prince Edward Road West. The police station is adjacent to Prince Edward MTR station exit B1.

== Sport and recreation ==
Mong Kok Stadium (Chinese: 旺角大球場) is a sports venue with capacity of 6,769. It hosts Hong Kong Premier League football matches, with Southern and Kitchee currently ground-sharing the venue as their home ground. The stadium is run by the Leisure and Cultural Services Department of Hong Kong.

== Markets ==
Although Prince Edward area is perceived as part of Mong Kok the following markets are closer to the Prince Edward station:

- Flower Market Road (花墟道)
- Goldfish Street (金魚街) or Goldfish Market — Centered around the section of Tung Choi Street
- Yuen Po Street Bird Garden (園圃街雀鳥花園)
- Ladies' Street (女人街, Ladies' market on Tung Choi Street)

== See also ==
- List of buildings, sites and areas in Hong Kong
- 2019 Prince Edward station attack
