= Soy Street =

Street in Mong Kok, Hong Kong

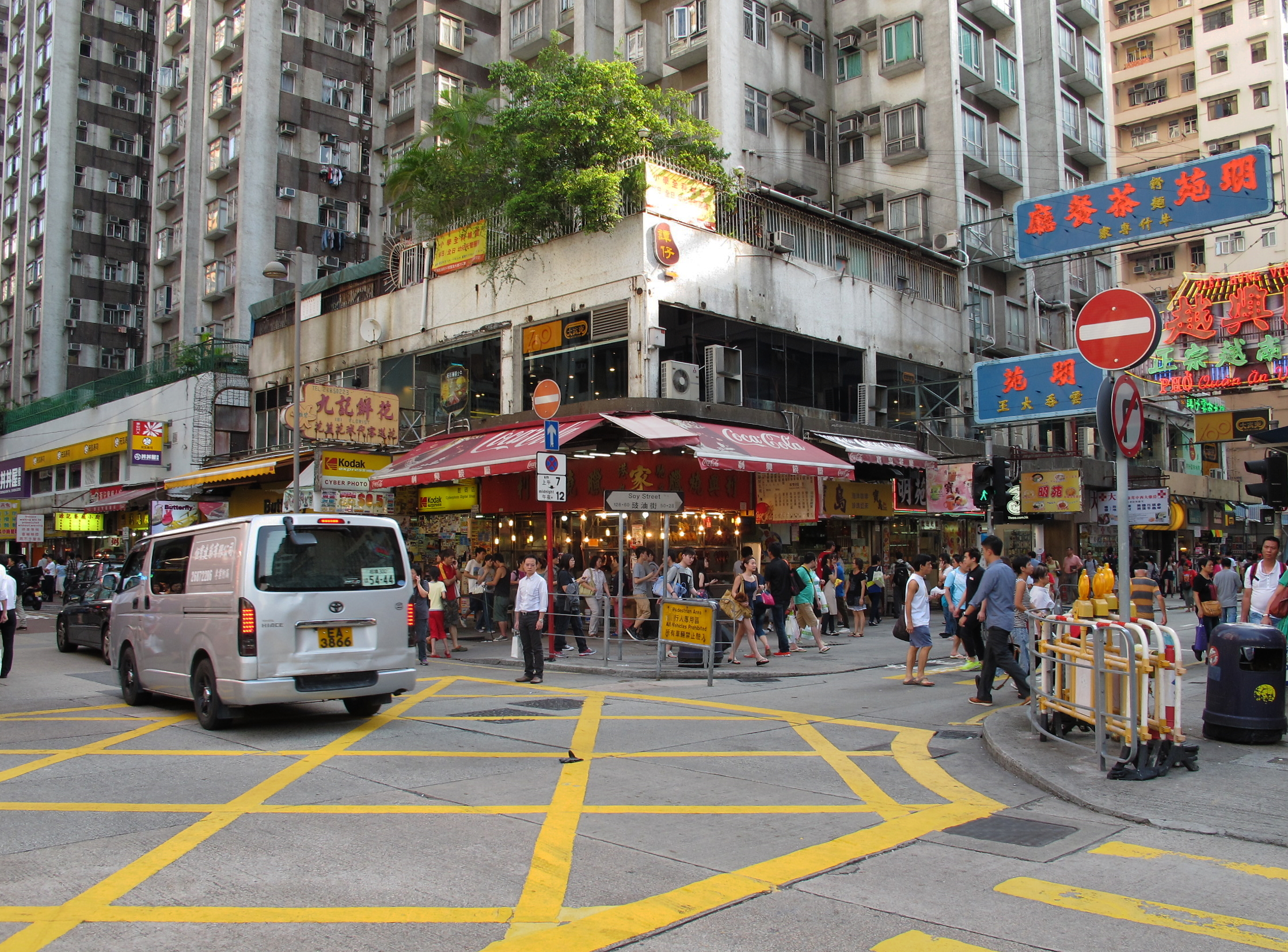
- Soy Street in July 2012
- Interactive map of Soy Street
- Native name: 豉油街 (Yue Chinese)
- Location: Kowloon, Hong Kong
- Coordinates: 22°18′58″N 114°10′02″E
- West end: Tak Cheong St
- East end: Yim Po Fong St

Soy Street
- Chinese: 豉油街
- Cantonese Yale: sih yàuh gāai
Transcriptions
Standard Mandarin
- Hanyu Pinyin: Chǐyóu Jiē
Yue: Cantonese
- Yale Romanization: sih yàuh gāai
- Jyutping: si6 jau4 gaai1

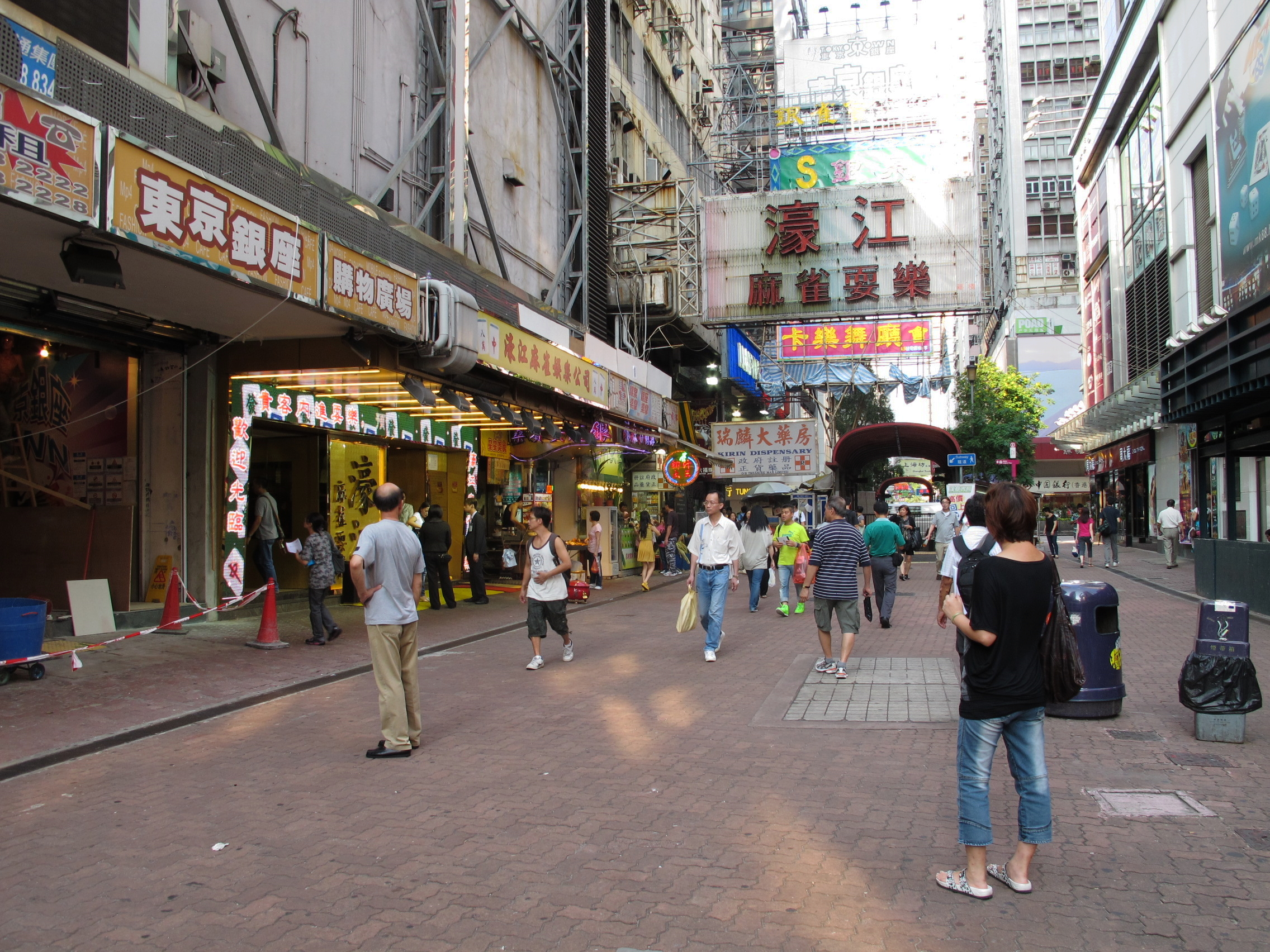
Temporary pedestrian zone in July 2012.

Soy Street (Chinese: 豉油街) is a street in Mong Kok, Kowloon, Hong Kong. It starts from Tak Cheong Street in the west, crosses several major streets including Nathan Road, and ends near Waterloo Road.

The section between Nathan Road and Sai Yeung Choi Street South is for pedestrians only. The section between Nathan Road and Fa Yuen Street becomes crowded with people during the holiday season and at night.

== History ==
The name Soy Street comes from a soya bean factory located in the area long ago. In June 2004, pottery from the Eastern Han dynasty (25–220 AD) and Jin dynasty (aka. Chin dynasty; 266–420 AD) were discovered at a construction site at the junction of Soy Street and Tung Choi Street.

== See also ==
- List of streets and roads in Hong Kong
