= Goldfish Street =

Street in Hong Kong

Coordinates: 22°19′23.5″N 114°10′11.17″E

- Chinese: 金魚街
- Cantonese Yale: gām yú gāai
- Literal meaning: goldfish street
Transcriptions
Yue: Cantonese
- Yale Romanization: gām yú gāai
- Jyutping: gam1 jyu4 gaai1

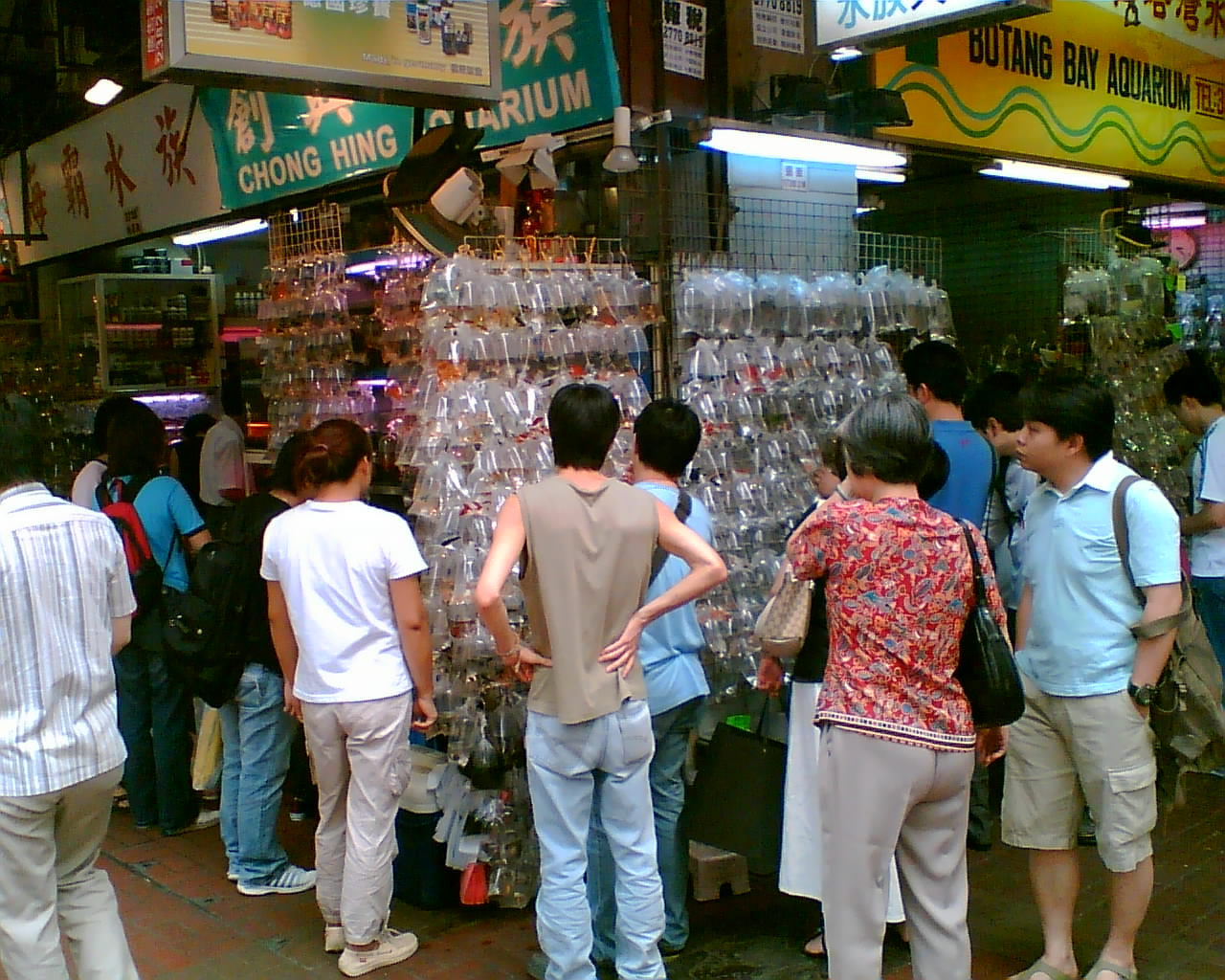
Goldfish Street

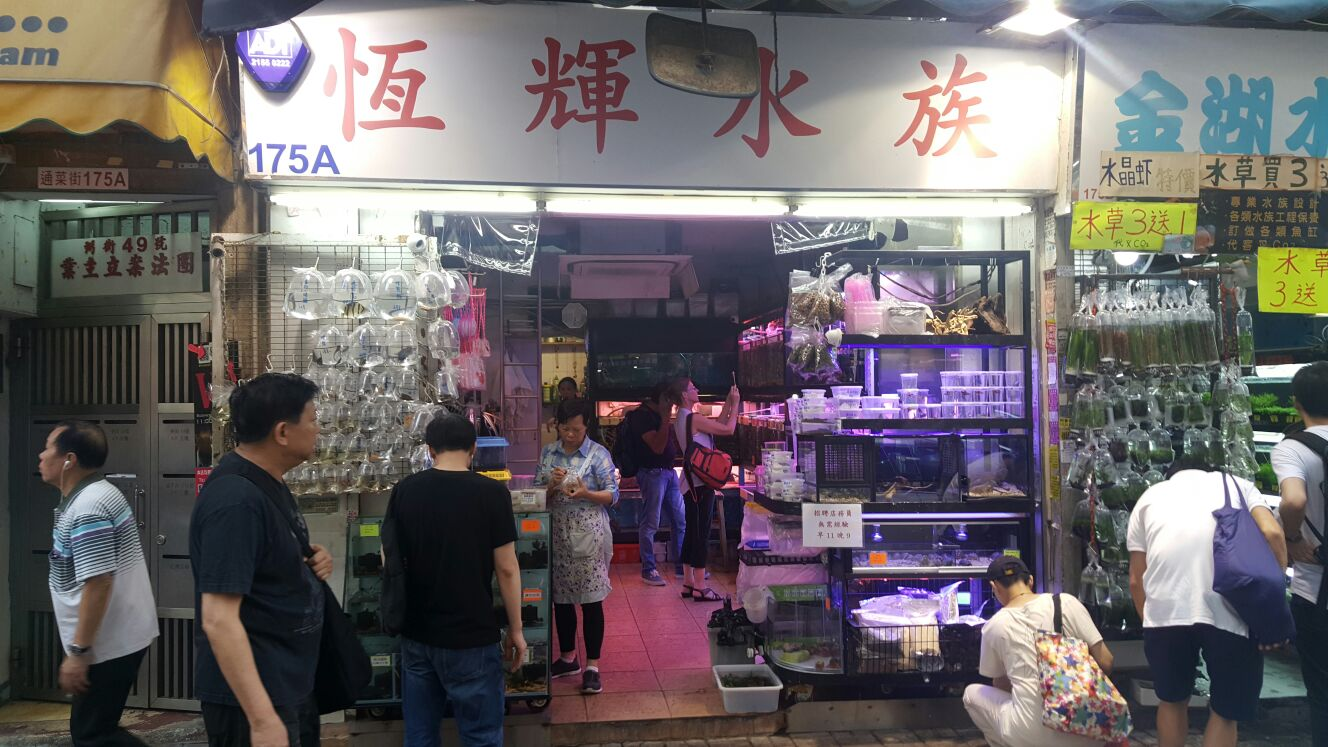
Goldfish Street

Goldfish Street (Chinese: 金魚街) or Goldfish Market - is a section of Tung Choi Street, north of Bute Street. There are numerous of shops selling tropical freshwater and marine fish, reptiles, vivariums etc. The shops open around 11 o'clock in the morning. There are also quite a few restaurants or street food vendors on this street.

There have been proposals to redevelop the area which may put the Goldfish market in jeopardy. There have also been reports about the sale of threatened or endangered species.

The market is located close to other local attractions, such as the Flower Market and the Bird Market.
