= Ho King Commercial Building =

Building in Hong Kong

Coordinates: 22.31585°N 114.17188°E

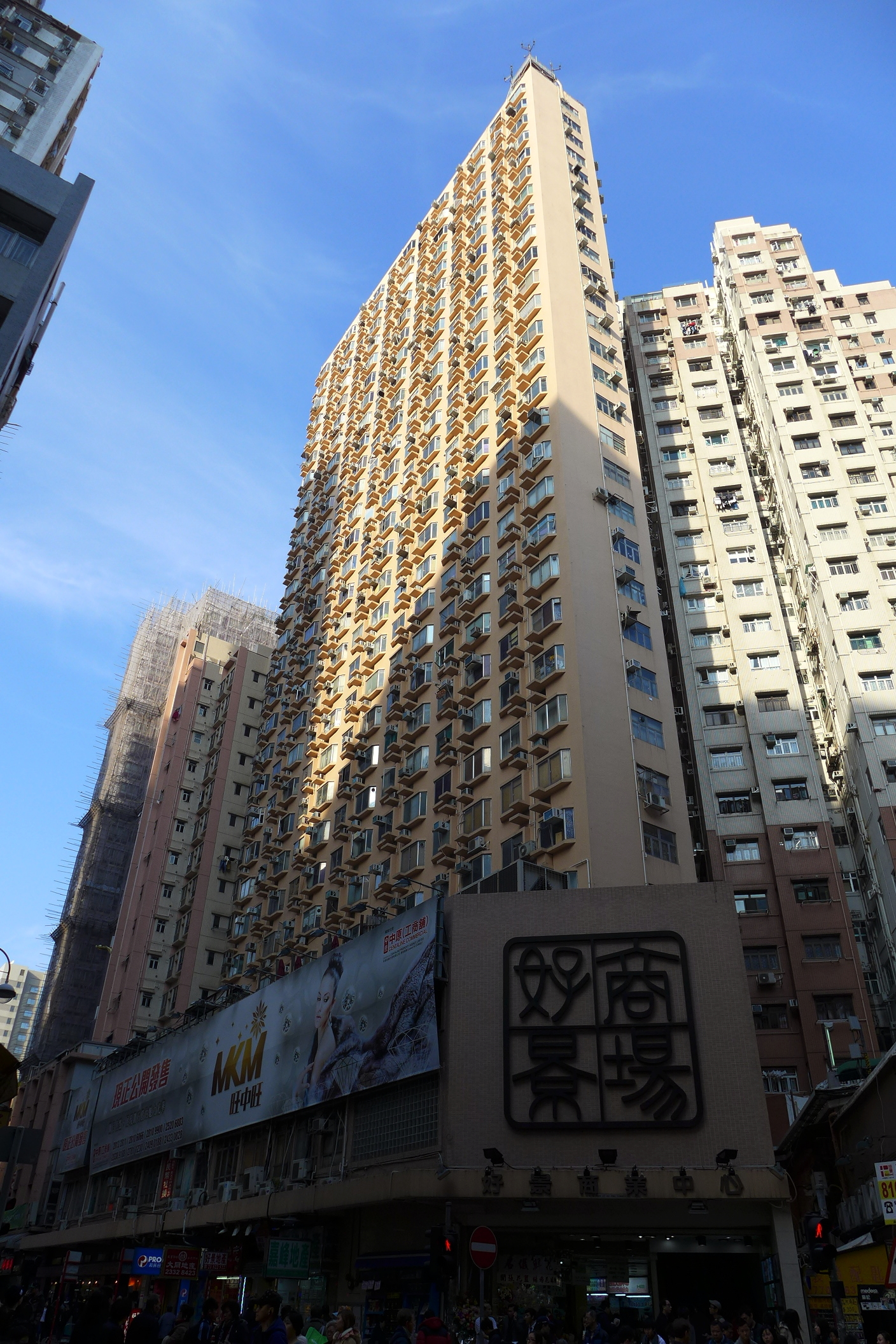
Ho King Commercial Building

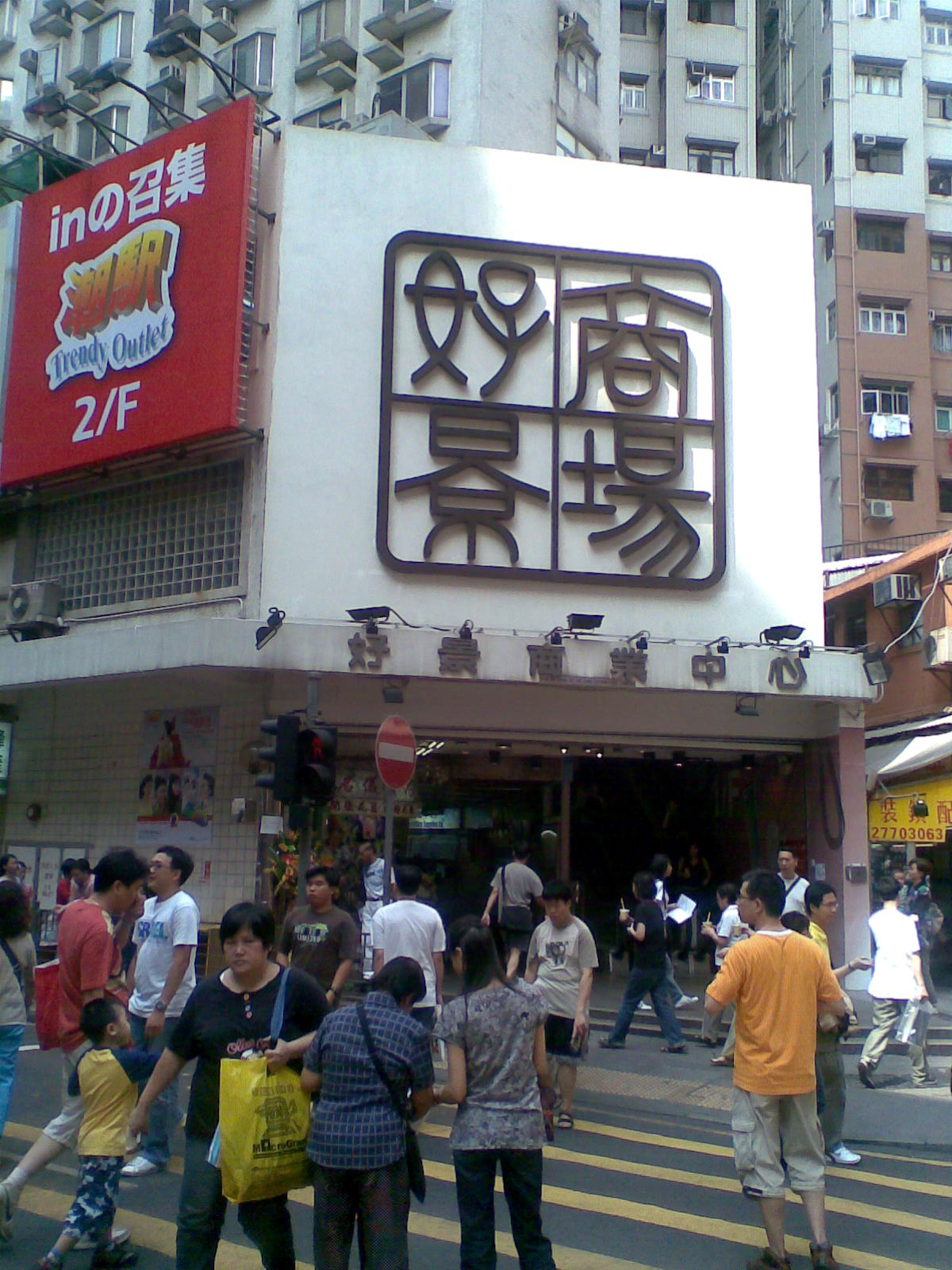
Ho King Shopping Centre

Ho King Commercial Building (Chinese: 好景商業中心; Jyutping: hou2 ging2 soeng1 jip6 zung1 sam1) and Ho King Shopping Centre (Chinese: 好景商場; Jyutping: hou2 ging2 soeng1 coeng4) are located at the junction of Fa Yuen Street and Dundas Street in Mong Kok, Hong Kong. Built in the 1980s, the lower levels of the shopping centre mainly sold video games and video game consoles in the early days. Gangsters later came in and began selling pornographic and unlicensed copies of VCDs that have made the shopping centre famous.

Slogans that their promoters yelled became alternative culture. The Hong Kong Government attempts to clear out merchants selling illegal goods frequently. In 2005, the 2nd floor was renovated as a pop culture market for youth.

== Transport ==
Yau Ma Tei station Exit A2
