= Hong Kong College of Engineering =

Coordinates: 22.31747°N 114.16960°E

The Hong Kong College of Engineering
- 香港設施工程學院
- Type: Private
- Established: 1992
- Vice-Chancellor: Mr. C M Kwan
- Students: More than 10,000 students since the college was established
- Location: Mong Kok, Kowloon, Hong Kong
- Website: www.tdpedu.org

Hong Kong College of Engineering
- Traditional Chinese: 香港設施工程學院
Transcriptions
Yue: Cantonese
- Yale Romanization: Hēung góng chit sī gūng chìhng hohk yuhn
- Jyutping: Hoeng1 gong2 cit3 si1 gung1 cing4 hok6 jyun6

The Hong Kong College of Engineering (HKCE) was established in 1992 and is a new conceptual college that focuses on providing training for the engineering industry.

It provides, by both local and distance learning, programmes leading to the award of a Professional Certificate, Diploma, Bachelor degree, Master's degree and ultimately Chartered Engineer. The college's core programmes include: Building Services Engineering, Facilities Management, Civil Engineering, Construction Management, Mechanical Engineering, Electrical and Electronic Engineering and Data Center.

It currently has collaborated with BTEC and Heriot-Watt University, both of which are in the United Kingdom to provide link-up programmes for its students.

HKCE's predecessor was first established in 1992 as a small team of lecturers providing tuition for the Hong Kong Productivity Council, The University of Hong Kong, Hong Kong Polytechnic University, Hong Kong Baptist University, American Hotel and Motel Association and The Association of Chief Engineers (Hong Kong Institute of Chief Engineers / HKICE), etc.

The mission of this college is to provide both professional and practical training. More than 10,000 students have attended their courses since the college was established.

== Accreditation and partnerships ==
Most of the courses provided by the HKCE are accredited and recognized by the following institutions and organizations.

- Heriot-Watt University (UK)
- City & Guilds (UK)
- Edexcel / BTEC (UK)
- CNet Training (UK)
- Hong Kong Institution of Chief Engineers (HK)
- Various universities in UK and USA

All BSc / MSc courses are also registered with the Non-local Higher Register of the Hong Kong Education Department (with EMB course registration number).

All HD (Higher Diploma) / HND (Higher national Diploma) holders are eligible to apply senior-year entry of degree programme in The Hong Kong Polytechnic University, the Hong Kong University of Science and Technology and The University of Hong Kong.

== Authorized approval support centre ==
As a result of the college's provision of educational, professional and practical courses, the college has been awarded as the status of Approval Support Centre by the following recognized organizations:

- Heriot-Watt University (HWU)
- Edexcel International (BTEC/Edexcel)
- City & Guilds
- CNet Training
- HK Institution of Chief Engineers (F&M) Ltd (HKICE)
- Trent Global Education Group

== Seminar and professional training ==
Whilst providing a range of programmes, the HKCE currently organizes some practical training courses and seminars with other co-operations and government departments, they include Electrical and Mechanical Services Department (EMSD), HK Hospital Authority and HK Property Management Institute. Training is in the following areas:

- Fire Services Engineering
- Plumbing & Drainage
- Civil Engineering
- Facilities Management
- Building Maintenance

== Advanced qualifications ==
The HKCE encourage people to further study. Even if the students is a degree and master holder in engineering, becoming a Chartered Engineer will be the most favourable choice. The HKCE provides an intensive preparation courses for following qualification.

- Professional Engineer (RPE) in Hong Kong
- Chartered Engineer (CEng) in United Kingdom
