= Mong Kok =

Neighbourhood in Hong Kong

Coordinates: 22°19′21″N 114°10′14″E

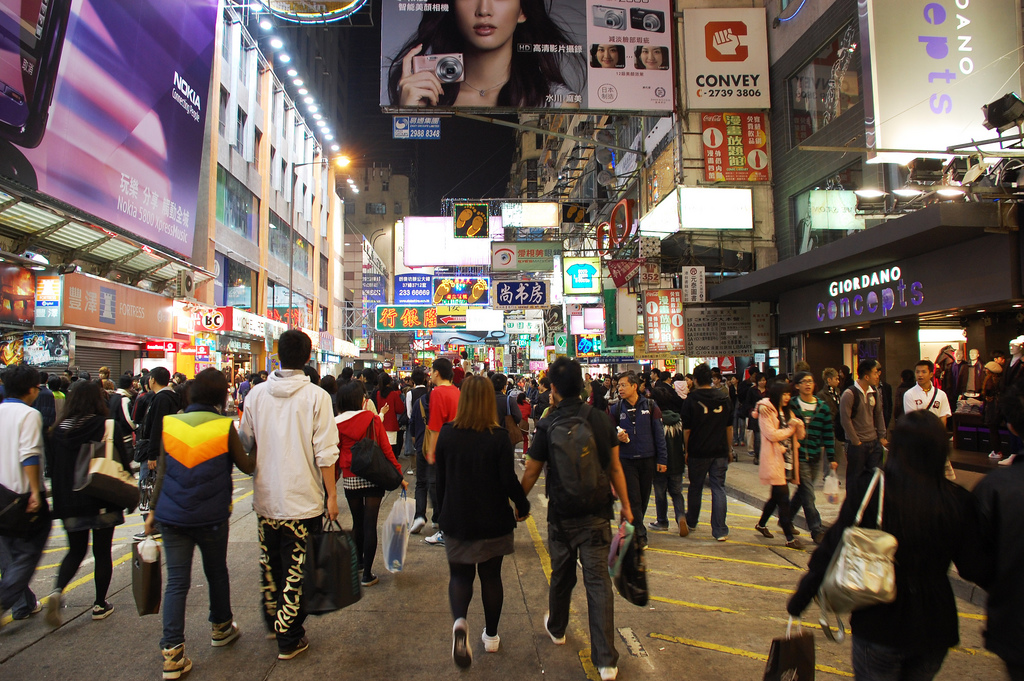
- Sai Yeung Choi Street South in Mong Kok
- Chinese: 旺角
- Literal meaning: flourishing/busy corner
Transcriptions
Standard Mandarin
- Hanyu Pinyin: Wàngjiǎo
- Wade–Giles: wang4 chiao3
Hakka
- Romanization: vong4 gok5
Yue: Cantonese
- Yale Romanization: Wohng Gok
- Jyutping: Wong6 Gok3
- IPA: [wɔ̀ːŋ kɔ̄ːk]

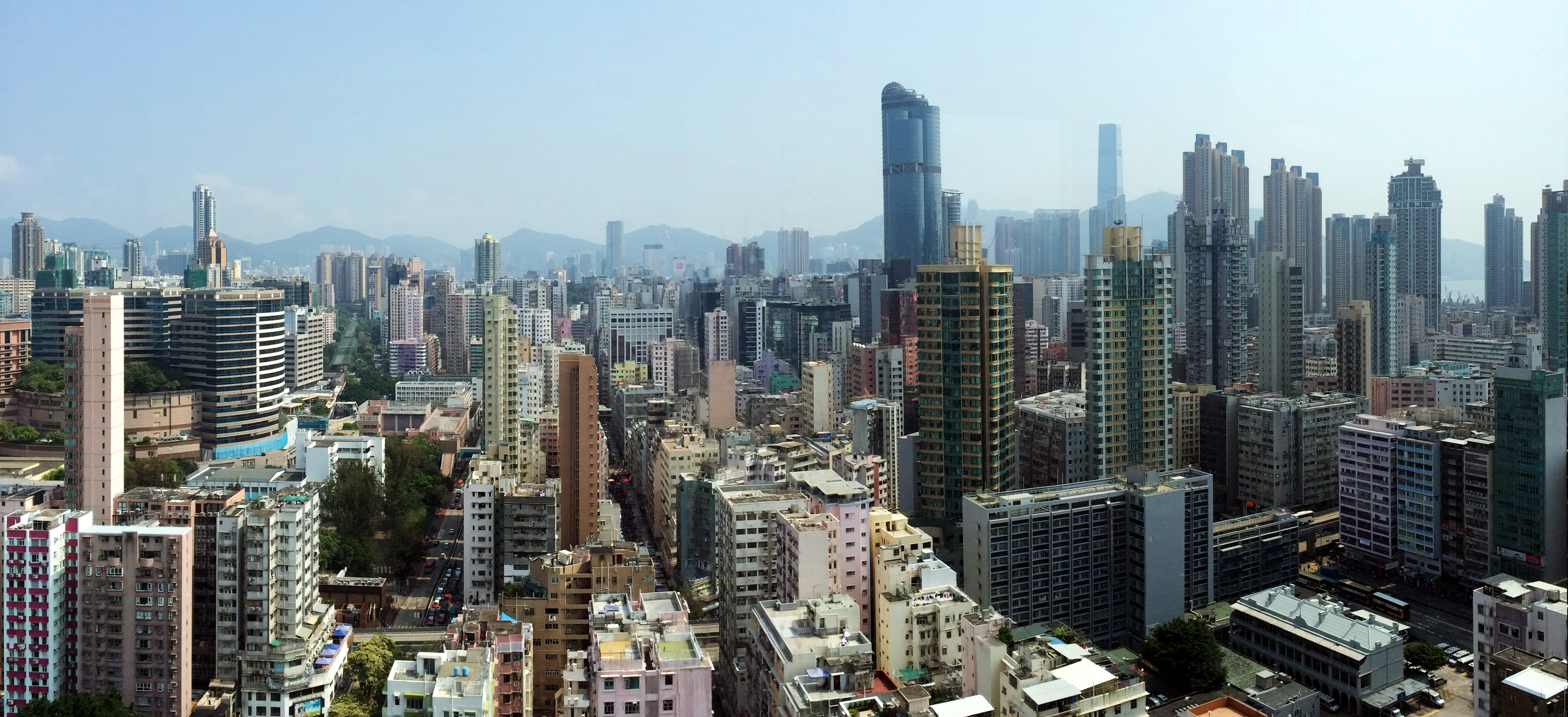
Aerial view of Mong Kok

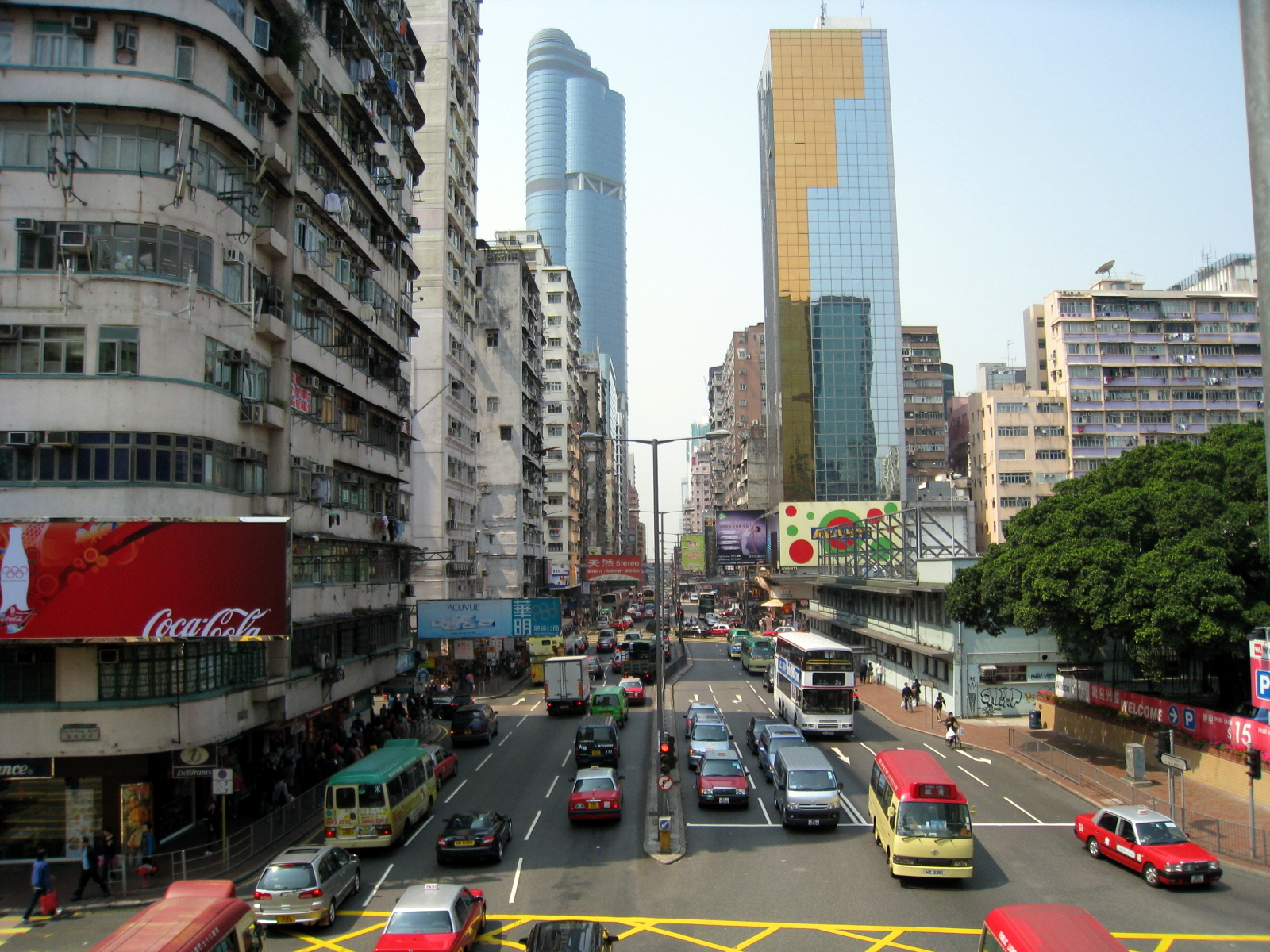
Argyle Street in Mong Kok

Mong Kok (Chinese: 旺角; Jyutping: wong6 gok3), also spelled Mongkok, often abbreviated as MK, is an area in Kowloon, Hong Kong. The Prince Edward subarea occupies the northern part of Mong Kok.

As one of the major shopping areas in Hong Kong, Mong Kok is characterised by a mixture of old and new multi-story buildings, with shops and restaurants at street level, and commercial or residential units above. Major industries in Mong Kok are retail, restaurants (including fast food) and entertainment. It has been described and portrayed in films as an area in which triads run bars, nightclubs, and massage parlours. With its extremely high population density of 130,000/km^{2} (340,000/sq mi), Mong Kok was described as the busiest district in the world by the Guinness World Records.

== Name ==
Until 1930, the area was called Mong Kok Tsui (芒角嘴). The current English name is a transliteration of its older Chinese name 望角 (Jyutping: mong^{6} gok^{3}; IPA: [mɔːŋ˨ kɔːk˧]), or 芒角 (Jyutping: mong^{4} gok^{3}; IPA: [mɔːŋ˨˩ kɔːk˧]), which is named for its plentiful supply of ferns in the past when it was a coastal region. Its present Chinese name, "旺角" (Jyutping: wong^{6} gok^{3}; IPA: [wɔːŋ˨ kɔːk˧]), means "prosperous corner" or "crowded corner"; however, the English name did not change.

For a period, the area was also called Argyle (Argyle Street is a thoroughfare in the area), and this name was used for the MTR station when it opened in 1979. The office building Mong Kok Centre, which was named after the area, is known in English as Argyle Centre.

== Administration ==
Mong Kok is part of Yau Tsim Mong District. It was part of the Mong Kok District before the district was merged in 1994. The area belongs to the Kowloon West geographical constituency of the Legislative Council of Hong Kong.

== History ==
Displays at the Chinese University of Hong Kong include antique potteries indicating that there might have been settlements in the area as early as the western Han dynasty (206 BC to AD 8 ) to Jin Dynasty (266–420).

The area used to be a Hakka settlement, with about 200 villagers according to Bao'an records in 1819.

The heart of the present-day Mong Kok is along Argyle Street near Sai Yeung Choi Street whilst the proper Mong Kok used to be to the north, near the present-day Mong Kok East station. Mong Kok was an area of cultivated lands, bounded to the south by Argyle Street, to the west by Coronation Road (a section of present-day Nathan Road), and to the east by hills. To the southeast of Mong Kok is Ho Man Tin and to the west Tai Kok Tsui.

On 10 August 2008, the Cornwall Court fire broke out. More than 200 firefighters were involved in the rescue operation. Four people died, including two firefighters.

Mong Kok received a lot of negative media attention for many acid attacks on Sai Yeung Choi Street from December 2008 through January 2010.

The area was the site of protracted demonstrations during the 2014 Hong Kong protests, including the gau wu campaign, and was also the site of the 2016 Mong Kok civil unrest.

== Streets and markets ==
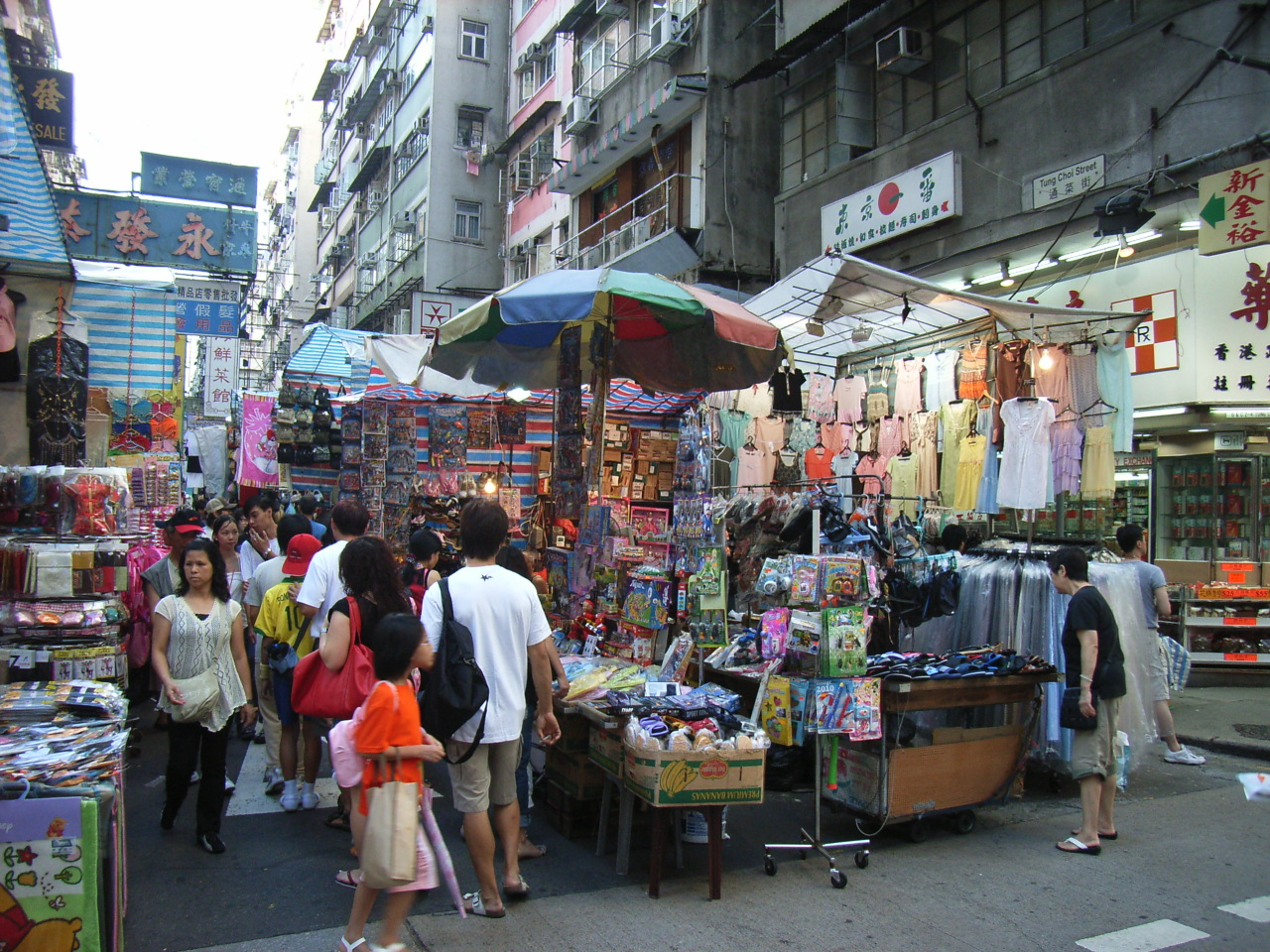
Ladies' Market

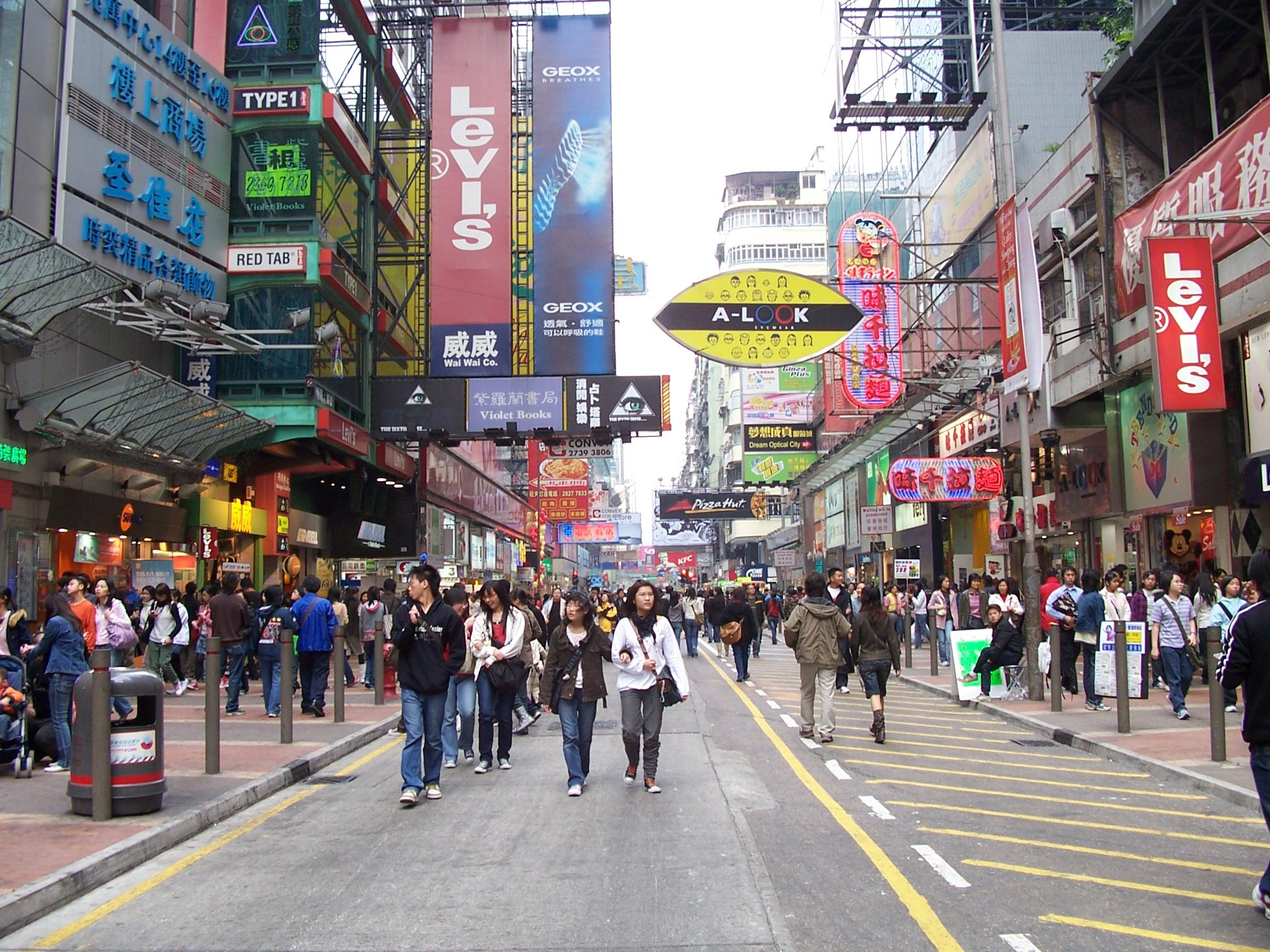
Sai Yeung Choi Street South

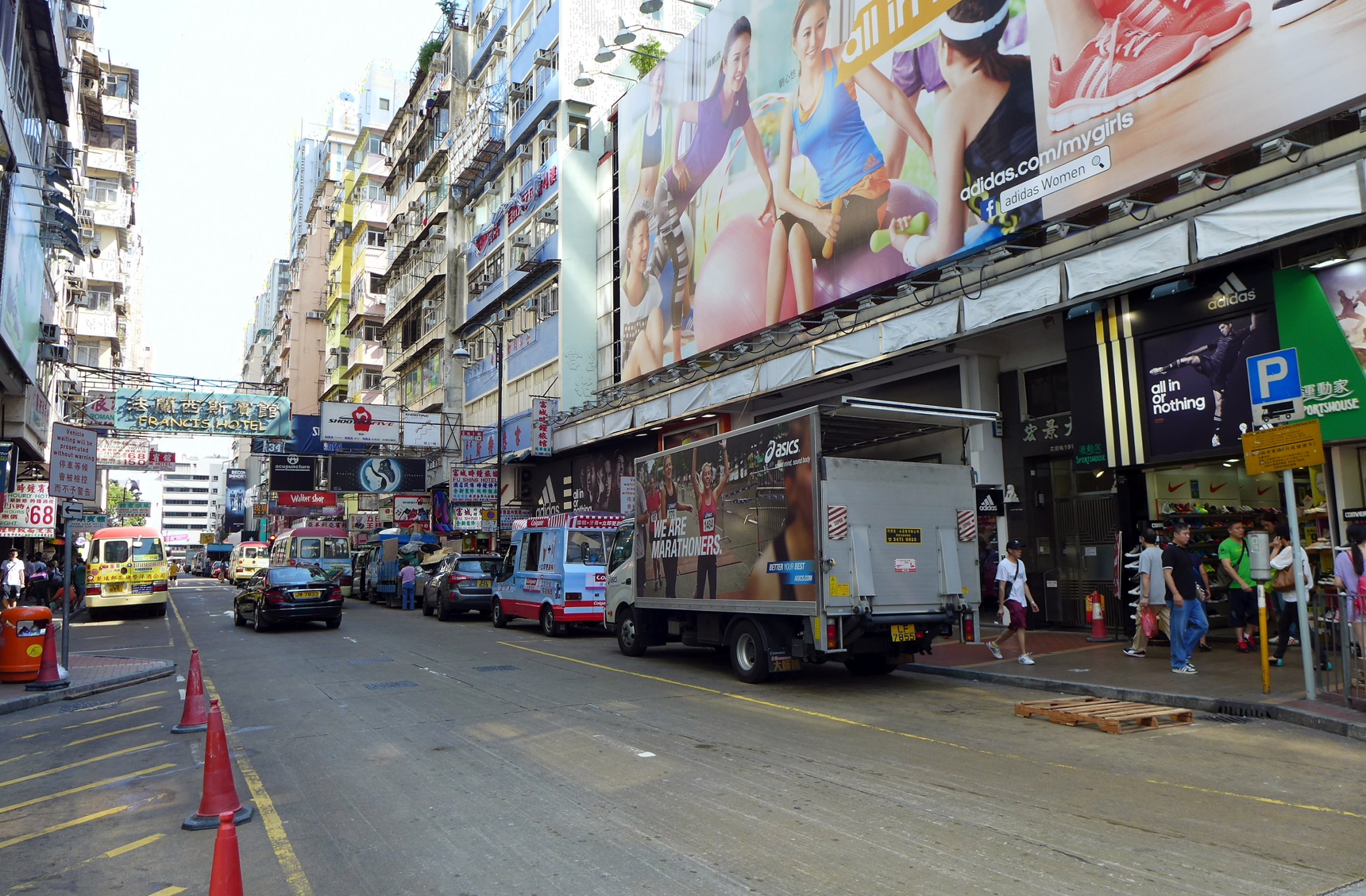
Fa Yuen Street

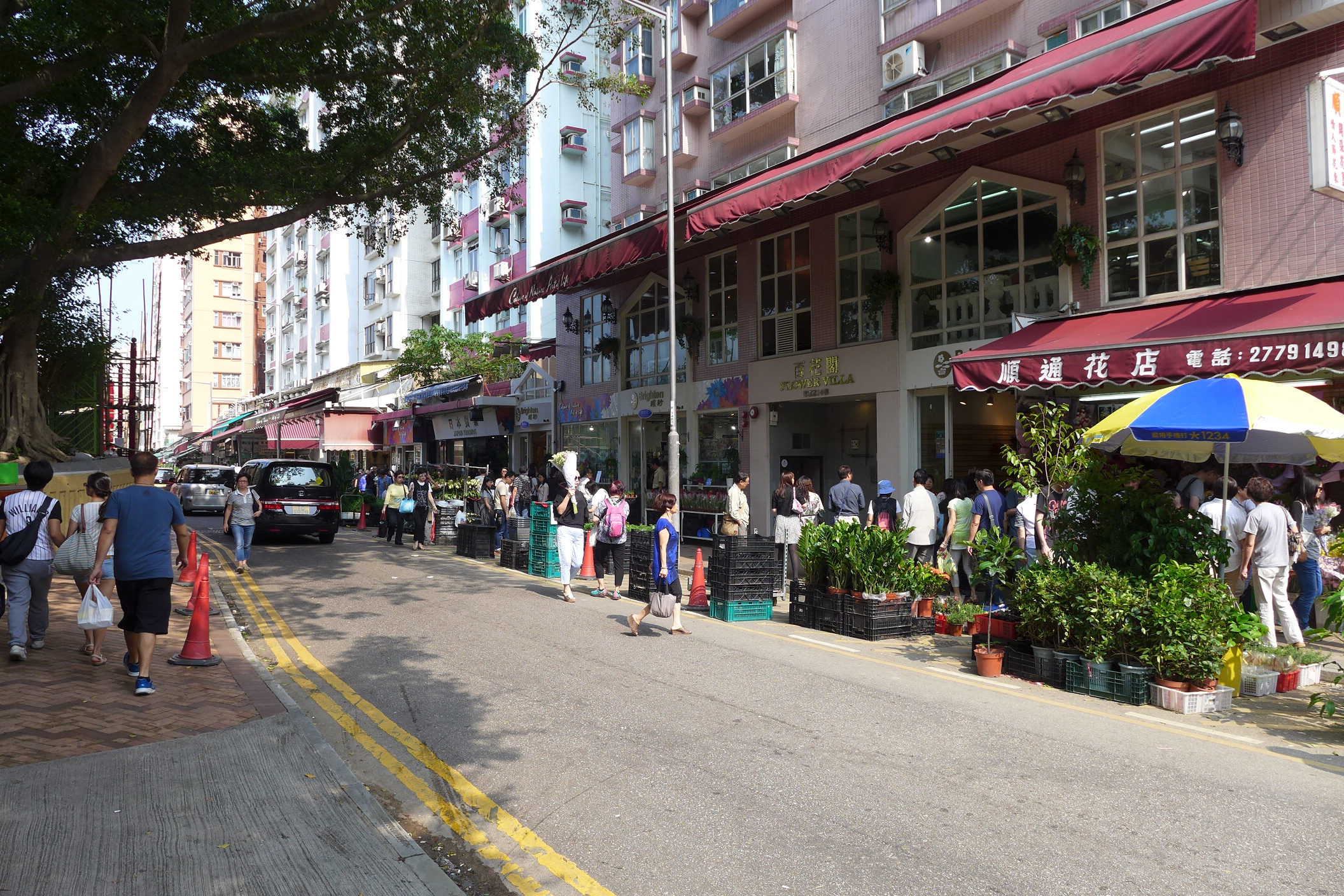
Flower Market Road

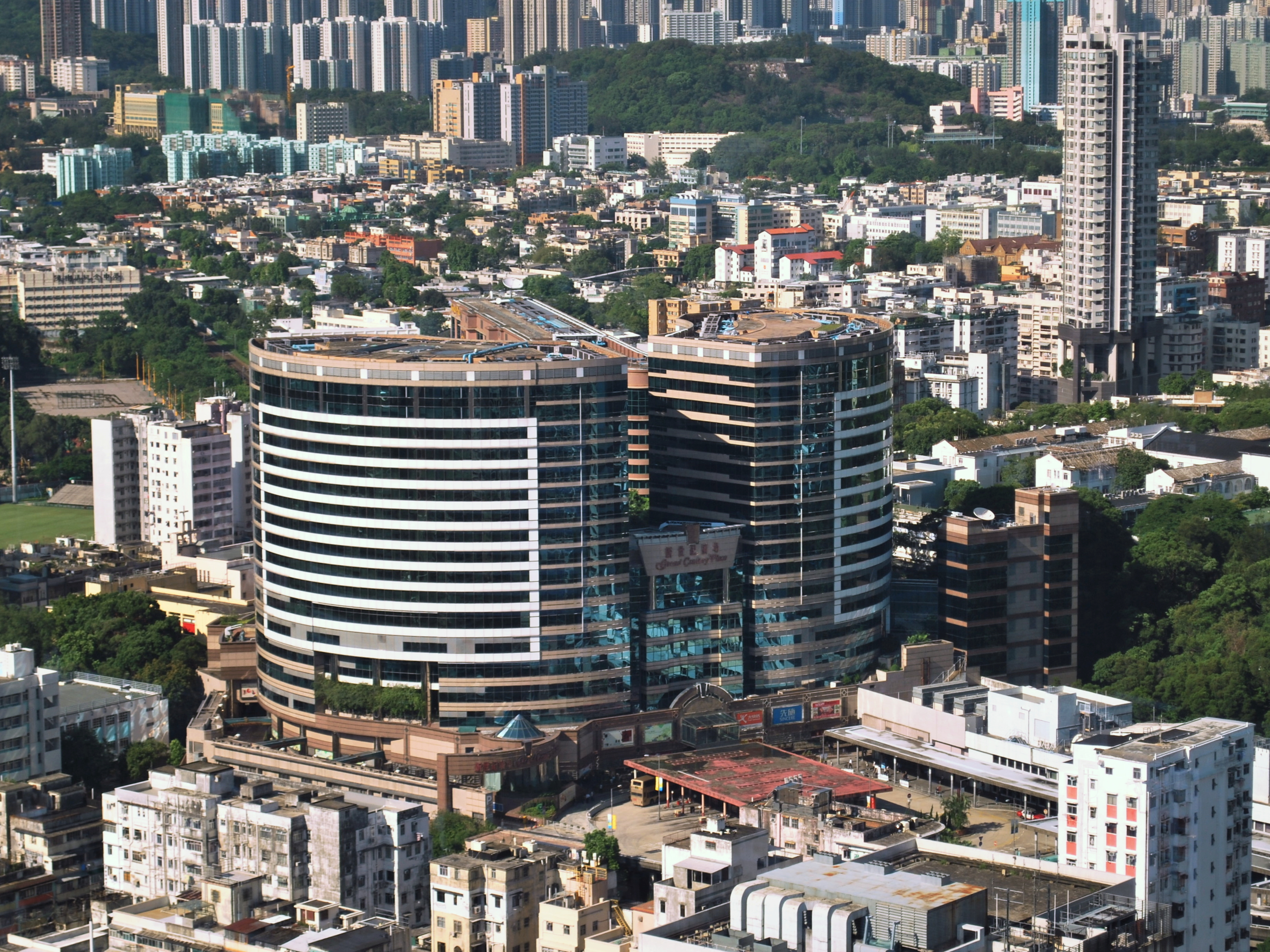
Grand Century Place. Mong Kok East station is visible at the bottom left. The area in the background is part of Kowloon City District.

Mong Kok preserves its traditional characteristics with an array of markets, small shops, and food stalls that have disappeared from other areas during the past several decades of economic developments and urban transformation. As such, a few of these streets in Mong Kok have acquired nicknames reflecting their own characteristics. Some interesting sites are:

- Tung Choi Street (通菜街) (also known as 女人街, Ladies' Market) – This market specialises in women's clothing, accessories, and cosmetics, and is open daily from noon to midnight.
- Sai Yeung Choi Street South (西洋菜南街) – A street full of shops selling consumer electronic products, cosmetics, and discount books. The latter are usually located on the lower floors of buildings.
- Yuen Po Street Bird Garden (園圃街雀鳥花園) – Hundreds of songbirds in exquisitely crafted cages can be seen at this market. The garden is open from 10 a.m. to 6 p.m. and is located near Mong Kok Stadium, to the north of Mong Kok East station and east of Prince Edward station.
  The garden was completed in 1997 for the relocation of booths selling birds at Hong Lok Street (雀仔街), aka. "Bird Street", which was closed due to urban renewal in June 1998.
- Fa Yuen Street (花園街) (also known as 波鞋街; 'Sneakers Street') – This is a small neighbourhood of small retailers selling sports equipment and clothing. The shops stock a diversity of sports shoes, including many shoes of rare or special editions from different places.
- Flower Market Road (花墟道) – The street and the nearby side streets are packed with florists and street vendors selling flowers and plants. At the end of the street is Yuen Po Street Bird Garden.
- Goldfish Street (金魚街) or Goldfish Market – Centered on a section of Tung Choi Street, north of Bute Street. There are dozens of shops selling tropical freshwater and marine fish, aquariums and accessories. This market opens very early in the morning.
- Tile Street (瓷磚街) – This is a section of Portland Street near Argyle Street and Bute Street with more than 50 retailers selling materials for construction or renovation, such as tiles, wall paper, window frames and bath tubs.
- Photocopy Street (影印街) – A neighbourhood near Yim Po Fong Street and Soy Street is noted for its remarkable number of photocopying shops due to the number of schools in the vicinity. The shops also have ID photo taking service.
- Portland Street (砵蘭街) – A red-light district featuring numerous shops and restaurants.
- Kwong Wa Street (廣華街), between Dundas Street and Yim Po Fong Street, is famous for shops selling airsoft, RC racing, modelling and other hobbying equipment.
- Dundas Street (登打士街) marks the southern end of the shopping area in eastern Mong Kok, where Sai Yeung Choi Street South, Tung Choi Street and Fa Yuen Street terminate. It is named for Henry Dundas, 1st Viscount Melville, former British Home Secretary and Secretary of State for War. It is unclear why the street was bestowed in his honour although, as a former British colony, many of Hong Kong's streets and institutions were named in memory of prominent English historic and political figures. Ho King Shopping Centre and Trendy Zone are major shopping centres on the street. Various kinds of snack food shops concentrate on this street. Kwong Wah Hospital is also situated on the street. Across Nathan Road, the section in the western Mong Kok is relatively quiet and there are many cafés above street level in several buildings.

Some popular shopping plazas located in this dense area include:

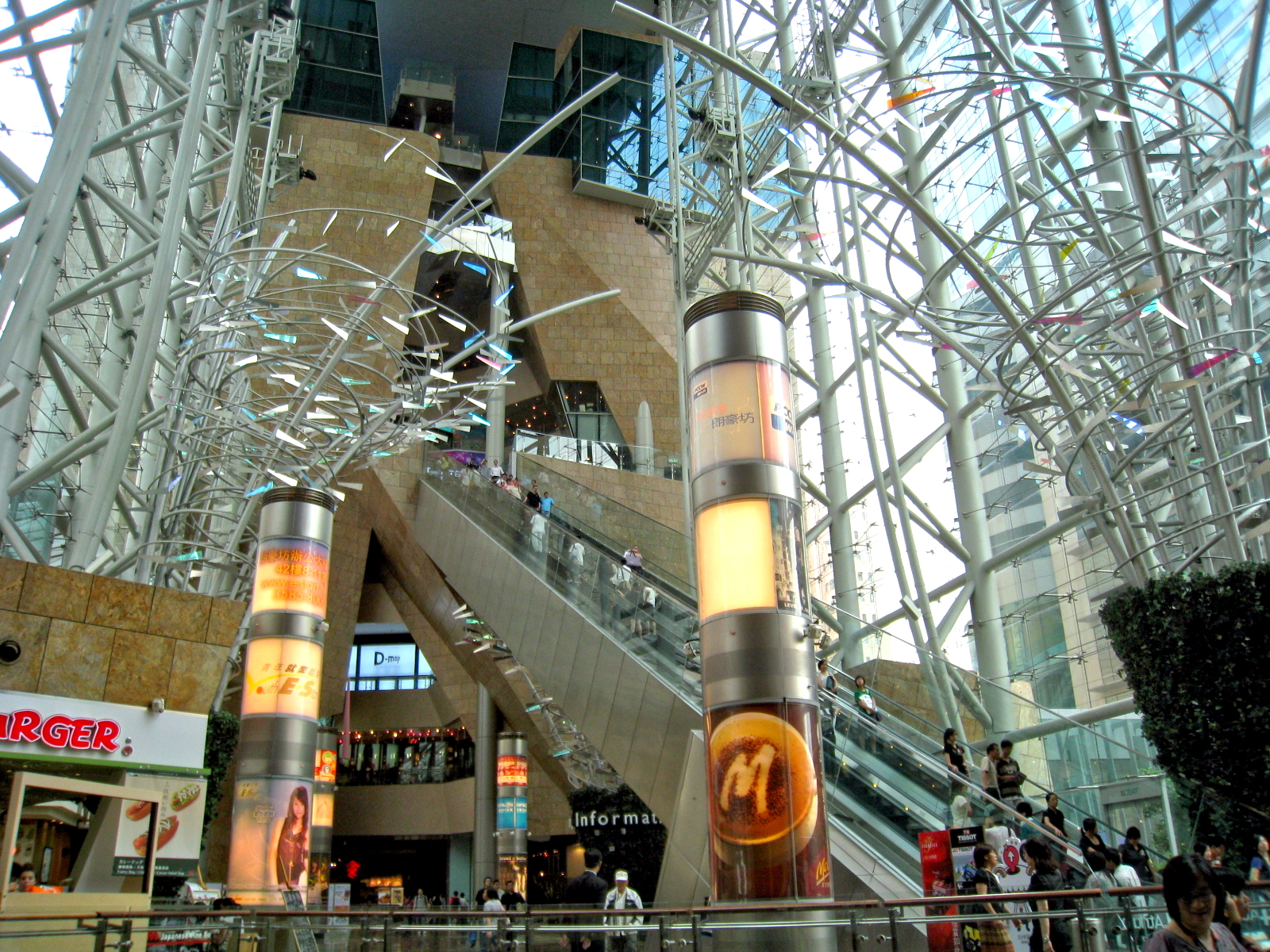
Langham Place, 4th floor

- T.O.P (This is Our Place) – Latest fashionable shopping centre for youngers. No high-end shops there but specially characteristic store. An overpass corridor connected to Argyle Centre (旺角中心).
- Sim City (星際城市) – There are shops selling first or second hand cameras and lens, photographic and videographic equipment, gadget, phone accessory, computer accessory.
- Sino Centre (信和中心) – Most shops sell Japanimation figures and merchandising. Other shops sell comic books, VCDs and DVDs related to Japanese cartoons, and regular CD albums.
- Ho King Shopping Centre (好景商場) – Visitors can find computer and video games sold for relatively low prices. The fourth floor of the plaza is infamous for being formerly the biggest base of pornographic CDs and DVDs, and activities have diminished due to police and customs operations. However, some shops have been driven to the office section of the building.
- Grand Century Place (新世紀廣場) – Situated next to Mong Kok East station, visitors can find famous-brand and popular shops.
- Mong Kok Computer Centre (旺角電腦中心) – This three-story computer mall has around 50 to 70 computer shops, selling laptops, software, hardware and computer accessories.
- Langham Place (朗豪坊) – This is a 59-storey complex with a huge shopping mall, a hotel, and offices. It opened in 2004 and was constructed based on the Hong Kong Government urban redevelopment scheme. It is the tallest building in Mong Kok.
- Argyle Centre (旺角中心) – This usually crowded centre, located next to Mong Kok Station, has three floors of shops selling female low-priced clothes and shoes. Also a lot of snack food and drinks shop there.
- Trendy Zone (潮流特區)
- W Plaza (W 商場)
- Hollywood Shopping Centre (荷李活購物中心)
- Sincere Podium (先達中心)
- Richmond Shopping Arcade (皆旺商場)
- Hollywood Plaza (荷李活商業中心)
- CTMA Centre (兆萬中心)

Other streets in the area include:

- Bute Street (弼街), named after John Stuart, 3rd Earl of Bute, Prime Minister of the United Kingdom between 1762 and 1763. It may also have been named after the Scottish peerage of the same name, following the naming pattern of several other streets in the area.
- Fife Street (快富街) is a street that is north of Argyle Street, south of Mong Kok Road, and perpendicular to Nathan Road. The Chinese name means "fast wealth" in English, but the name is a loanword based on the English pronunciation of the fife instrument.
- Soy Street (豉油街)

== Food ==
The Mong Kok area has many food-booths selling traditional snacks such as fish balls, fried beancurd (tofu) and various dim sum. These fingerfoods are very popular in Hong Kong, especially for people on the run. In addition, there are restaurants serving different kinds of cuisine, ranging from Japanese to Thai and Italian.

== Built heritage ==
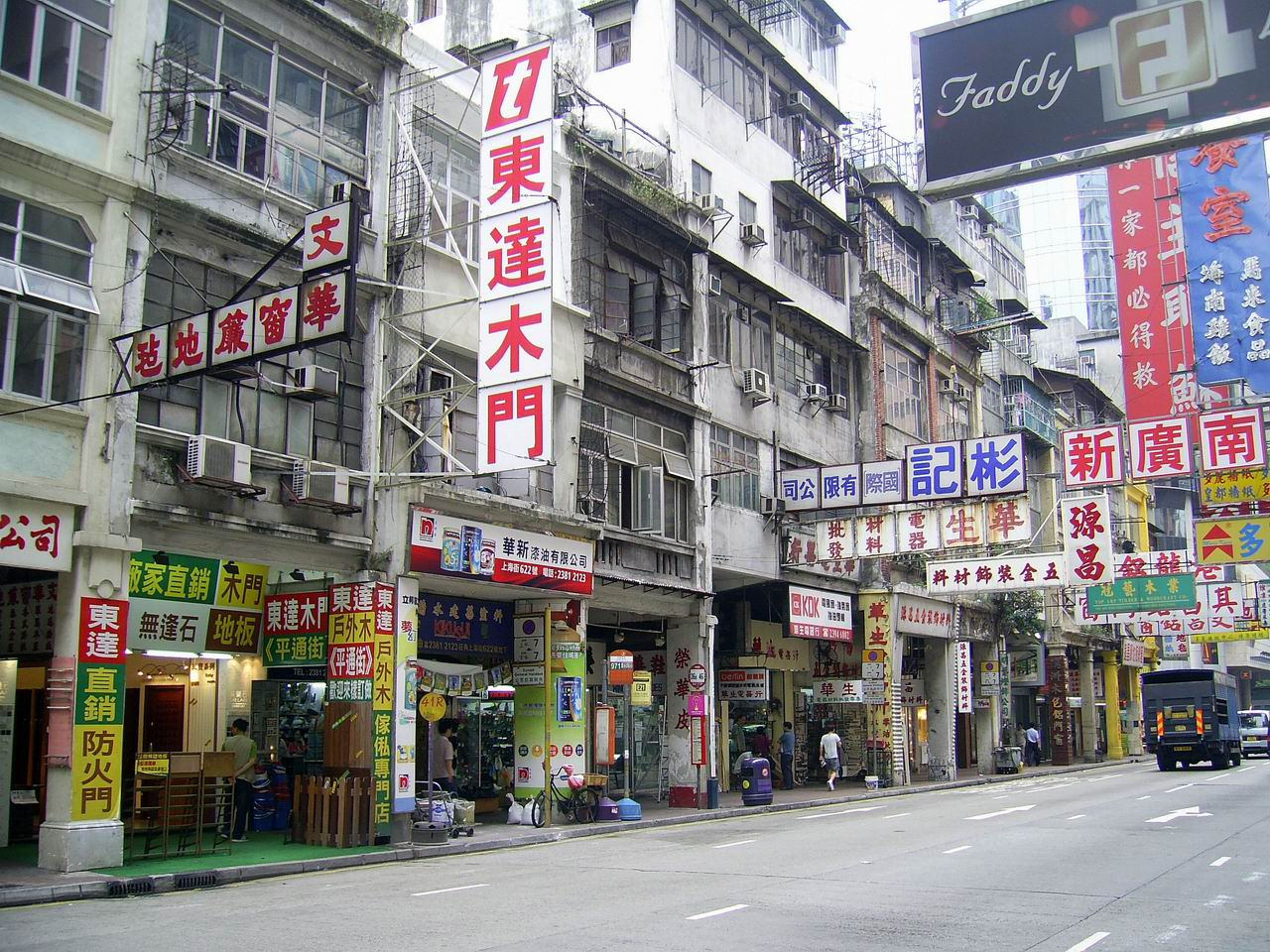
Nos. 600–626 Shanghai Street

Built heritage in Mong Kok includes:

- Several tong-lau, including Nos. 600–626 Shanghai Street and Lui Seng Chun on Lai Chi Kok Road. Both are listed as Grade I historic buildings.
- Old Kowloon Police Headquarters, built in 1925. Grade II historic building and one of the historic police station buildings in Hong Kong. Now part of the Mong Kok Police Station.
- Shui Yuet Temple (水月宮), located at No. 90 Shantung Street. Built in 1927, it is dedicated to Guanyin. Grade III.
- All Saints' Church, No. 2 Yim Po Fong Street
- Parts of Kowloon Hospital

== Sport venues ==
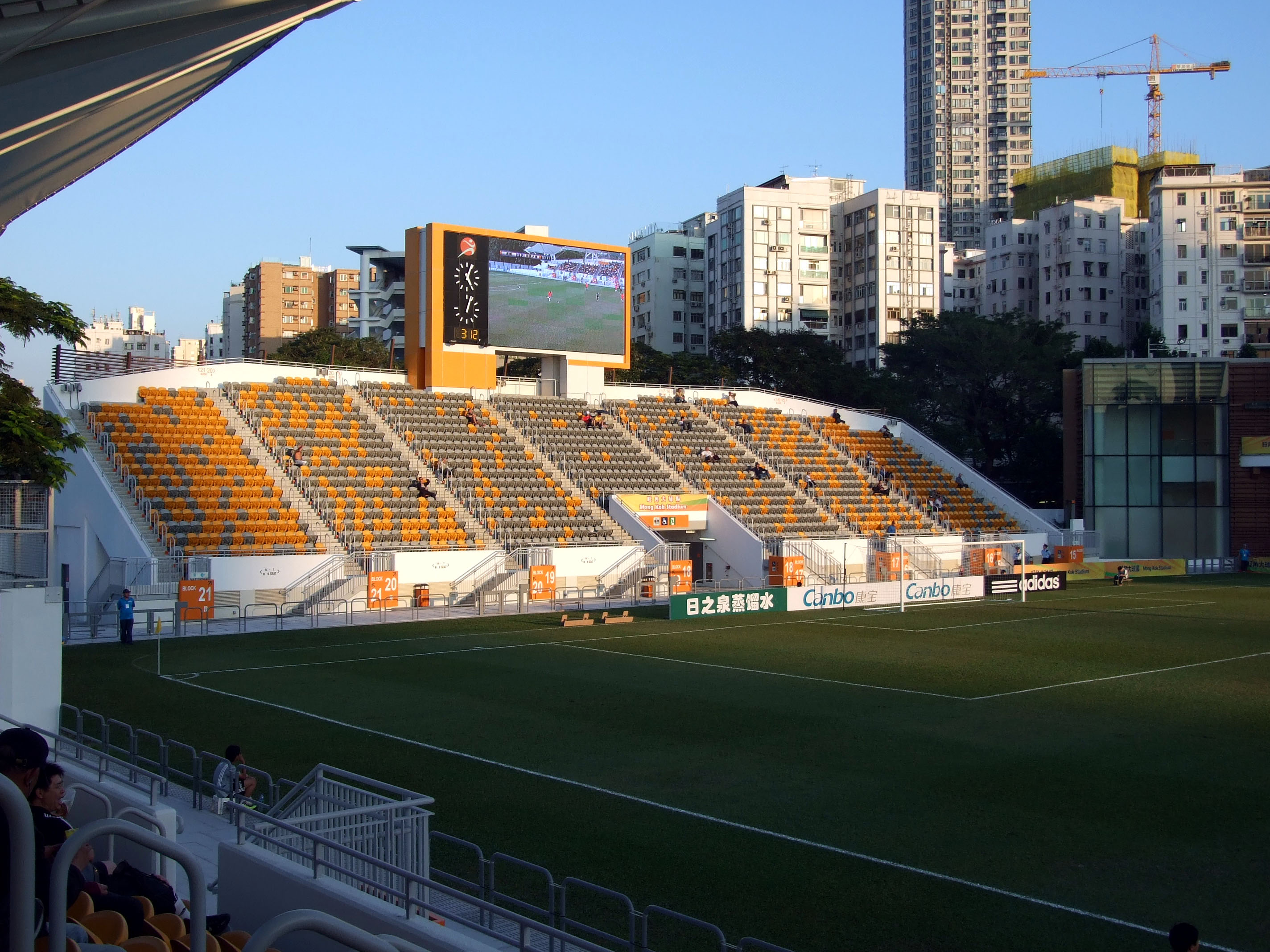
Mong Kok Stadium in 2011, after renovation

- Macpherson Stadium
- Macpherson Playground
- Mong Kok Stadium: home to Citizen AA and Sun Hei SC
- Boundary Street Sports Centre

== Education ==
Educational institutions in Mong Kok include:

- Chinese University of Hong Kong campus in Shantung Street
- Diocesan Boys' School
- Hong Kong & Kowloon Chiu Chow Public Association Secondary School
- Hong Kong College of Engineering
- Queen Elizabeth School
- Sheng Kung Hui All Saints' Middle School

Mong Kok is in Primary One Admission (POA) School Net 32. Within the school net are multiple aided schools (operated independently but funded with government money) and Tong Mei Road Government Primary School (塘尾道官立小學).

Hong Kong Public Libraries operates Fa Yuen Street Public Library in the Fa Yuen Street Municipal Services Building in Mong Kok.

== Transport ==
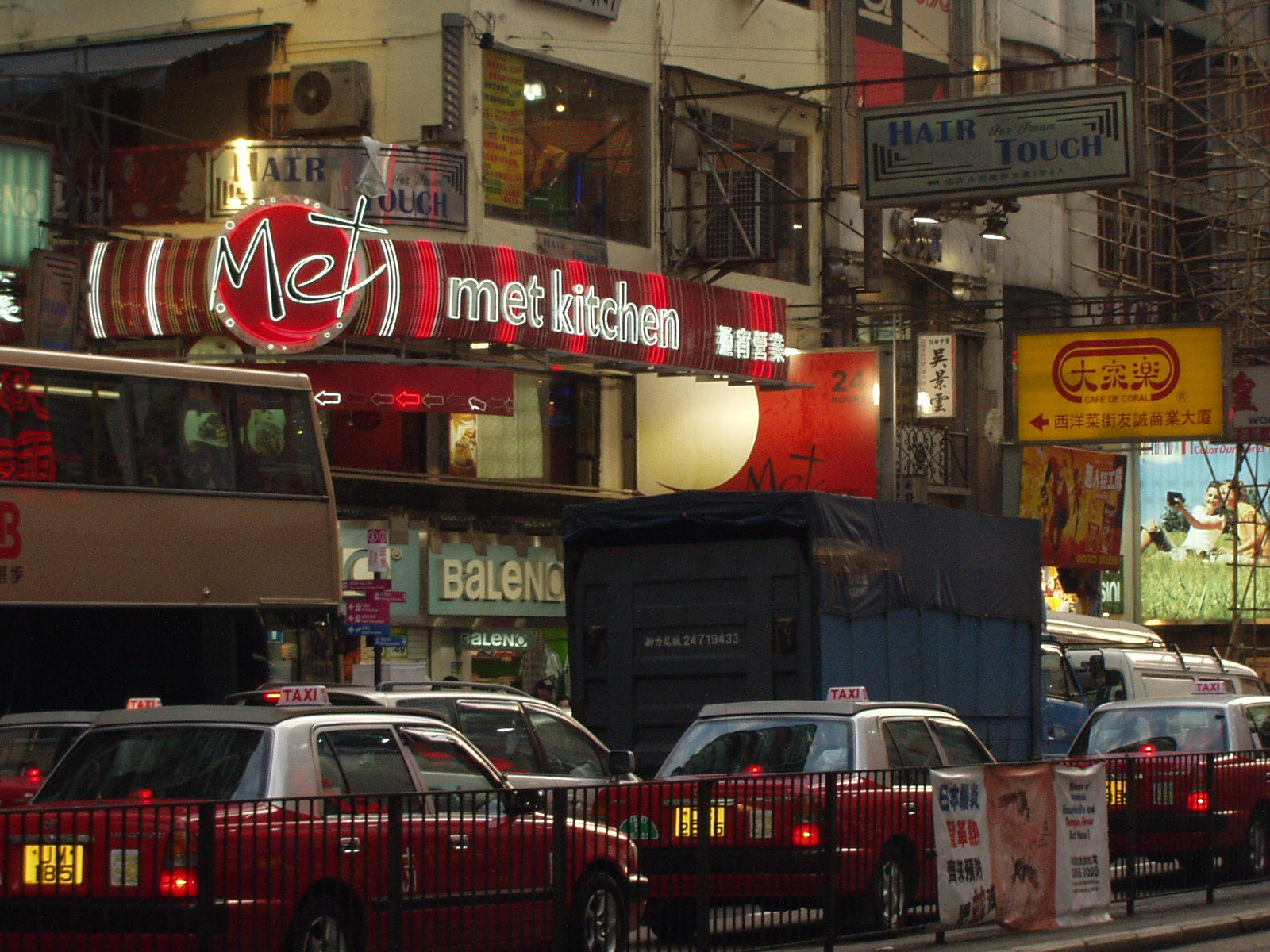
Traffic congestion in Mong Kok

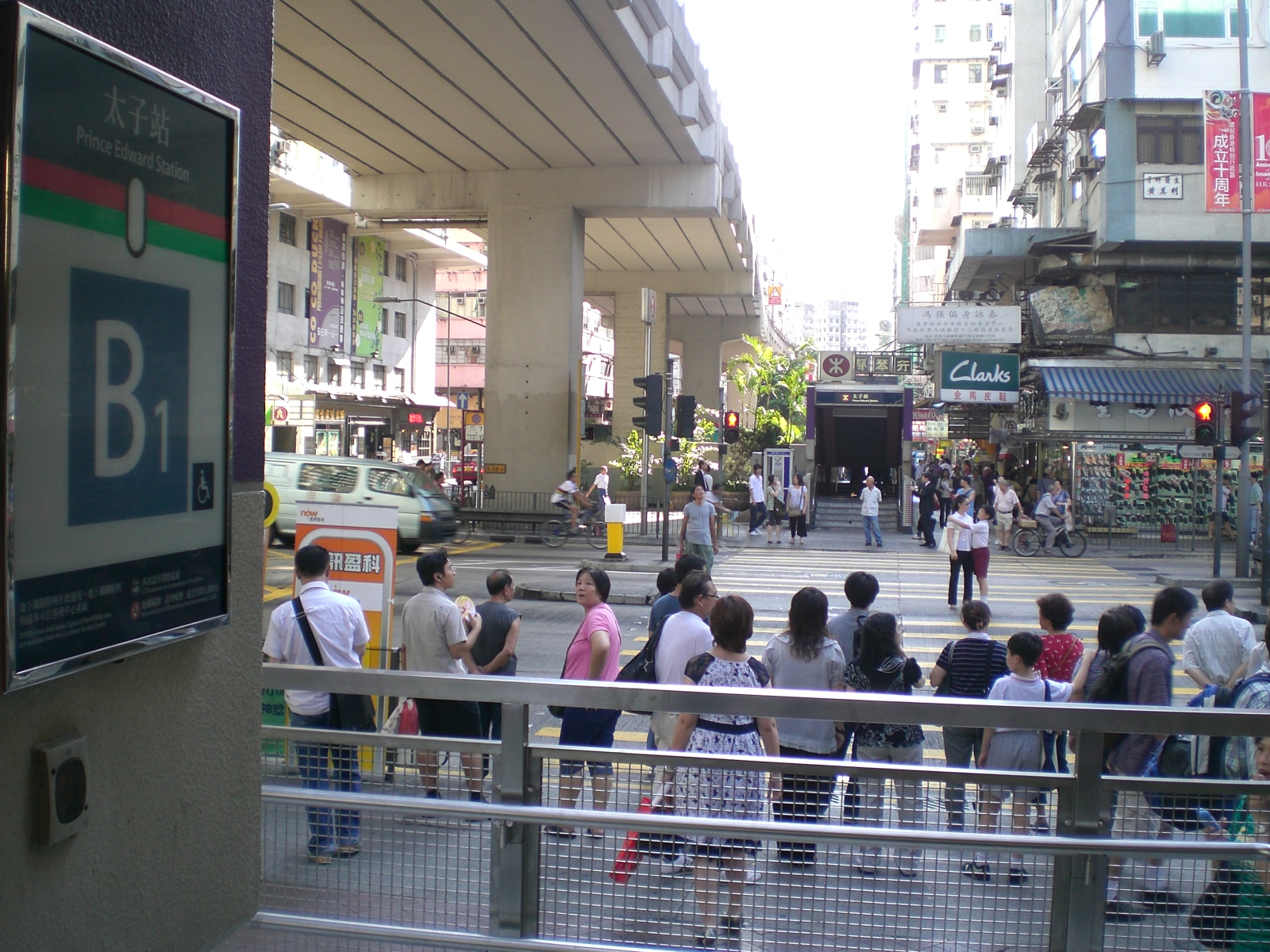
Exit B1 of Prince Edward station, with Exit C1 across Prince Edward Road West

The main thoroughfares are:

- Argyle Street
- Canton Road
- Nathan Road
- Prince Edward Road
- Shanghai Street

Three rail lines serve the area:

- The MTR Tsuen Wan and Kwun Tong lines have two stations in this area: Prince Edward station to the north and Mong Kok station to the south.
- The MTR East Rail line has Mong Kok East station in the eastern part of the area.

== Popular culture ==
Mong Kok was the setting for the 2004 hit film One Night in Mongkok directed by Derek Yee. The movie portrays Mong Kok, one of the most densely populated places on Earth, as a hotbed of illicit activity. Similarly, the district was also the setting of the 1996 film Mongkok Story (旺角風雲) directed by Wilson Yip, which depicts a young man who becomes involved in a triad gang. The 2009 film To Live and Die in Mongkok and the 2013 film Young and Dangerous: Reloaded are also set in Mong Kok. The literal Chinese title of the 1988 film As Tears Go By by Wong Kar-wai is "Mong Kok Carmen". Part of Robert Ludlum's 1986 novel The Bourne Supremacy was set in Mong Kok.

The area is known locally for a youth subculture, the Mong Kok culture.

== 2014 protests ==
Mong Kok was one of the main sites of the 2014 Hong Kong protests. Banks, jewellery stores and clothing stores were closed as a result of the pro-democracy protests.
