= Mong Kok Computer Centre =

Shopping mall for computers in Kowloon

Coordinates: 22.3185°N 114.1710°E

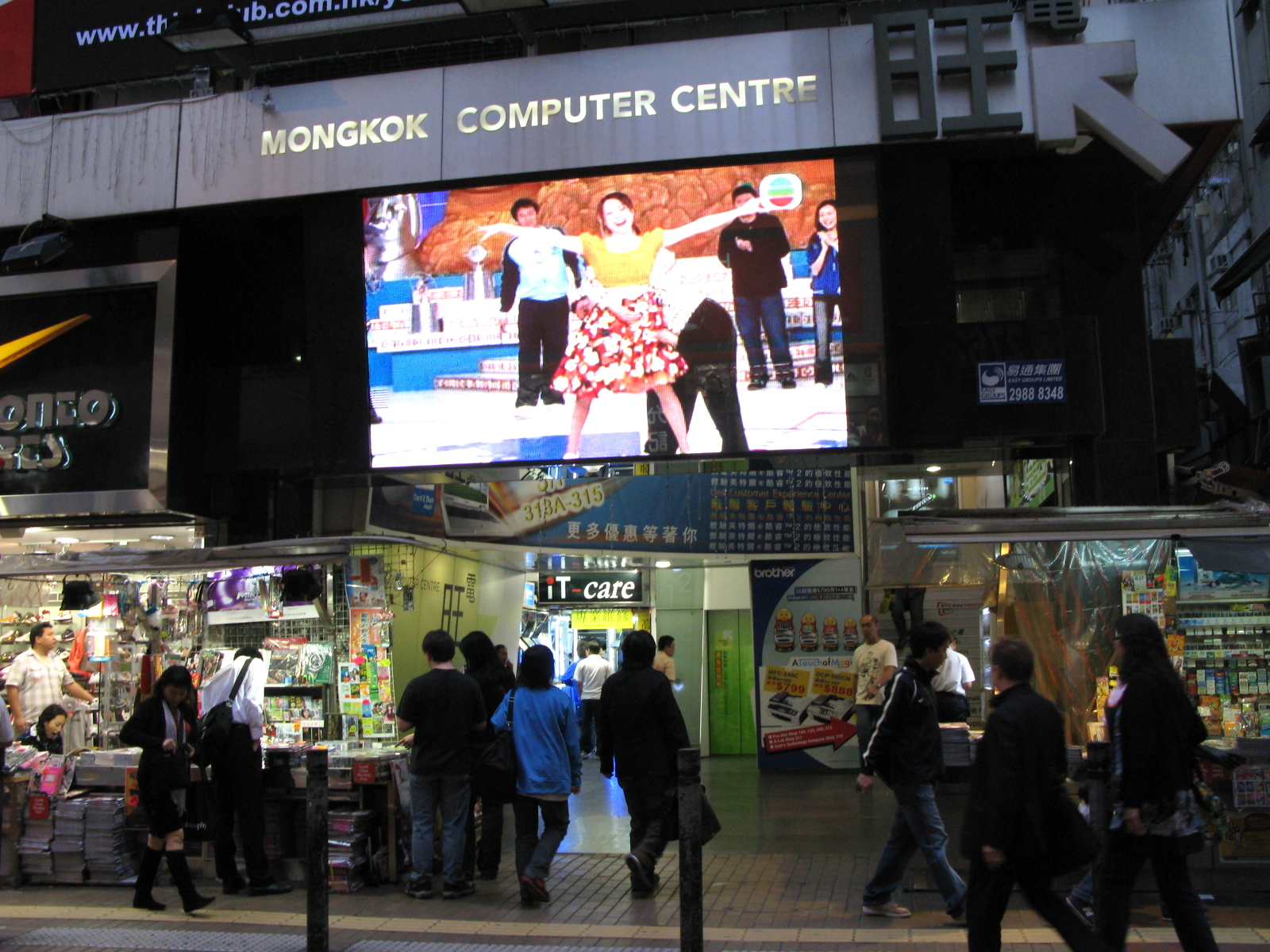
Entrance of Mong Kok Computer Centre in Nelson Street.

Mong Kok Computer Centre (Chinese: 旺角電腦中心; Jyutping: mong6 gok3 din6 nou5 zung1 sam1) is a shopping mall for computers and computer related products in Nelson Street, in Mong Kok, Hong Kong.

The three floor mall houses more than 70 computer shops and attracts some 10,000 customers daily. Shops sell various kinds of products, including laptops, computer software, hardware and other accessories. Most shops offer made-to-order computers with customizable configurations, while others offer individual parts for customers who prefer to build own machines.

Free Wi-Fi access is offered in the shopping mall.

== Ownership ==
In the 1990s, the building was owned by Tang Shing-bor (鄧成波), a major property investor in Mong Kok. Alpha Investment Partners, the property investment fund of Keppel Land of Singapore, bought it for HK$750 million in January 2007.

== Strikes by tenants ==
In February 2009, shop operators and tenants went on strikes to demand a rent cut during the economic downturn. Another strike occurred in April 2009, over complaints that computer festival bargains were cutting into their sales.

== Transportation ==
Mong Kok station Exit D3, E2

== See also ==
- Golden Computer Centre and Golden Computer Arcade
