= Shantung Street =

Street in Hong Kong

Coordinates: 22.31764°N 114.17007°E

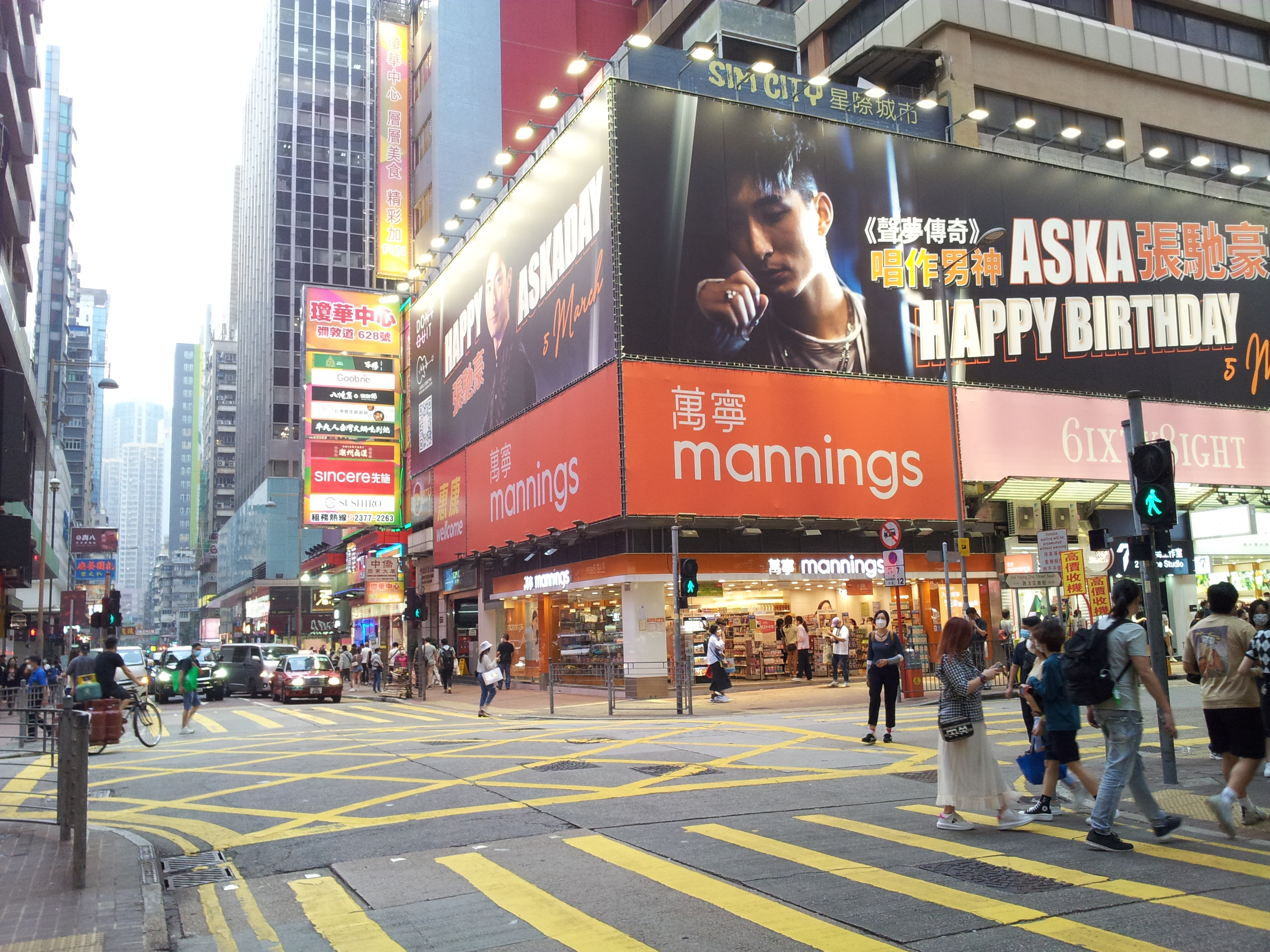
Shantung Street, Mong Kok. (2022)

Shantung Street (Chinese: 山東街) is a street in Mong Kok, Kowloon in Hong Kong. It spans from Ferry Street in the west to Yim Po Fong Street in the east.

== Features ==
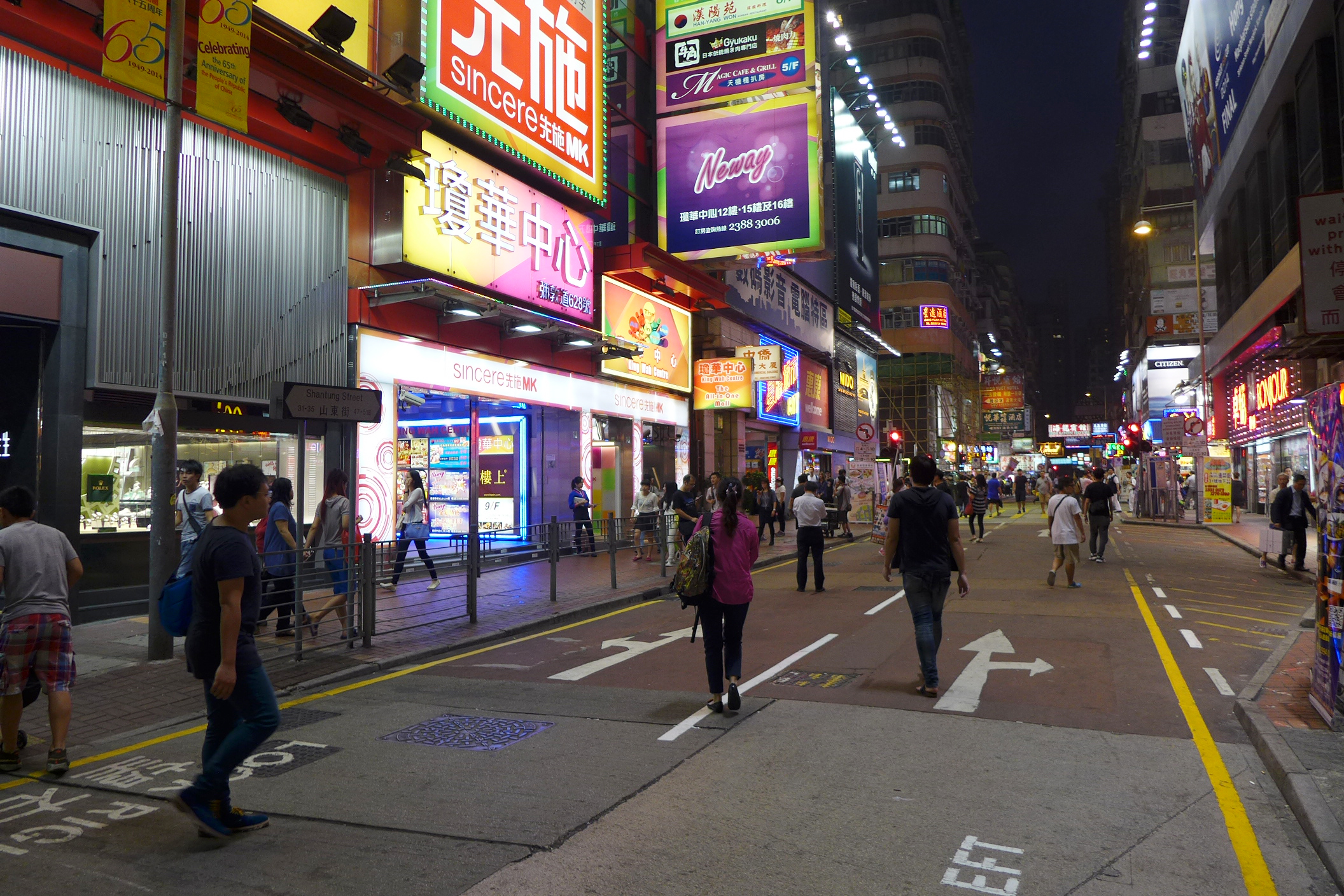
Night view of the street (2014)

Major landmarks including Langham Place and Macpherson Playground are situated along the street. The major road Nathan Road separates the street into two halves. A computer shopping centre is located in the eastern half. The western half was much quieter than the eastern one until the completion of Langham Place in late 2004.

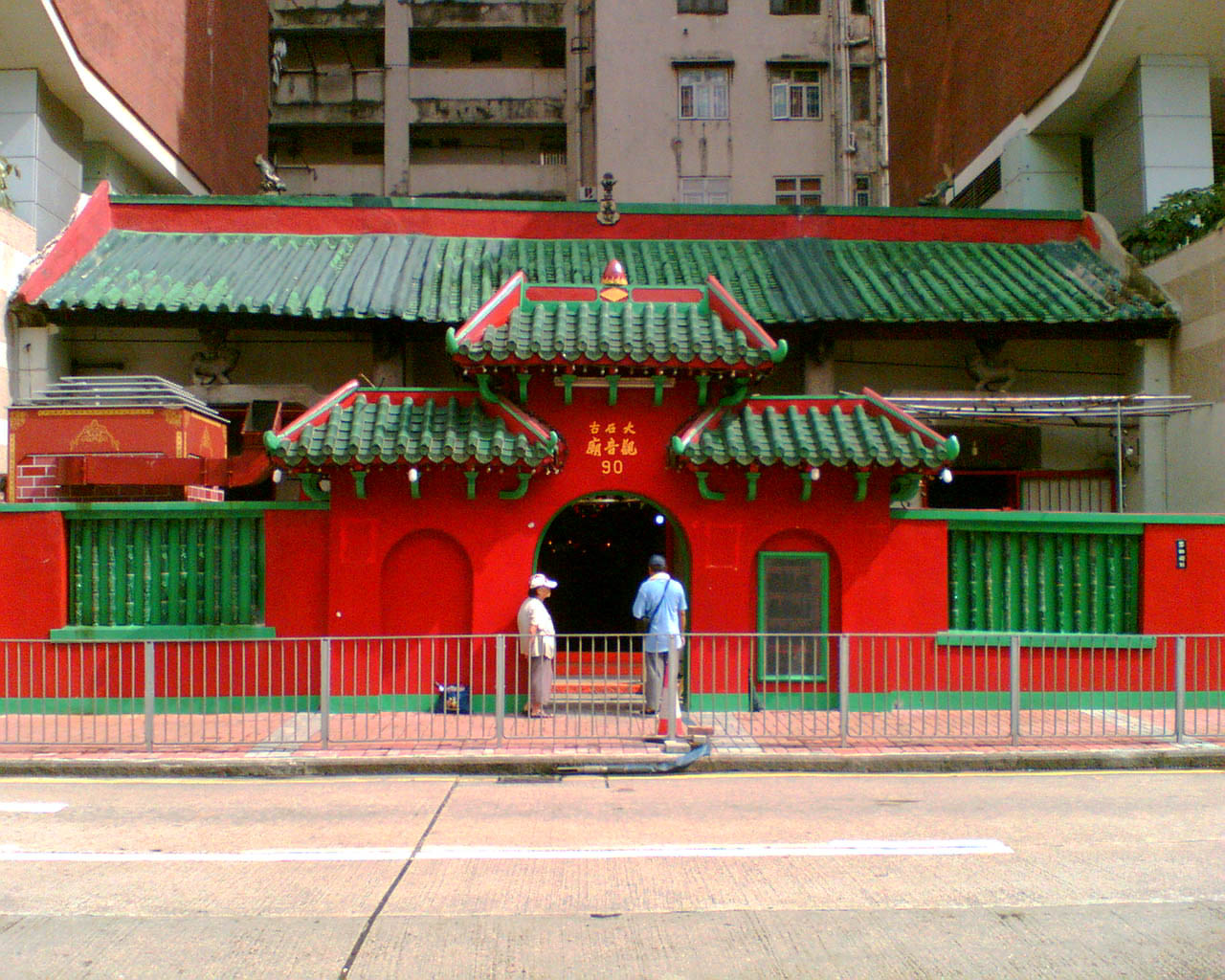
Shui Yuet Temple in Shantung Street.

Shui Yuet Temple (水月宫), located at 90 Shantung Street and built in 1927, is dedicated to Guanyin. It is listed as a Grade III historic building.

A much debated project by the Urban Renewal Authority may modify the eastern part of the street substantially.

== See also ==
- List of streets and roads in Hong Kong
