= Yuen Po Street Bird Garden =

Garden in Mong Kok, Kowloon, Hong Kong

Coordinates: 22.325979°N 114.173890°E

- Traditional Chinese: 園圃街雀鳥花園
- Cantonese Yale: yùhn póu gāai jeuk níuh fā yún
Transcriptions
Yue: Cantonese
- Yale Romanization: yùhn póu gāai jeuk níuh fā yún
- Jyutping: jyun4 pou2 gaai1 zoek3 niu5 faa1 jyun4

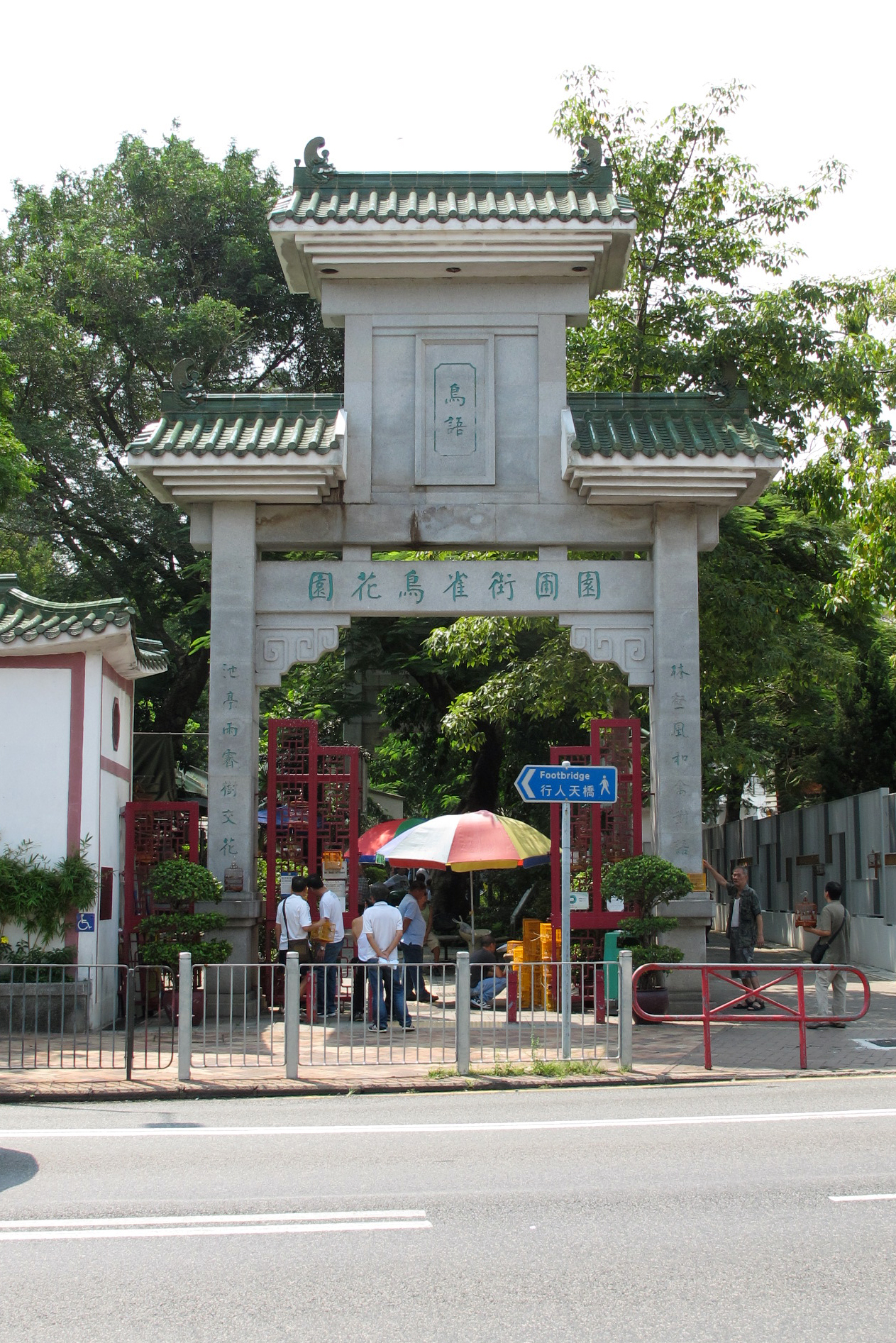
Main entrance of the Bird Garden, along Boundary Street.

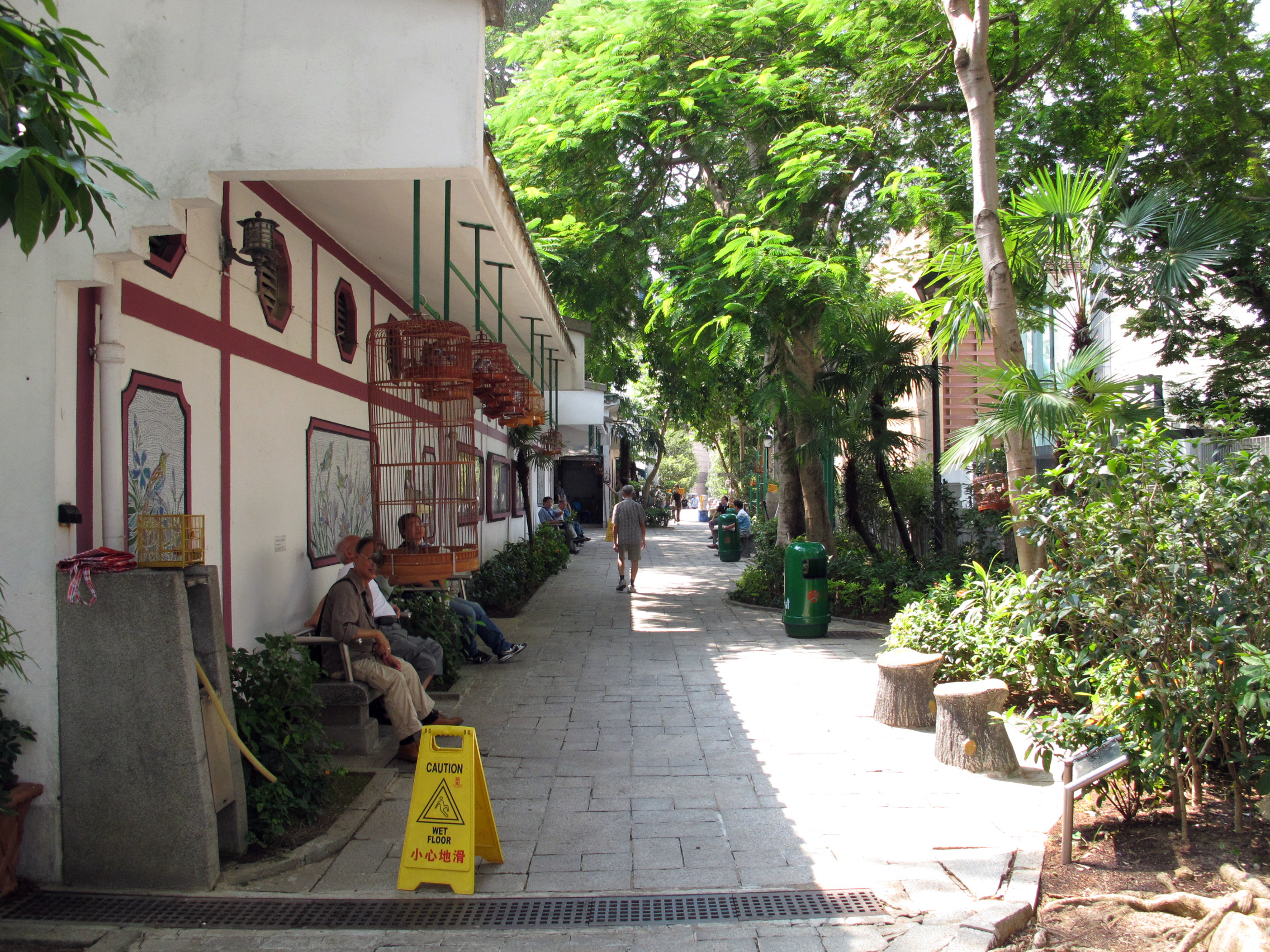
Inside the Bird Garden.

Yuen Po Street Bird Garden (Chinese: 園圃街雀鳥花園) is located in Mong Kok, Kowloon, Hong Kong, directly west of Mong Kok Stadium and near Mong Kok East station. The garden occupies an area of 32,000 sq ft (3,000m^{2}) and is bounded by Boundary Street, Embankment Road, Prince Edward Road West and Yuen Po Street.

== History ==
The garden was established after the former "Bird Street" at Hong Lok Street (雀仔街), off Argyle Street, was demolished by the former Land Development Corporation (now the Urban Renewal Authority) in the early 1990s. Langham Place was built on the site of the former Bird Street. Construction of the replacement garden was completed in March 1997 on a more peripheral site.

The market was closed on 5 July 2012, following a positive swab sample of H5N1 avian influenza virus, from a bird cage of oriental magpie-robins. It was closed for 21 days and re-opened on 26 July. Each of the 69 affected shops were compensated with HK$12,000 and their rents waived for a month by the Agriculture, Fisheries and Conservation Department.
