= Fa Yuen Street =

Street in Mong Kok, Kowloon, Hong Kong

Coordinates: 22.31773°N 114.17148°E

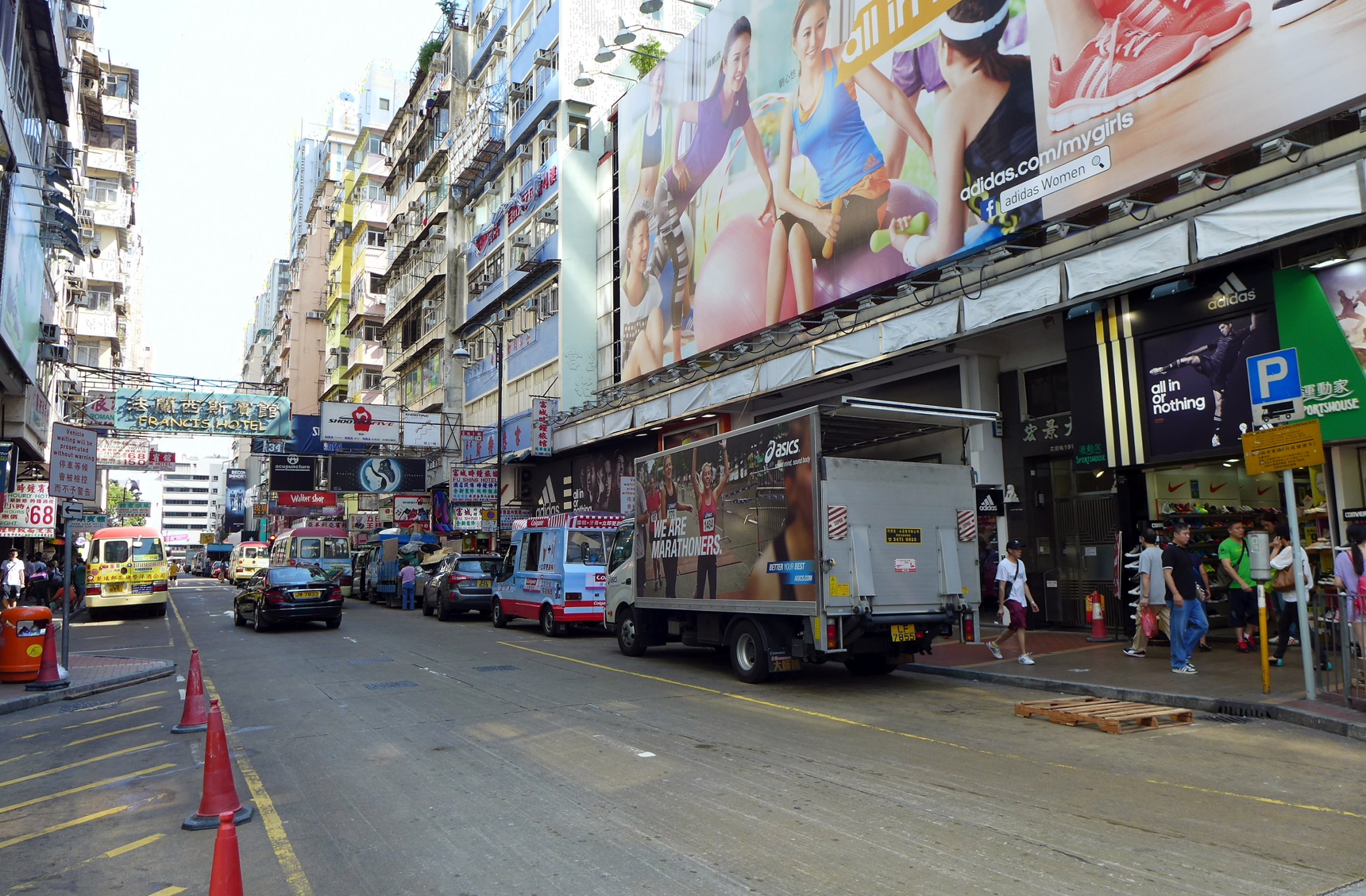
Fa Yuen Street or Sport Shoes Street.

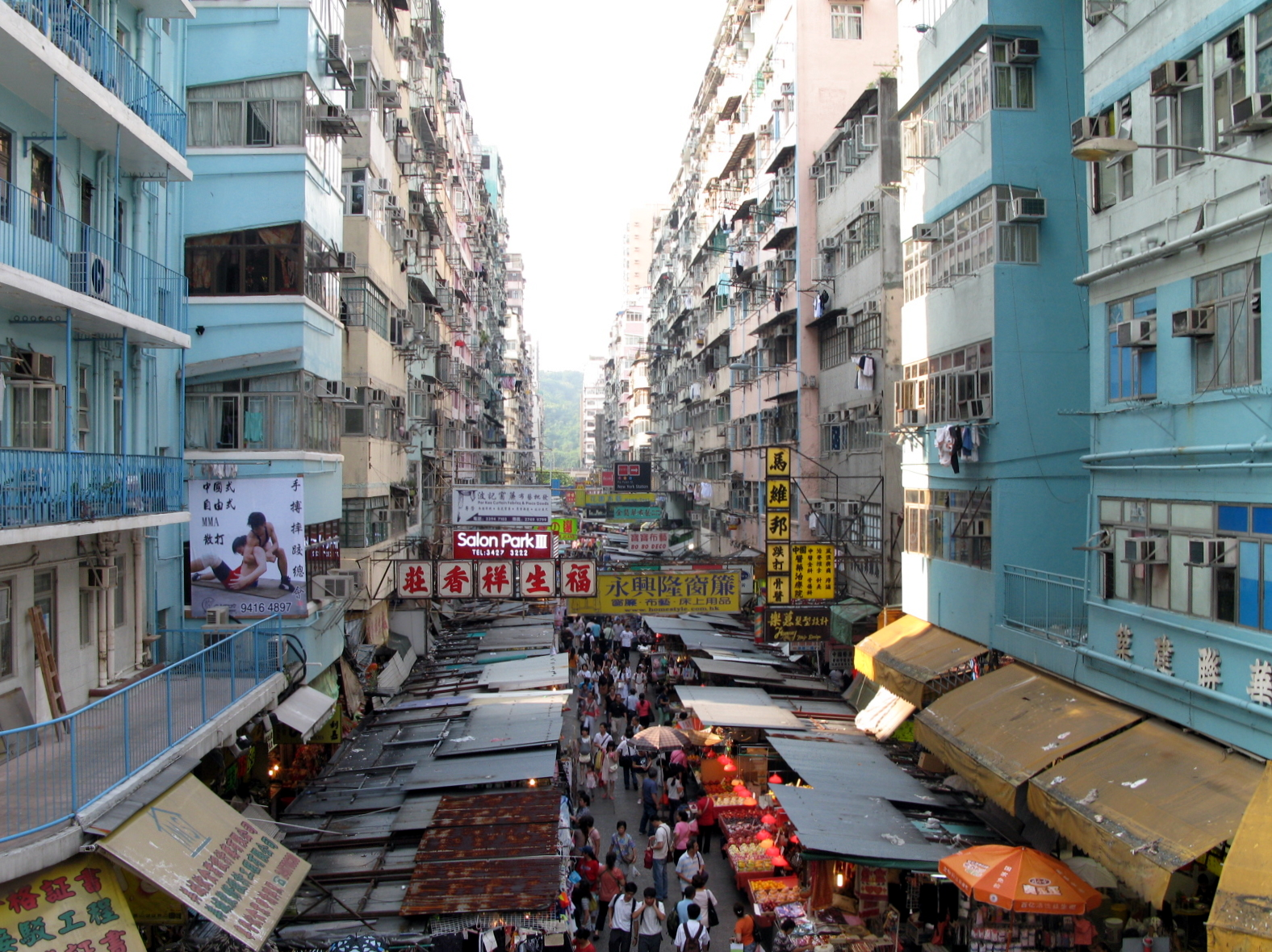
Market stalls in Fa Yuen Street.

Fa Yuen Street (traditional Chinese: 花園街; simplified Chinese: 花园街; Cantonese Yale: fa1 yun4 gaai1; pinyin: Huāyuán Jiē) is a street between Boundary Street and Dundas Street in Mong Kok, Kowloon, Hong Kong. With over fifty stores selling sport shoes, the street is famous for selling sport gear and is known as Sport Shoes Street or Sneaker Street (波鞋街). Fa Yuen (花園) means "garden" in Cantonese.

A much debated project of the Urban Renewal Authority may modify the street substantially.

== History ==
During the Ming Dynasty (A.D 1368-AD. 1644) and the Qing Dynasty (AD 1644-AD 1911), Fa Yuen Street was a place of growing flowers, that belonged to Mong Kok village at that time.

== Characteristics ==
Fa Yuen Street is a retail street with shops and hawker stalls selling bargain-priced fashion and casual wear for men, women and children and they usually open between 10:30 and 22:30 daily.

At one point of Fa Yuen Street, the road is closed off to private cars for the convenience of the fresh produce market, which sells a variety of exotic fruits and vegetables in the middle of the street. Directly adjacent to these produce stalls, located on the ground floors of the buildings lining Fa Yuen Street, are the cheapest clothing boutiques.

== 2011 fire ==
On 30 November 2011, the fire broke out at a hawker stall that spread to a housing flat resulting in 9 deaths and 34 injured. The density of the market and residential buildings make this area prone to such fire tragedies.

== See also ==
- Ho King Commercial Building
- Tung Choi Street
- List of streets and roads in Hong Kong
