= Tung Choi Street =

Street in Mong Kok, Kowloon, Hong Kong

Coordinates: 22°19′8.8602″N 114°10′14.1126″E

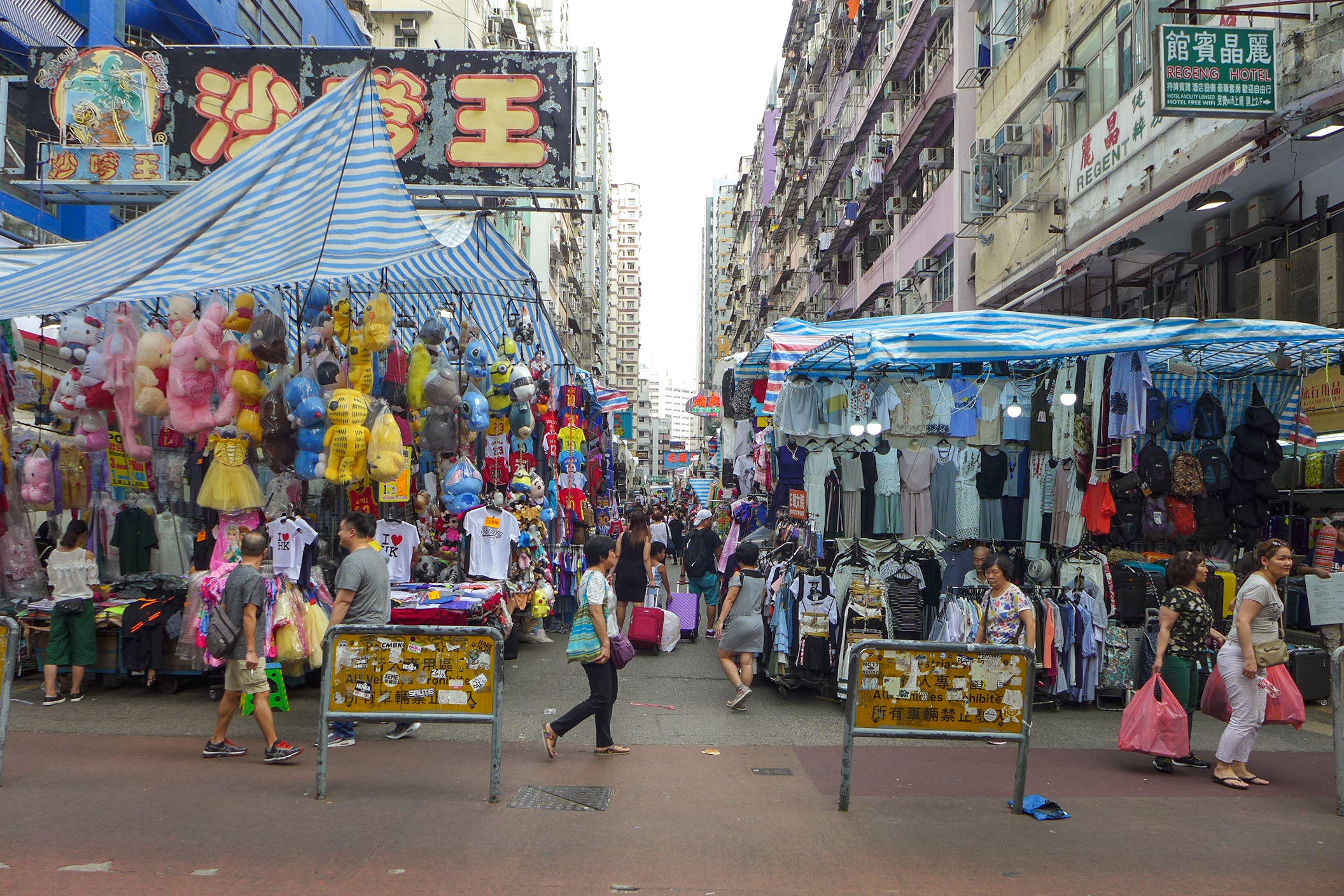
- Merchandise on display at Ladies' Market on Tung Choi Street.
- Chinese: 通菜街
Transcriptions
Standard Mandarin
- Hanyu Pinyin: Tōngcài Jiē
Yue: Cantonese
- Yale Romanization: tūng choi gāai
- Jyutping: tung1 coi3 gaai1

Tung Choi Street (Chinese: 通菜街; Jyutping: tung1 coi3 gaai1; Cantonese Yale: tūng choi gāai; pinyin: tōngcàijiē) is a street situated between south of Sai Yeung Choi Street and Fa Yuen Street in Mong Kok, Kowloon, Hong Kong. It is one of the best-known street markets in Hong Kong. Its southern section, popularly known as Ladies' Market or Ladies' Street (女人街), sells various, low-priced products for women and also other general merchandise. Its northern section not far above Bute Street, has a wide variety of affordable plants, pet supplies and animals especially goldfish since it is also known as "Goldfish Street".

== See also ==
- Men's Street
- List of streets and roads in Hong Kong
