= Mong Kok Road =

Large street in Kowloon, Hong Kong

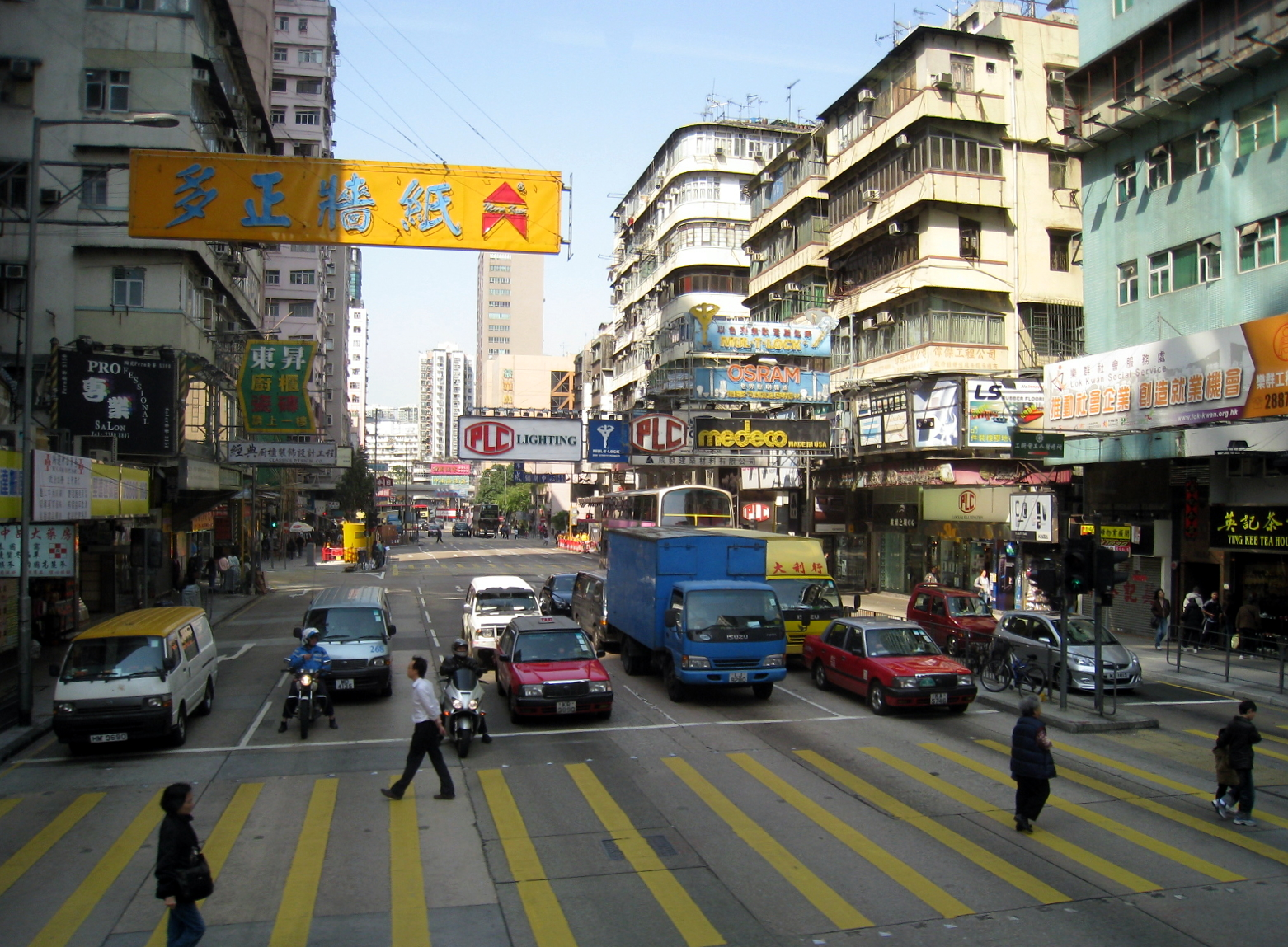
- Mong Kok Road facing East
- Native name: 旺角道
- Namesake: Mong Kok
- Location: Mong Kok, Kowloon, Hong Kong
- Coordinates: 22°19′15″N 114°10′07″E
- West end: Tong Mi Road
- East end: Sai Yee Street

Mong Kok Road 旺角道
- Traditional Chinese: 旺角道
- Simplified Chinese: 旺角道
Transcriptions
Standard Mandarin
- Hanyu Pinyin: Wàngjiǎo Dào
Hakka
- Romanization: wang4 jiao3 dao4
Yue: Cantonese
- Jyutping: wong6 gok3 dou6

Mong Kok Road (Chinese: 旺角道) is a road in Kowloon, Hong Kong, running through the entirety of Mong Kok. It begins at Tong Mi Road in the west, and runs past Nathan Road until reaching Sai Yee Street in the east. There is a footbridge that runs over Mong Kok Road between MOKO and Portland Street, providing access between Mong Kok Station and Mong Kok East Station.

== History ==
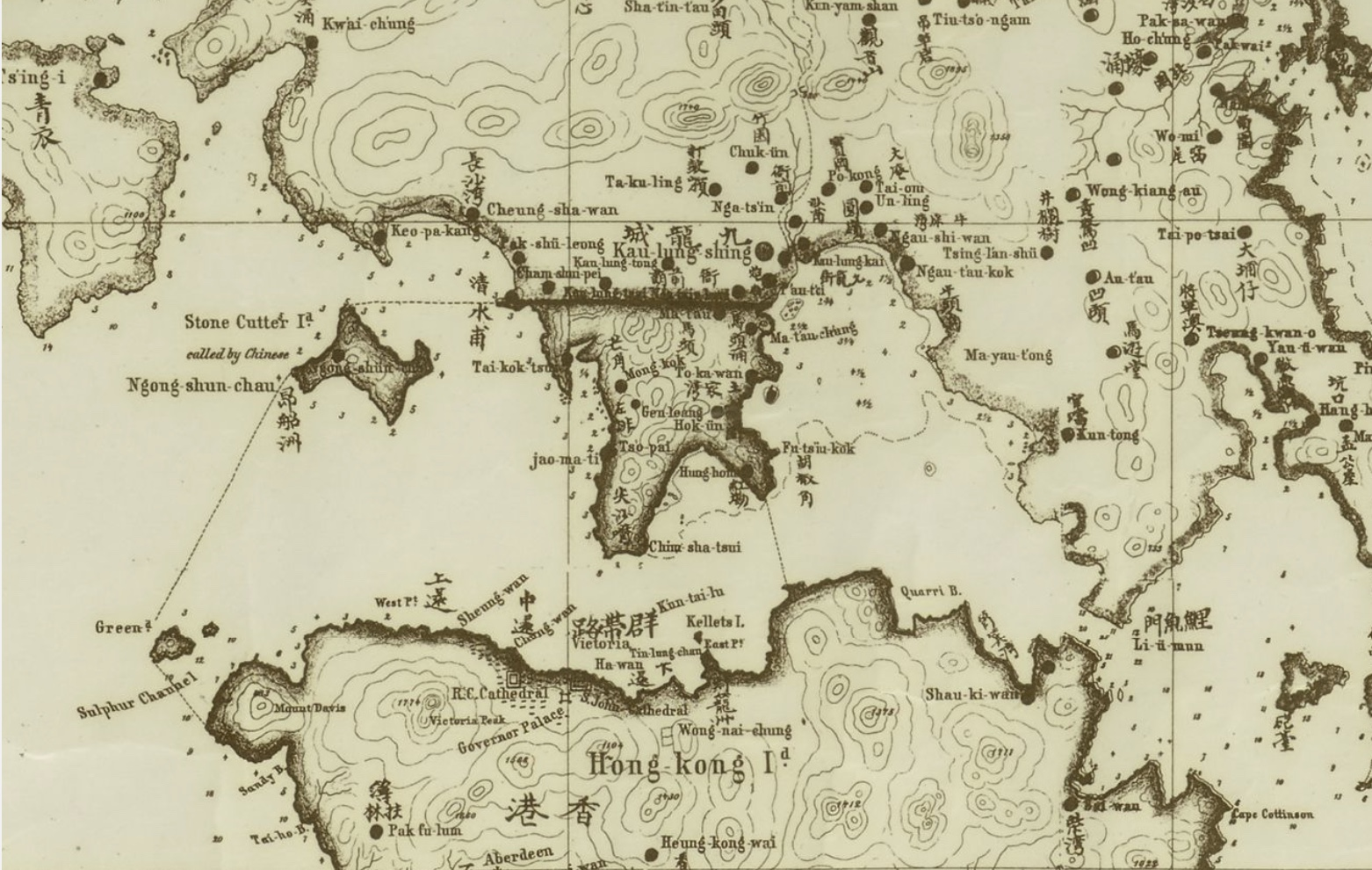
Map of Hong Kong by Italian Missionary Simeone Volonteri in 1868. Mong Kok Village is in the center of the map.

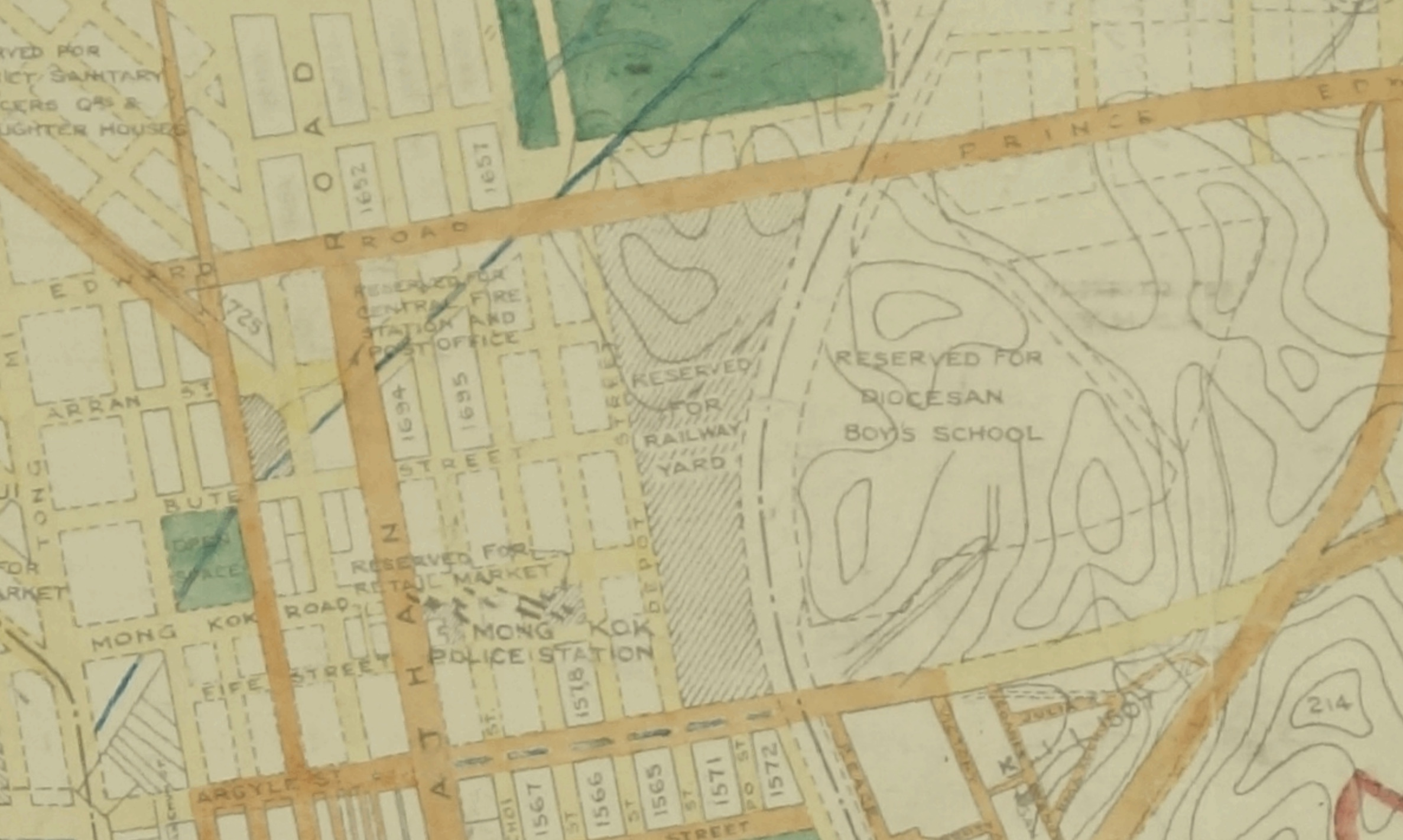
Planned Development of Mong Kok in 1926, Mong Kok Road is in the left, under planning.

Before 1929, today's Mong Kok Road was part of Mong Kok Village (芒角村), which had already been charted and named in an 1866 map by the Italian missionary Simeone Volonteri, marked as Mong Kok.

From 1900 to 1904, there was a large reclamation project off the coast of Yau Ma Tei that pushed the coastline from Reclamation Street to Ferry Street. In the 1920s, the village gradually lost its land to urban construction of the Government, and by the 1930s was taken possession of by the Government and demolished. The new planned road was named in a Government Gazette on 28 Sep 1923:

''Road immediately to the south of Kowloon Inland Lots 1289, 1400, 1431 and 1420 beginning at its junction with Tong Mi Road and running in an easterly direction terminating at its junction with Depot Road [today's Sai Yee Street] ... Mong Kok Road 旺 角 道

— No. 411, Hong Kong Government Gazette, 28 September 1923,

Four main roads were erected over the old Mong Kok Village: Sai Yeung Choi Street, Fa Yuen Street, Tung Choi Street, and Sai Yee Street. Mong Kok Road was already a bustling street of the city by 1955, especially at its intersection with Nathan Road.

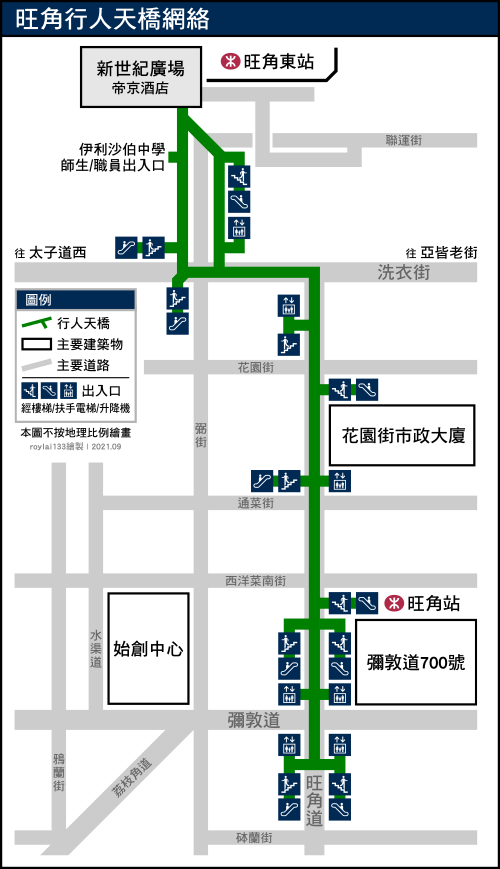
A diagram of the Mong Kok Pedestrian Footbridge System

The Mong Kok Pedestrian Footbridge System began construction in 1998 by Sun Hung Kai Properties, and the section between Mong Kok East Station and Nathan Road was completed in 2003. After more than two decades of delays, the section of the Footbridge crossing Nathan Road was completed and opened on 30 Sept 2021.

== Transportation ==
=== Mong Kok traffic control since the 1970s ===
As the MTR was built in the 1970s, and some exits of the Mong Kok Station had occupied the right lanes of Argyle Street from Sai Yeung Choi Street to Portland Street, thus the government at the time had made the control in effect: vehicles can only travel westbound on Argyle Street between those two streets mentioned above. As a result, vehicles from Tai Kok Tsui via Argyle Street, eastbound towards Kowloon City, should make a left turn onto Reclamation Street and then a right onto Mong Kok Road. After crossing the junction between Mong Kok Road and Nathan Road, one shall turn right to either Sai Yeung Choi Street South or Sai Yee Street in order to lead back to Argyle Street. For the same reason, all vehicles are not allowed to make a right turn directly from Nathan Road to Argyle Street, and must follow the route described above. With a large number of buses and minivans passing through this section daily, these intersections have frequently encountered accidents and problems of traffic congestion. There have been plans to correct this, but they are still in discussion.

=== MTR ===
The MTR's Mong Kok station has two exits on this road: Exits A and B. Exit B directly leads to the Mong Kok Road Footbridge System at the intersection of Mong Kok Road and Sai Yeung Choi Street South.

== Intersecting roads ==
Roads are listed West to East.

- Fuk Tsun Street, Anchor Street and Tong Mi Road
- Arran Lane
- Cheung Wong Road
- Canton Road
- Reclamation Street
- Shanghai Street
- Hong Lok Street
- Portland Street
- Nathan Road
- Sai Yeung Choi Street South
- Tung Choi Street
- Fa Yuen Street
- Sai Yee Street

== See also ==
- Mong Kok
- Argyle Street
- Nathan Road
- List of streets and roads in Hong Kong
