= Mong Kok Pedestrian Footbridge System =

Pedestrian footbridge

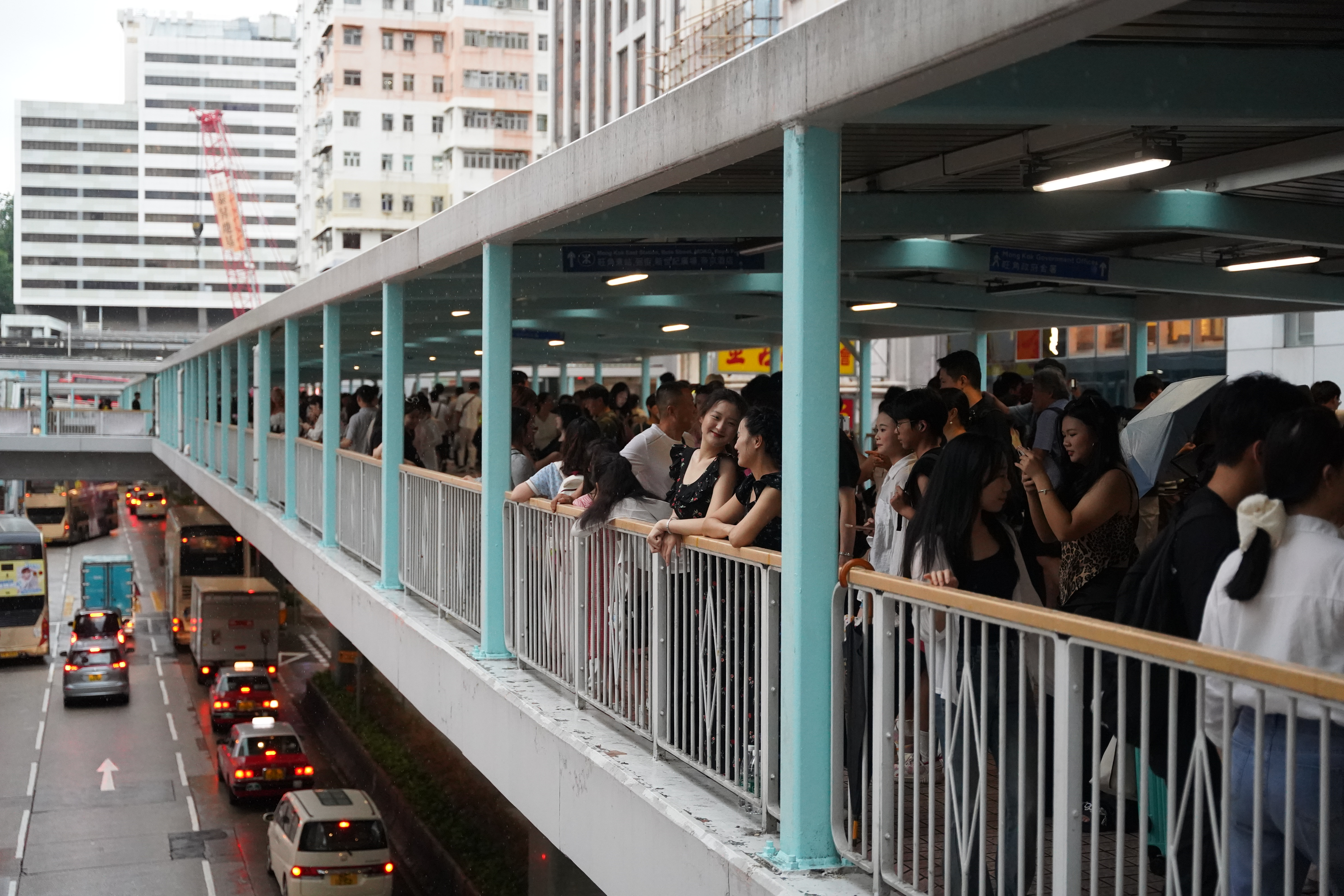
The footbridge in 2025, at the section above Sai Yeung Choi Street

The Mong Kok Pedestrian Footbridge System (Chinese: 旺角行人天橋系統), is a large pedestrian footbridge system in Hong Kong connecting Mong Kok East station and MOKO in the east with Mong Kok station in the west.

== History ==
The bridge was built to ease the high pedestrian flow along the narrow and crowded streets in the heart of Mong Kok, allowing better access for pedestrians and vehicles towards Mong Kok.

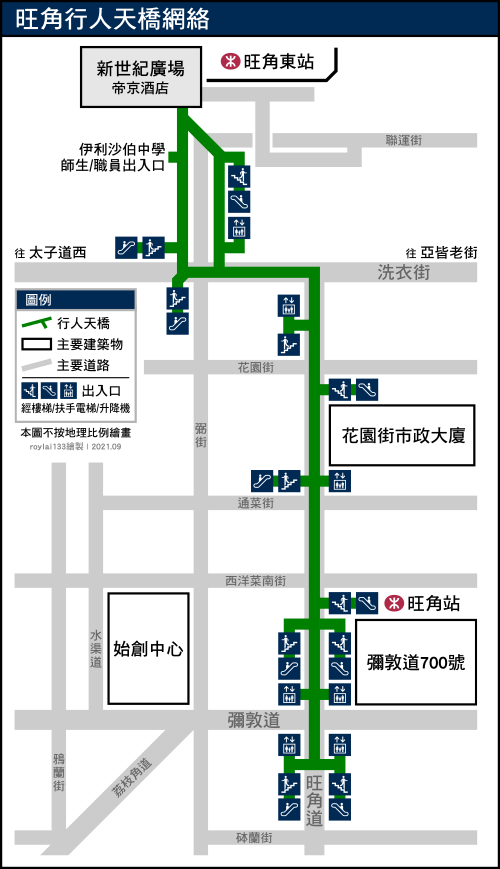
A diagram of the Mong Kok Pedestrian Footbridge System (in Chinese)

The Mong Kok Pedestrian Footbridge System began construction in 1998 by Sun Hung Kai Properties, and the section between Mong Kok East Station and Nathan Road was completed in 2003. After more than two decades of delays, the section of the Footbridge crossing Nathan Road was completed and opened on 30 Sept 2021.

== Route ==
The bridge begins in the east through an escalator connecting to MOKO and Mong Kok East station. It moves over Bute Street and crosses Luen Wan Street. A pathway towards Queen Elizabeth School is located here.

The bridge then takes a left turn and goes over Sai Yee Street, parallel to the old Water Supplies Department's Mong Kok Branch (demolished 2019). It then takes a right turn and takes a course along Mong Kok Road. The bridge crosses Fa Yuen Street, Tung Choi Street, Sai Yeung Choi Street, and connects to Exit A of Mong Kok station. It then crosses Nathan Road and opens towards Portland Street in the west.

== Current ==
With the influx of tourists from the Mainland, the bridge has become a popular photo-taking spot after it gained popularity from Xiaohongshu (outside China known as Rednote). According to some photographers, the bridge gives the quintessentially authentic feel of Hong Kong.
