= Street performance in Hong Kong =

Street performance or busking is the act of performing in public places. Busking is legal in Hong Kong and all street performers are protected under Hong Kong Basic Law Article 34. Hong Kong government does not apply licensing system for street performers and there is no official data about the number of street performers in Hong Kong.

== Location ==
Located at Sai Yeung Choi Street in Mong Kok, music, speaker, sirens and horns can be loudly heard. The Hong Kong government has adopted pedestrian schemes for this street, in which it prohibits vehicles to pass by from 4pm to 10pm on Monday to Saturday; and from noon to 10pm on Sunday and public holidays. However, on 30 July 2018 the zone was shut down for street performance by the district council due to the noise disturbance to the local residents and shop owners and retailers. The government also announced that the zone will be reopened to vehicles on 4 August 2018.

== Street performers ==
Street performers perform whatever they want in public space, unless they pose a "noise nuisance". There has been varied performances related to music, dancing, and acting for a talent show. Among street performers in Sai Yeung Choi Street, Mr Funny is the first one to get prosecuted in 2005.

== Government policy ==
The opening hours of Mong Kok’s Sai Yeung Choi Street has been shortened to weekends and holiday since November, 2013. The escalating number of complaints regarding noise and crowds by Mong Kok residents and shop owners led to this change. Street performance in the streets is not under any regulation currently. Street performers perform freely along the pedestrian zone. However, the residents who live just beyond the street have long endured the noise created by the performances. The street is also overwhelmed with audiences, blocking the way of pedestrians and disturbs shops operation.

The government has launched an Open Stage Pilot for six month from July and December 2010. Street performers were allowed to perform in the provided space. Those spaces included Hong Kong Cultural Centre, the Sha Tin Town Hall and Kwai Tsing Theatre. The scheme did not continue because of lack of usage. People gave negative feedbacks that the scheme has many limitations to the performers and the locations were far away from the crowd. Suggestions indicate that Hong Kong might take reference to Munich in Germany or United Kingdom, where the countries regulate street performances by licensing system. The latest plan of government has considered this suggestion, and decided to organize the street performers in the pedestrian by a license system. However the details still remain to be further discussed. People, including street performers and other related stakeholders hold different opinion towards this licensing regulation.

== Positive impact ==
=== An open stage ===
Street performance brings an open and interactive stage for diverse artists in Hong Kong. Artists who come from different growing backgrounds and born in different decades are welcomed to stand on this stage without any restriction ranging from rent to popularity. FM Theatre Power, a council-funded live art group, is a well-known figure of street performance aimed at breaking the barrier between audiences and performers using this stage. Some performers regard street performance as a connection to the community. Getting immediate response from audiences is what the performers expect.

=== A new tourist attraction ===
Street performance has the potential to be developed as a bucking tourist attraction in Hong Kong. Along with the sound of peddling, the combination of different styles’ tangible and non-tangible artwork is considered as a significant characteristic of Sai Yeung Choi Street. From martial arts to instrumental performances, all types of art can be found there. Foreign tourists view the street performance as a part of the local culture in Sai Yeung Choi Street. Diversity of street performance in Sai Yeung Choi Street creates a unique feature, which is viewed as a selling point by some of the performers, indicating a potential benefit of attracting both local and foreign tourists.

== Negative impact ==
=== Noise pollution ===
Some residents living nearby the street have complained that the loudspeakers from street performers produce big noises. They can hardly sleep deeply at night and kids cannot concentrate on doing their homework. As stated in the Noise Control Ordinance set by the Environmental Protection Department in 1997, noise levels in urban areas should be below 70 decibels. Yet, the bands performing on the street are obviously exceeding this limit. As recorded by reporters of South China Morning Post, sound levels were of between 94.6 and 102 decibels. This causes neighbors have hearing problem if they listen to loud music over a period of time. It also affects businesses running around that area. Due to high sound level, customers cannot listen to the salespersons properly and they are being driven away.

=== Congestion ===
Besides, street performances create crowd and make the road difficult to cross. Since 2000, Sai Yeung Choi Street South has adopted the pedestrian street scheme due to the heavy pedestrians and motorist traffic. However, the current situation violates the original intention of setting up the pedestrian street scheme. At present, the street is closed to vehicles from 4pm to 10pm from Monday to Saturday and from noon to 10pm on Sundays and public holidays. The street consist of performers, political activists and people promoting through internet or mobile phone services once the motorists are banned. When there is street performance, pedestrians stop and gather around the performers. Other pedestrians can hardly reach different shops along the street. Also, many visitors come to Mong Kok because of the renowned street performance. Nevertheless, the congestion problem may bring some annoyance to visitors and make them leaving a negative impression. It lowers the reputation of the quality of tourism in Hong Kong.

== Legal challenge ==
In 2014, Tony Lui Yuet-Tin submitted an Application for Leave for Judicial Review of the Transport Department's decision to reopen Sai Yeung Choi Street to traffic on weekdays. He is represented by Adam Clermont, an American with the firm of Payne Clermont, and Hiu H. Wong, a local barrister. On April 20, 2015, the High Court granted Mr. Lui's application and will determine whether the Transport Department's decision was proper.
