= Victory Avenue =

Road in Hong Kong

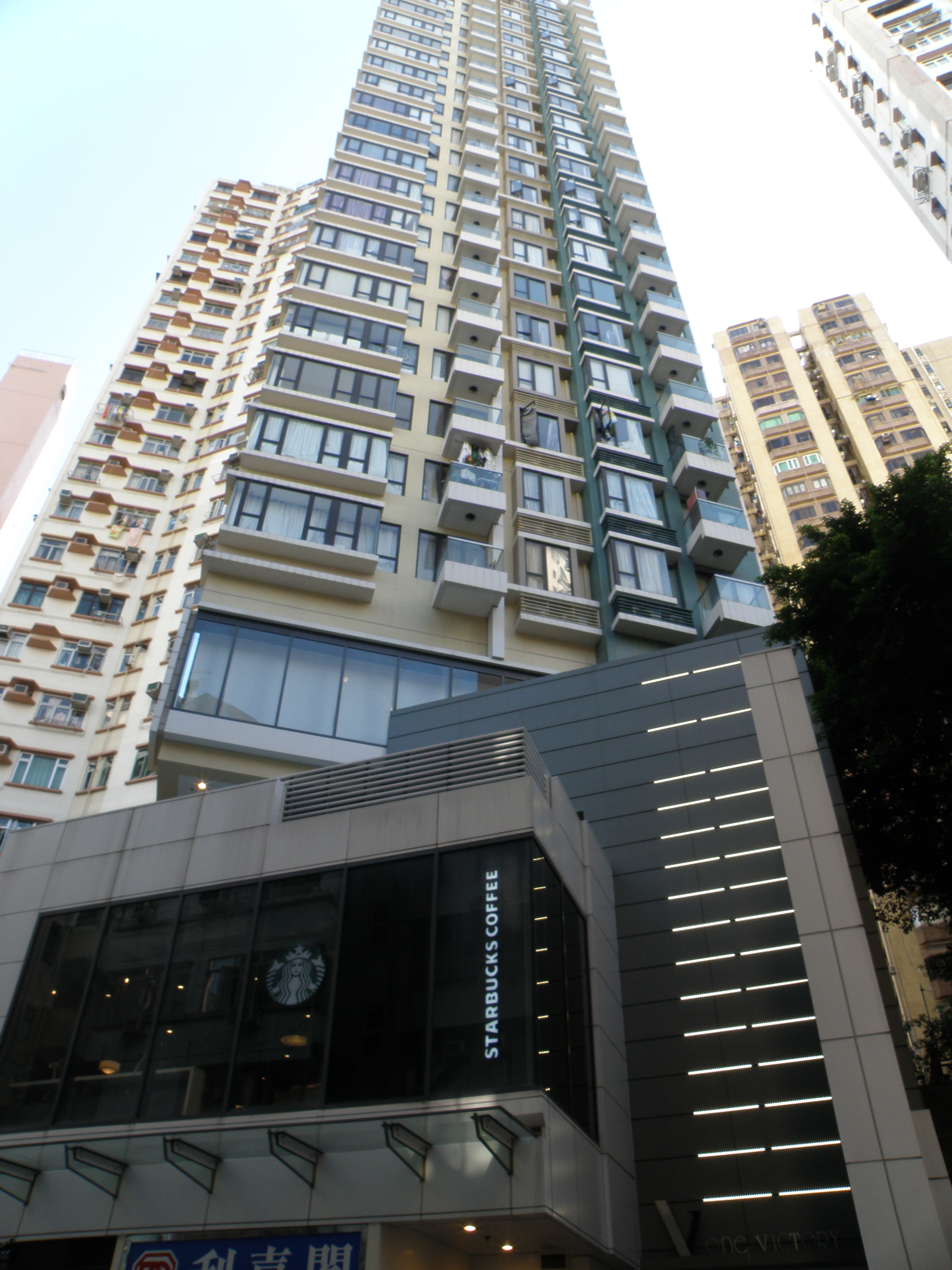
One Victory residential building in Victory Avenue

Victory Avenue (Chinese: 勝利道) is a street in Ho Man Tin, Kowloon City District. It begins at Argyle Street, and ends at Waterloo Road. There are a number of pet shops along the road, as well as restaurants due to the large number of schools around the area.
