= Prince Edward Road (Hong Kong) =

Road in Kowloon, Hong Kong

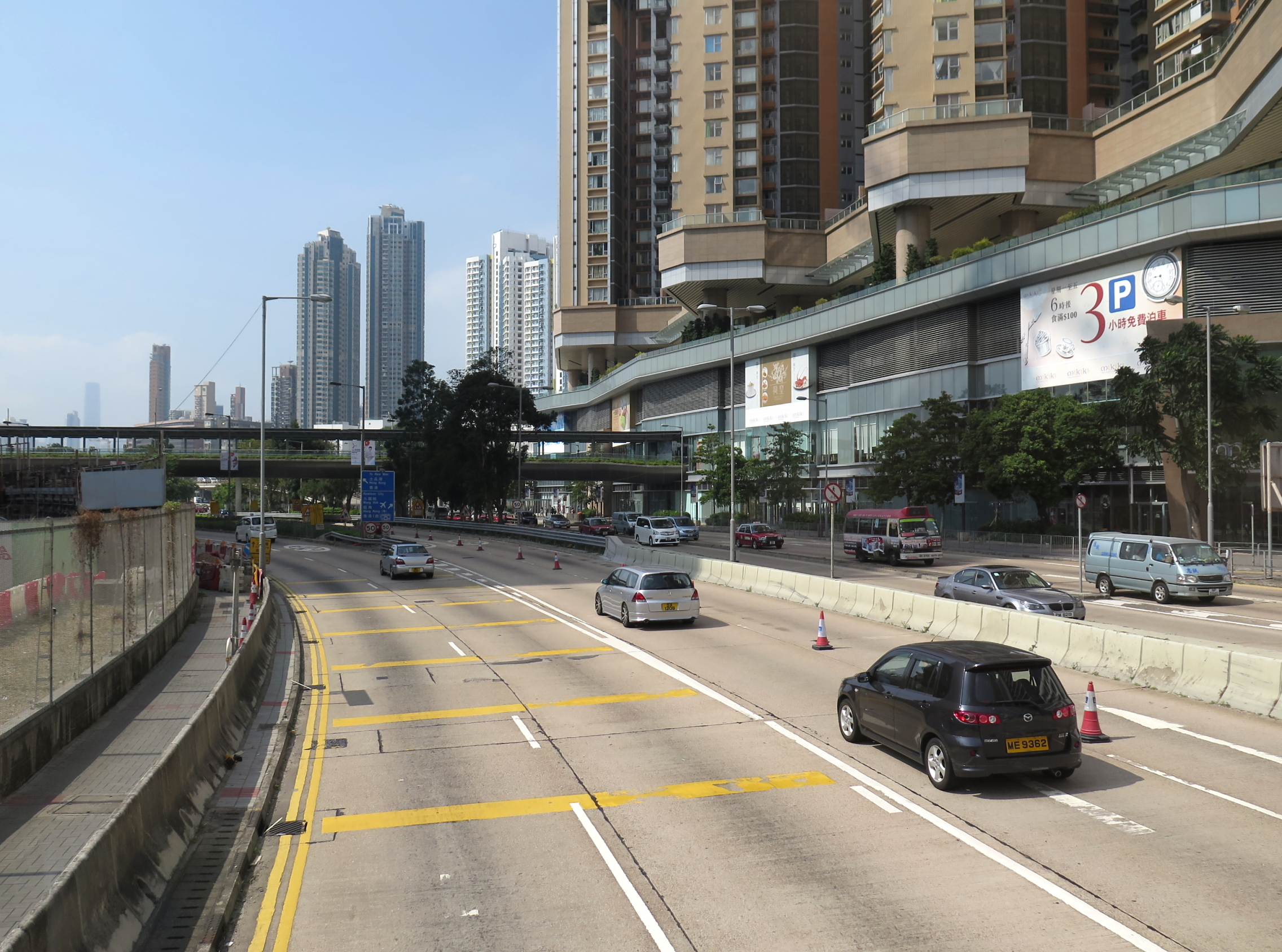
- Prince Edward Road East in San Po Kong
- Interactive map of Prince Edward Road
- Native name: 太子道 (Yue Chinese)
- Former name(s): Edward Avenue, Kashima-dori (During Japanese Occupation, 1942-1945)
- Namesake: Edward VIII
- Location: Prince Edward, Hong Kong
- Coordinates: 22.32538°N 114.18028°E

Prince Edward Road East
- Traditional Chinese: 太子道東
- Simplified Chinese: 太子道东
Transcriptions
Standard Mandarin
- Hanyu Pinyin: Tàizǐ Dào Dōng
Wu
- Wugniu: tha^{5} tsy^{3} dau^{4} ton^{1}
Yue: Cantonese
- Yale Romanization: taai3 ji2 dou6 dung1
- Jyutping: taai3 zi2 dou6 dung1

Prince Edward Road West
- Chinese: 太子道西
Transcriptions
Standard Mandarin
- Hanyu Pinyin: Tàizǐ Dào Xī
Wu
- Wugniu: tha^{5} tsy^{3} dau^{4} si^{1}
Yue: Cantonese
- Yale Romanization: taai3 ji2 dou6 sai1
- Jyutping: taai3 zi2 dou6 sai1

Prince Edward Road East (Chinese: 太子道東; Jyutping: taai^{5} zi^{2} dou^{6} dung^{1}) and Prince Edward Road West (Chinese: Chinese: 太子道西; Jyutping: taai^{5} zi^{2} dou^{6} sai^{1}) are roads in Kowloon, Hong Kong, going in an east-west direction and linking Tai Kok Tsui, Mong Kok, Kowloon Tong, Kowloon City and San Po Kong (outside the retired Kai Tak Airport).

The roads were named after Prince Edward in 1922, later Edward VIII, after his visit to Hong Kong.

Prince Edward station and the Prince Edward area in Hong Kong are both named after Prince Edward Road, rather than Prince Edward himself.

== Prince Edward Road ==
In the beginning of the 1920s, the Hong Kong government was developing the Mong Kok district and decided to build a road connecting this to Kowloon City. In April 1922, Prince Edward (later Edward VIII) came to Hong Kong and visited the construction of this road. Due to this visit, the government named this road Prince Edward Road. In the 1930s, Prince Edward Road was extended to the area of Ngau Chi Wan. During Japanese occupation, the road was renamed as Kashima-dori (鹿島通り).

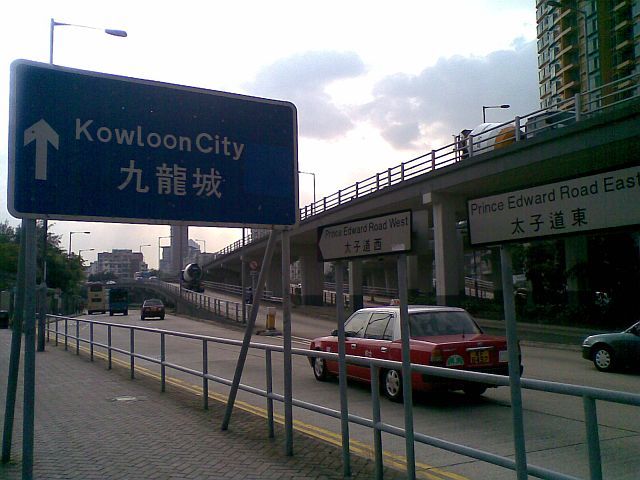
Prince Edward Road West and Prince Edward Road East

== Prince Edward Road West ==
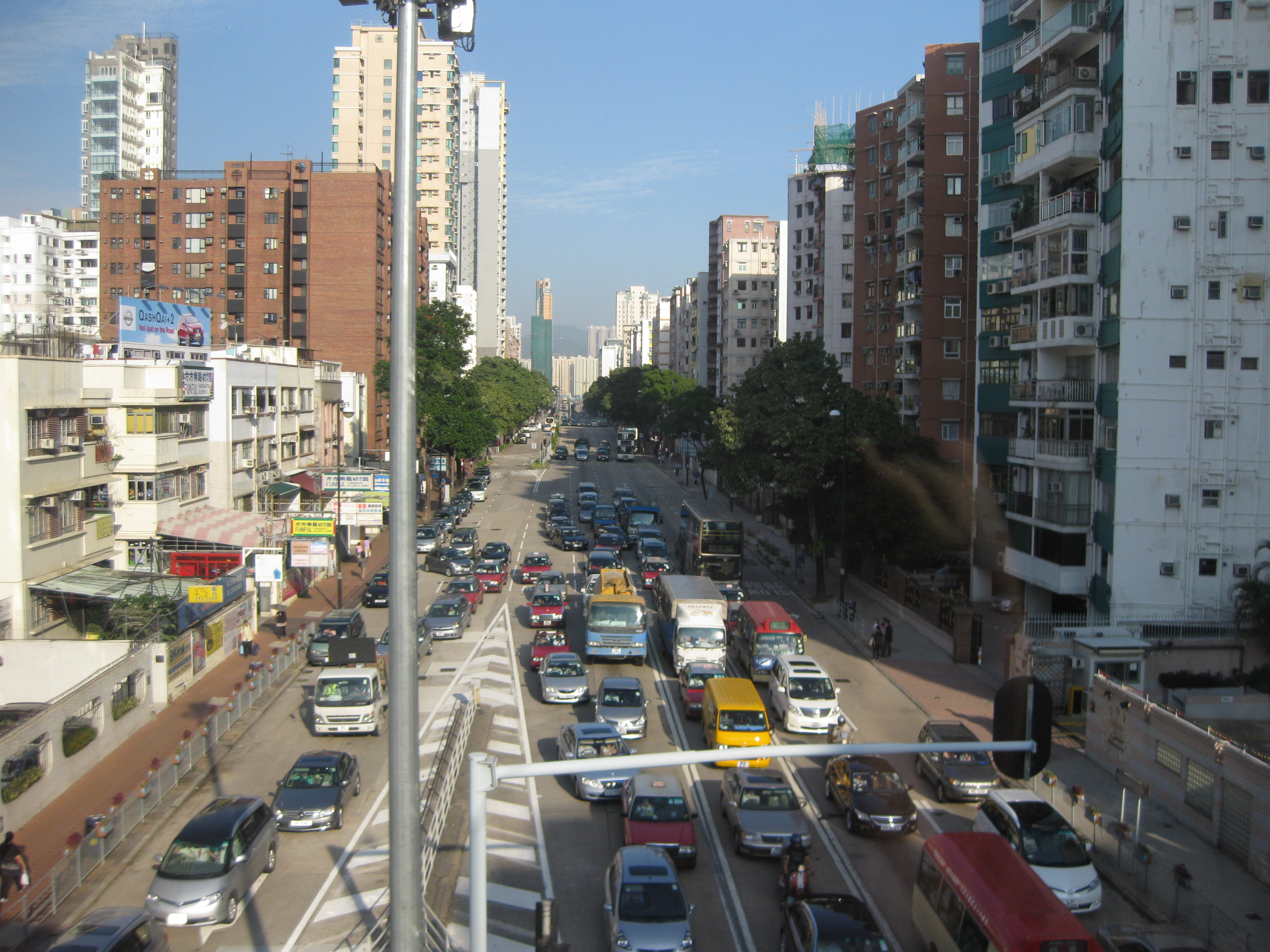
Prince Edward Road West is often congested

Prince Edward Road West is a road between Tai Kok Tsui, Mong Kok, Kowloon Tong and Kowloon City. This road was originally named Edward Avenue (宜華徑) before 1924. It was later renamed Prince Edward Road (英皇子道) in 1924, and in 1958 the Chinese name was changed from what was literally "British Royal Prince Road" to a new name (太子道) that is literally "Crown Prince Road" . In 1979, it became the Prince Edward Road West.

Prince Edward Road West starts from Kowloon City where it succeeds Prince Edward Road East. It runs across Kowloon City and Prince Edward, and ends at Tai Kok Tsui at an intersection with Tong Mi Road and West Kowloon Corridor.

The section of Prince Edward Road West from Olympic Garden to Nathan Road runs unidirectionally from east to west. Boundary Street serves as its complement by providing a nearby route which runs from west to east.

== Prince Edward Road East ==
Prince Edward Road East is a road between Kowloon City and San Po Kong. It was originally the Sai Kung Road and later part of the Clear Water Bay Road. It later became part of the Prince Edward Road. In 1979, it became the Prince Edward Road East.

The modern Prince Edward Road East starts from Choi Hung Interchange, where it meets Clear Water Bay Road to the northeast and Kwun Tong Road to the southeast. Then it goes west along the boundary between San Po Kong and the retired Kai Tak Airport, and finally ends at Olympic Garden in Kowloon City, where it branches into three roads, Ma Tau Chung Road, Argyle Street and Prince Edward Road West.

Prince Edward Road East was once misspelled as "Princess Edward Road East" by MTR Corporation in the map describing Sha Tin to Central Link (from Diamond Hill station to Kai Tak).

== Notable places along the road ==
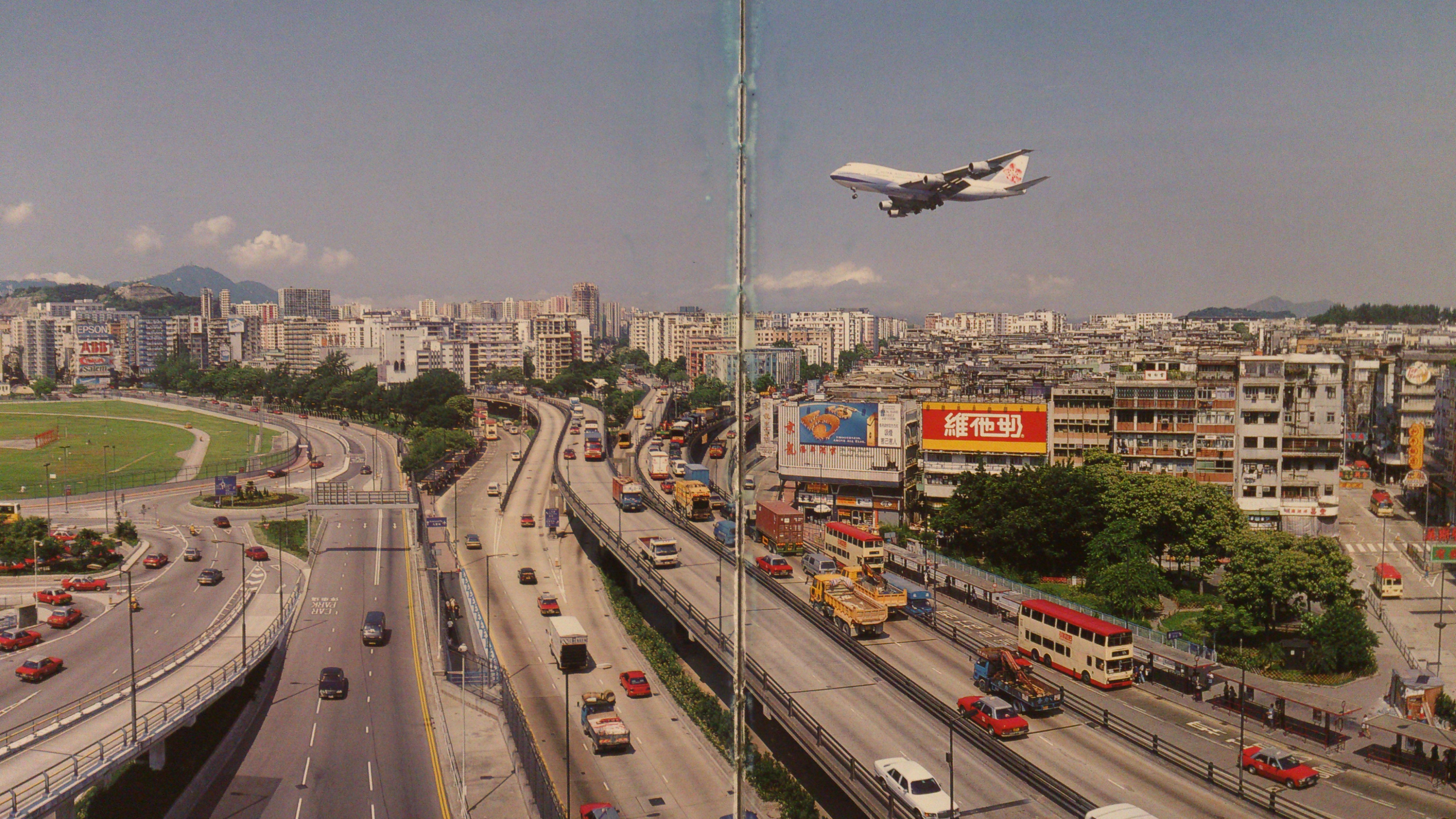
Kai Tak Airport was next to Prince Edward Road

- Diocesan Boys' School
- Mong Kok Stadium
- Kowloon Hospital
- St. Teresa's Church (#258)
- St. Teresa's Hospital (#327)
- Olympic Garden
- Former Kai Tak Airport
- Prince Edward station
- Mikiki
- Kowloon Walled City, demolished in the 1990s

== Events ==
On 9 May 2005, a dozen stacks of shelving on a construction site next to the road fell off due to adverse weather conditions. The relevant section of the road was closed, leading to a severe disruption of traffic among East Kowloon, and affecting more than 100,000 people.

== See also ==
- Prince Edward, Hong Kong
- List of streets and roads in Hong Kong
