= Argyle Street, Hong Kong =

Major road in Hong Kong

Coordinates: 22.32037°N 114.17586°E

Argyle Street
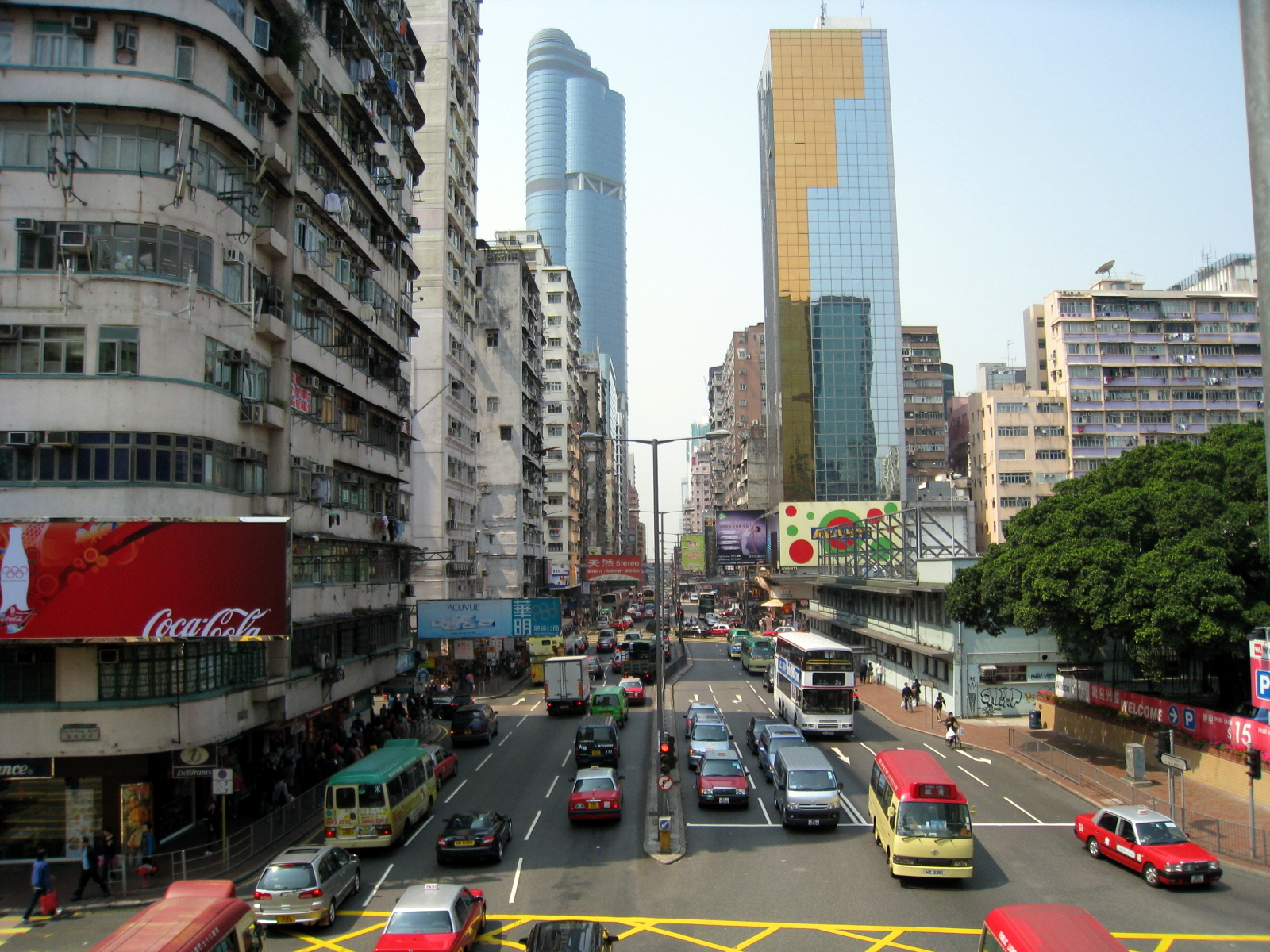
- View of Argyle Street near Mong Kok East station
- Interactive map of Argyle Street
- Native name: 亞皆老街 (Yue Chinese)
- Namesake: Merchant ship Argyle
- Location: Kowloon, Hong Kong
- East end: Prince Edward Road East
- West end: Ferry Street / Cherry Street / Tong Mi Road

Argyle Street
- Traditional Chinese: 亞皆老街
- Simplified Chinese: 亚皆老街
- Cantonese Yale: Agāailóuh gāai
Transcriptions
Standard Mandarin
- Hanyu Pinyin: Yàjiēlǎo jiē
- Wade–Giles: Ya^{4}-chieh^{1}-lao^{3} chieh^{1}
- IPA: [jâ.tɕjé.làʊ tɕjé]
Yue: Cantonese
- Yale Romanization: Agāailóuh gāai
- Jyutping: aa3 gaai1 lou5 gaai1
- IPA: [a˧.kaj˥.lɔw˩˧ kaj˥]

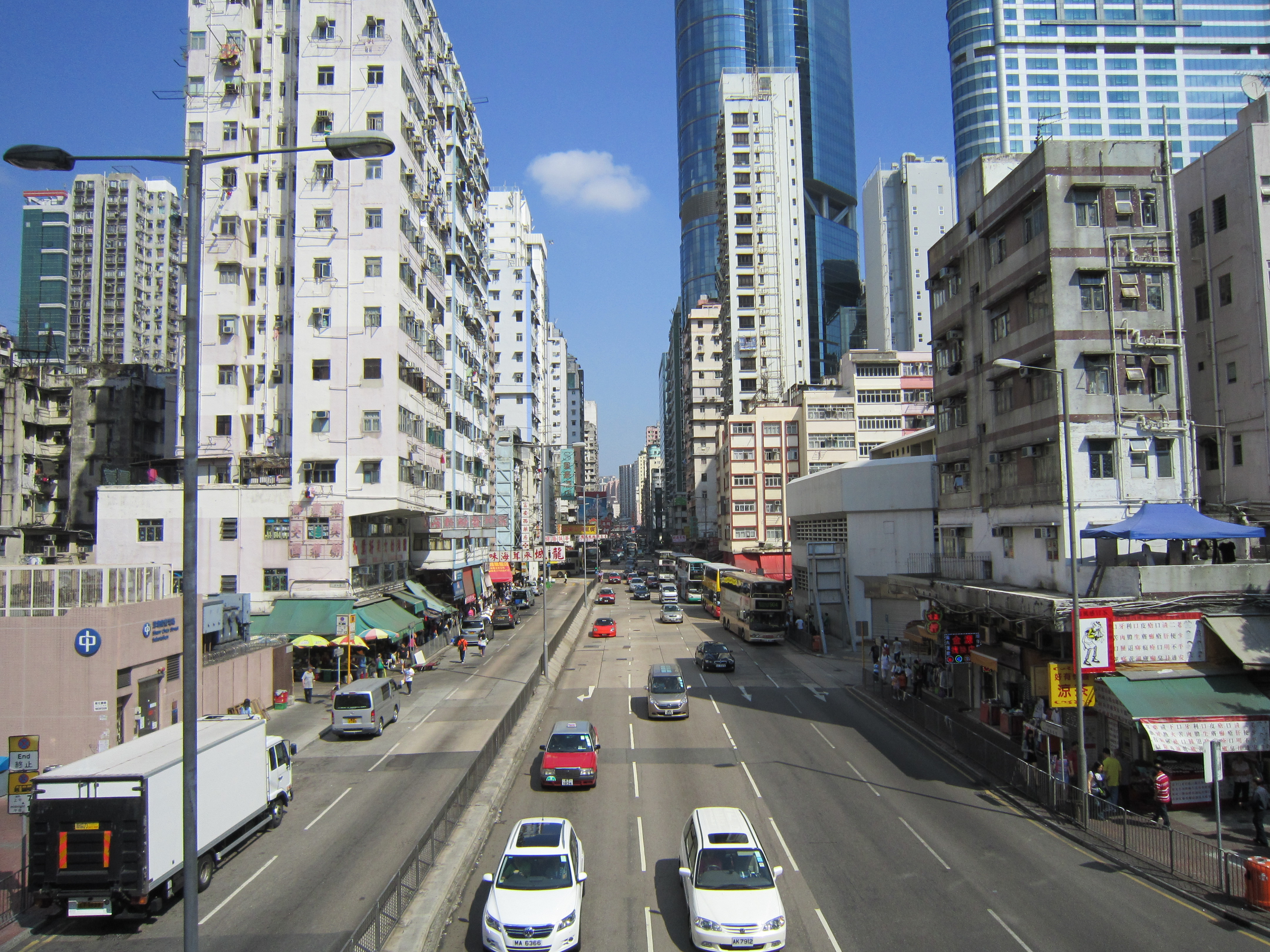
Western end of Argyle Street, looking east

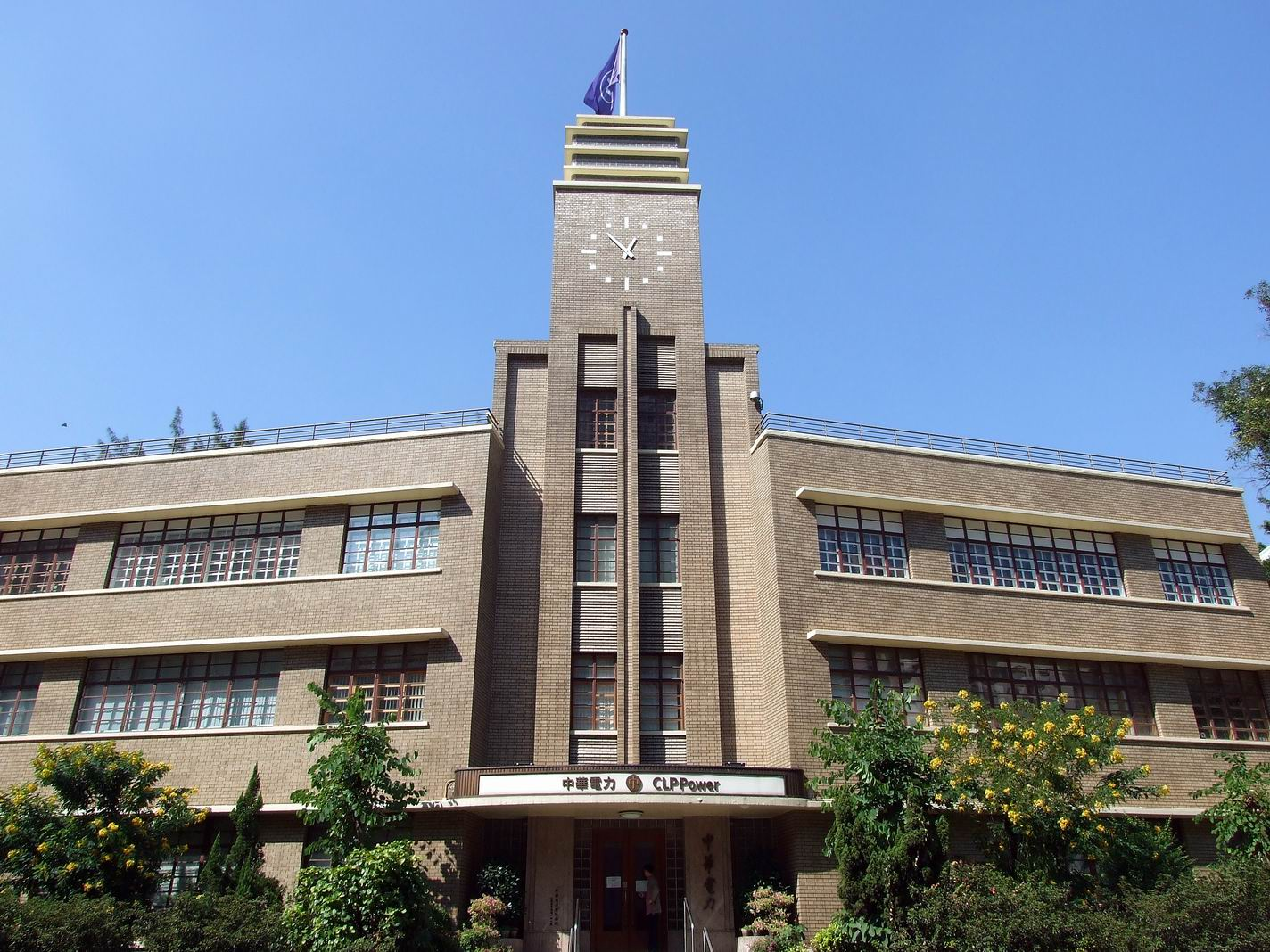
CLP Group Headquarters along Argyle Street

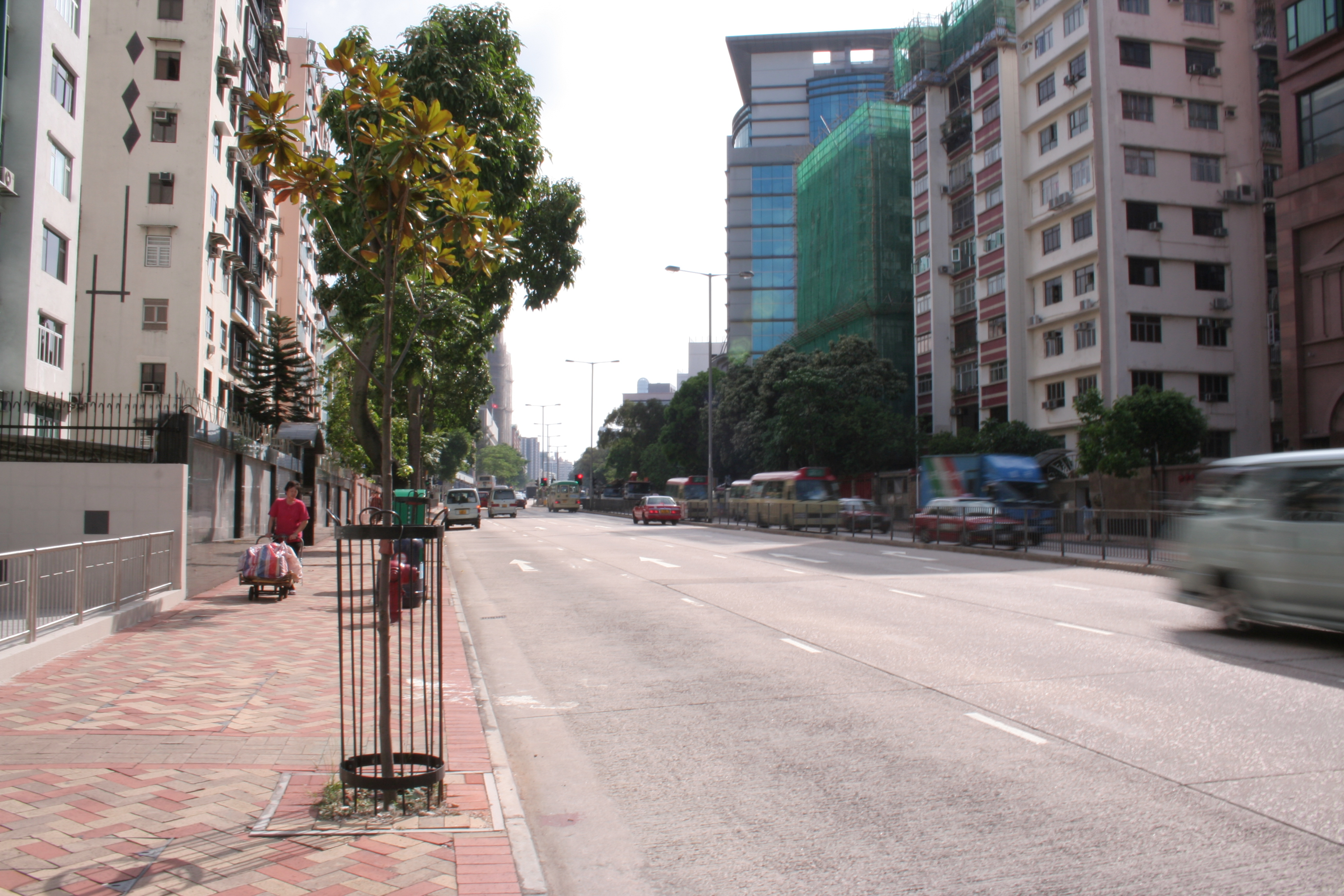
A view of Argyle Street near Kowloon City

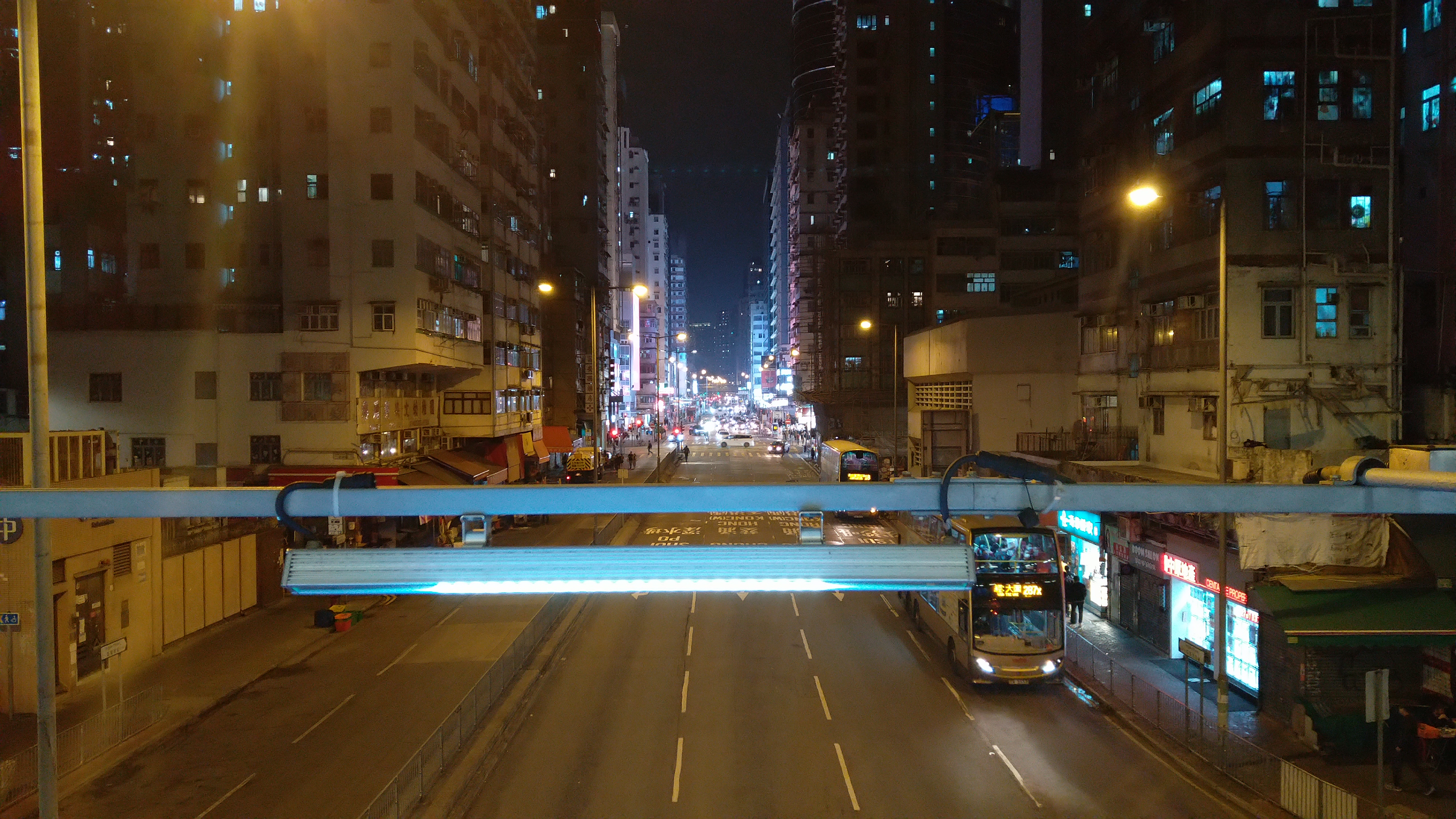
Overlooking Argyle Street from the footbridge at the intersection with Tong Mi Road

Argyle Street (Chinese: 亞皆老街; Jyutping: aa3 gaai1 lou5 gaai1) is a four-lane dual-way thoroughfare in Kowloon, Hong Kong, connecting the districts of Mong Kok, Ho Man Tin, Ma Tau Wai and Kowloon City. It runs on an east–west alignment starting at its intersection with Cherry Street, Ferry Street and Tong Mi Road in the west, and ending near the former Kai Tak Airport in the east. Due to the street's proximity with the latter, a variety of aircraft could be seen from this street and thus photographers (and movie makers) seized the opportunity to capture landing aircraft.

The street was named after a British merchant ship called Argyle, which sailed between India and southern China in the early 19th century.

== Features ==
Amenities and buildings along the street include the Kowloon City Law Courts, the Kowloon Hospital, the Hong Kong Eye Hospital, the headquarters of the Hospital Authority, and the Kowloon West Police Headquarters.

Langham Place opened in 2005 is situated near the west end of the street.

== Landmarks ==
- Langham Place
- Sincere Podium (Sin Tat Plaza)
- Argyle Street Waterworks Depot (demolished in 2019)
- Argyle Street Playground
- Mong Kok East station
- Diocesan Boys' School
- CLP Pulse (Former CLP Headquarters)
- Kowloon Hospital
- Hong Kong Eye Hospital
- Kowloon City Magistrates' Courts
- Olympic Garden

== Transportation ==
=== Mong Kok traffic control since the 1970s ===
As the MTR was constructed in the 1970s, certain exits of Mong Kok Station occupied the right lanes of Argyle Street from Sai Yeung Choi Street to Portland Street. Consequently, the government implemented a control in effect, allowing vehicles to travel only westbound on Argyle Street between these two streets. As a result, vehicles from Tai Kok Tsui via Argyle Street, eastbound towards Kowloon City, should make a left turn onto Reclamation Street and then a right onto Mong Kok Road. After crossing the junction between Mong Kok Road and Nathan Road, one shall turn right to either Sai Yeung Choi Street or Sai Yee Street in order to lead back to Argyle Street. For the same reason, all vehicles are not allowed to make a right turn directly from Nathan Road to Argyle Street, and must follow the route described above. With a large number of buses and minivans passing through this section daily, these intersections have frequently encountered accidents and problems of traffic congestion. There have been plans to correct this, but they are still in discussion.

=== MTR ===
The MTR's Mong Kok station is located mainly under the intersection of Argyle Street and Nathan Road, and the East Rail line's Mong Kok East station is located several blocks to the east, near the street's intersection with Luen Wan Street (聯運街), adjoined with MOKO.

=== Kai Tak Airport ===
The old Kai Tak Airport was near the eastern end of Argyle Street.

== Intersecting streets ==
Roads are listed West to East.

- Cherry Street – continuation westward
- Tong Mi Road (north) and Ferry Street (south)
- Canton Road
- Reclamation Street
- Shanghai Street
- Hong Lok Street – north side only
- Portland Street
- Nathan Road – Mong Kok station is under this intersection.
- Sai Yeung Choi Street South
- Tung Choi Street
- Fa Yuen Street
- Sai Yee Street
- Hak Po Street – south side only
- Luen Wan Street and Yim Po Fong Street
- Kadoorie Avenue – north side
- Victory Avenue – south side
- Soares Avenue – south side
- Waterloo Road and Princess Margaret Road
- Gullane Road – south side
- Tin Kwong Road – south side
- Lomond Road – north side
- Forfar Road (north) and Fu Ning Road (south)
- Stirling Road – north side
- Prince Edward Road West and Ma Tau Chung Road – merge
- Prince Edward Road East – continuation eastward

== See also ==
- Argyle Street Camp
- List of streets and roads in Hong Kong
