= Sin Tat Plaza =

Shopping mall in Hong Kong

Coordinates: 22.31973°N 114.17075°E

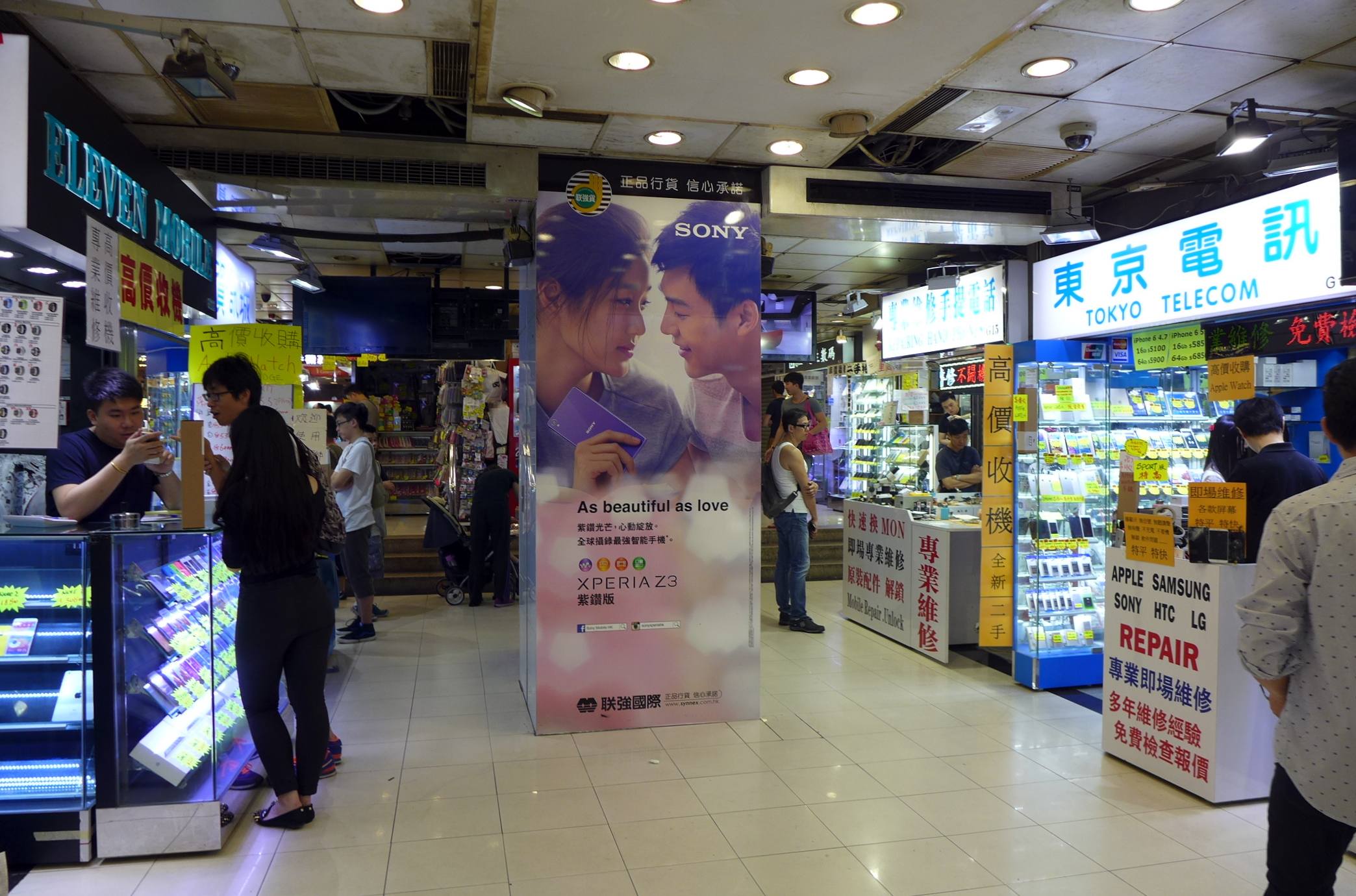
Interior in 2015

Sin Tat Plaza (Chinese: 先達廣場; Jyutping: sin1 daat6 gwong2 coeng4) is a shopping mall located in Sincere Building, 83 Argyle Street, Mong Kok, Hong Kong. Shops focus on the sales of mobile phones, mobile phone accessories, mobile phone repair services, and digital products.

The mall is three floors of typical small booth-style shops, common to Hong Kong. The aisles are narrow, with goods on display. The shops are mostly oriented towards mobile phones, new and used, and repair of such phones. There are also a few gaming and collectable figure shops on the second and third floor, and at least one adult-oriented shop.

The mall is also known as Sincere Podium, and nearby bus stops are named after it.
