= Tong Mi Road =

Throughfare in Yau Ma Tei, Hong Kong

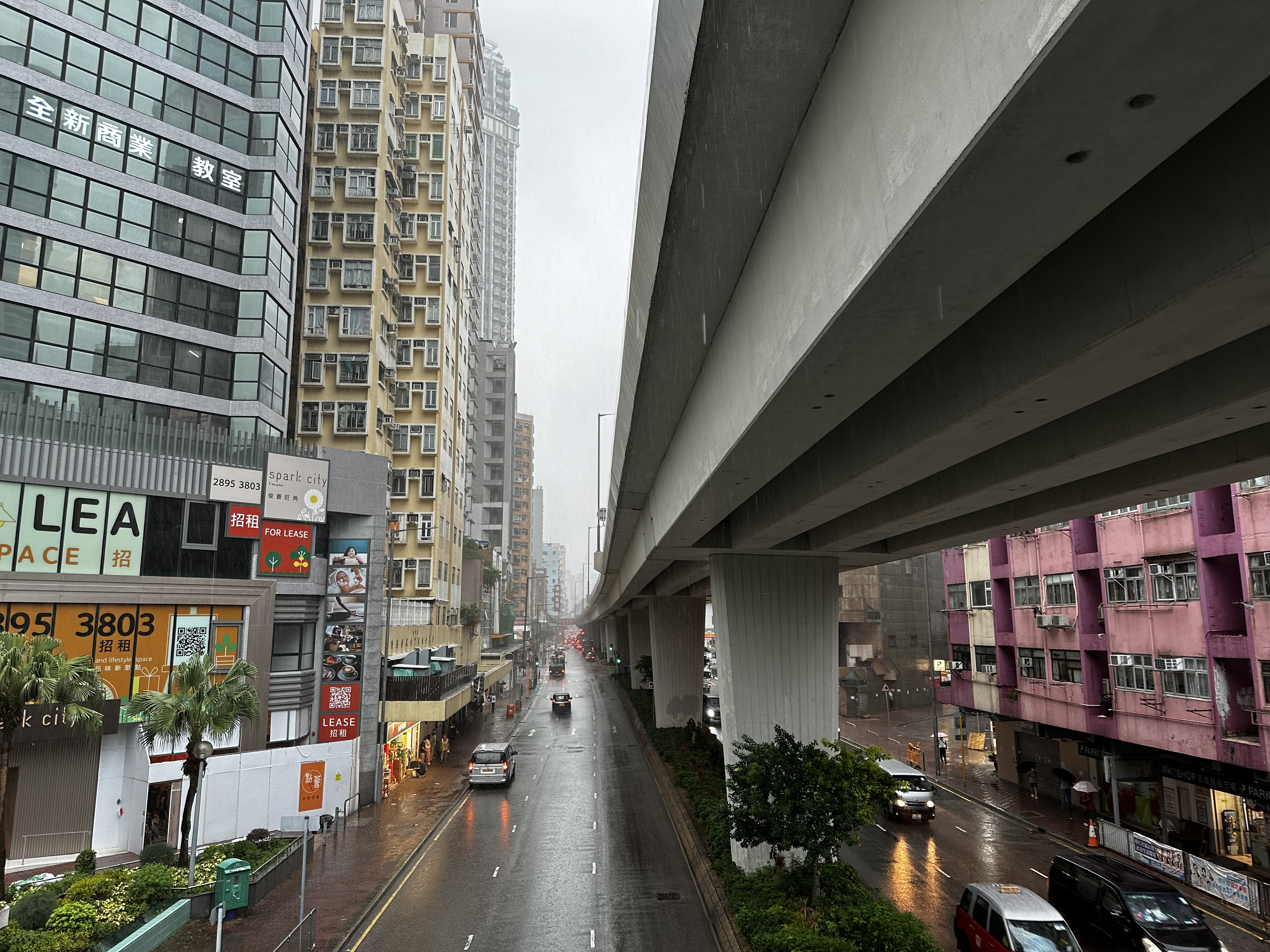
- Tong Mi Road on Olympic Bridge, facing north
- Interactive map of Tong Mi Road
- Native name: 塘尾道 (Yue Chinese)
- Part of: Route 5
- Namesake: Tong Mi Village (塘尾村) 塘尾
- Length: 0.75 km (0.47 mi)
- Location: Hong Kong
- Coordinates: 22.32162°N 114.16551°E
- South end: Ferry Street, Cherry Street and Argyle Street
- North end: Lai Chi Kok Road and Poplar Street

Construction
- Construction start: 28 September 1923
- Completion: Latest by 1935

Tong Mi Road
- Traditional Chinese: 塘尾道
Transcriptions
Standard Mandarin
- Hanyu Pinyin: Tángwěi Dào
Yue: Cantonese
- Jyutping: tong4 mei2 dou3

Tong Mi Road (Chinese: 塘尾道) is a throughfare running north–south through Sham Shui Po, Mong Kok and Yau Ma Tei in Hong Kong. It is a major road housing the southbound branch of the West Kowloon Corridor above it, making it one of the busiest roads in Kowloon. This road is commonly viewed as the border between Tai Kok Tsui and Mong Kok.

== History ==
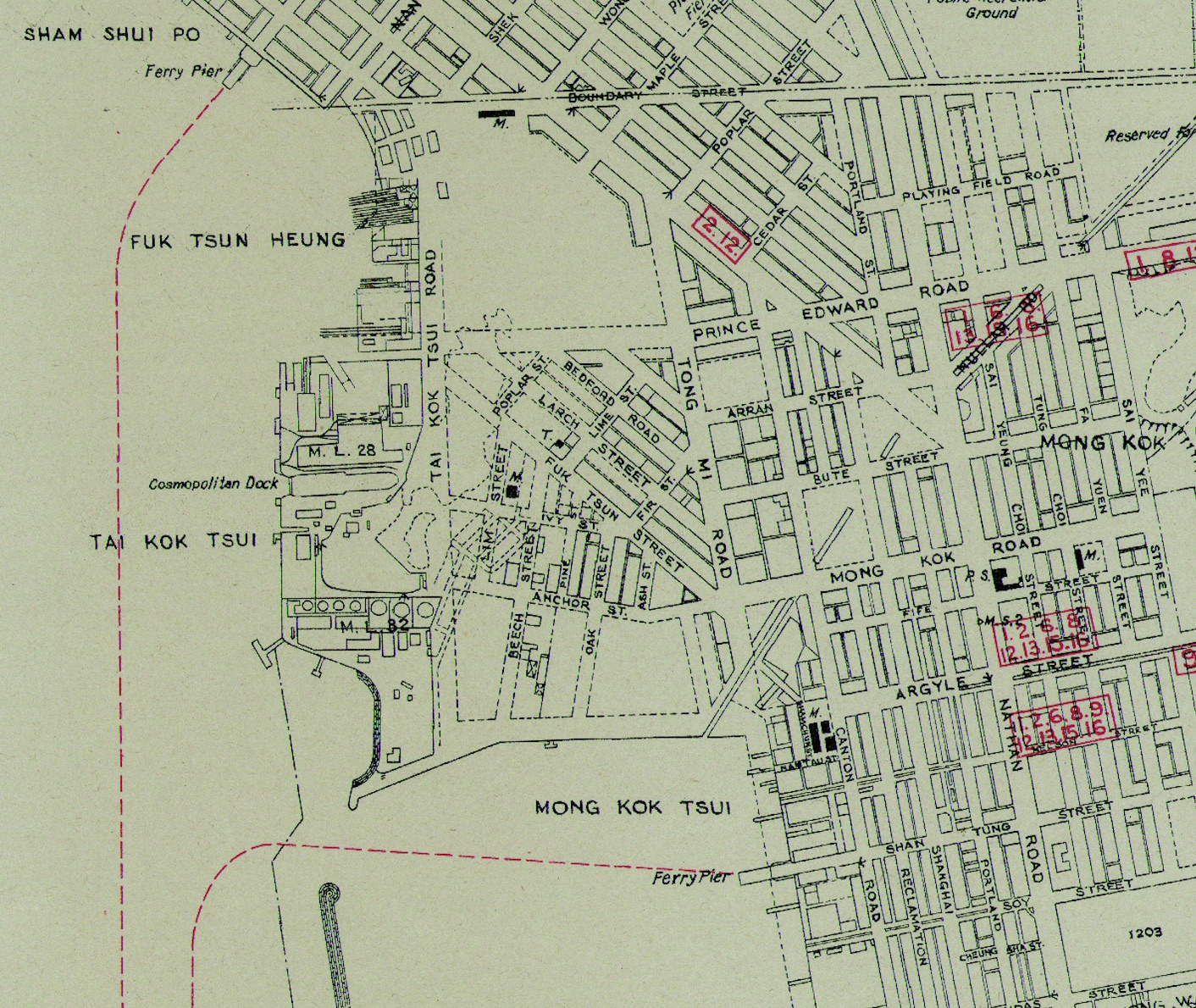
Tai Kok Tsui in 1947

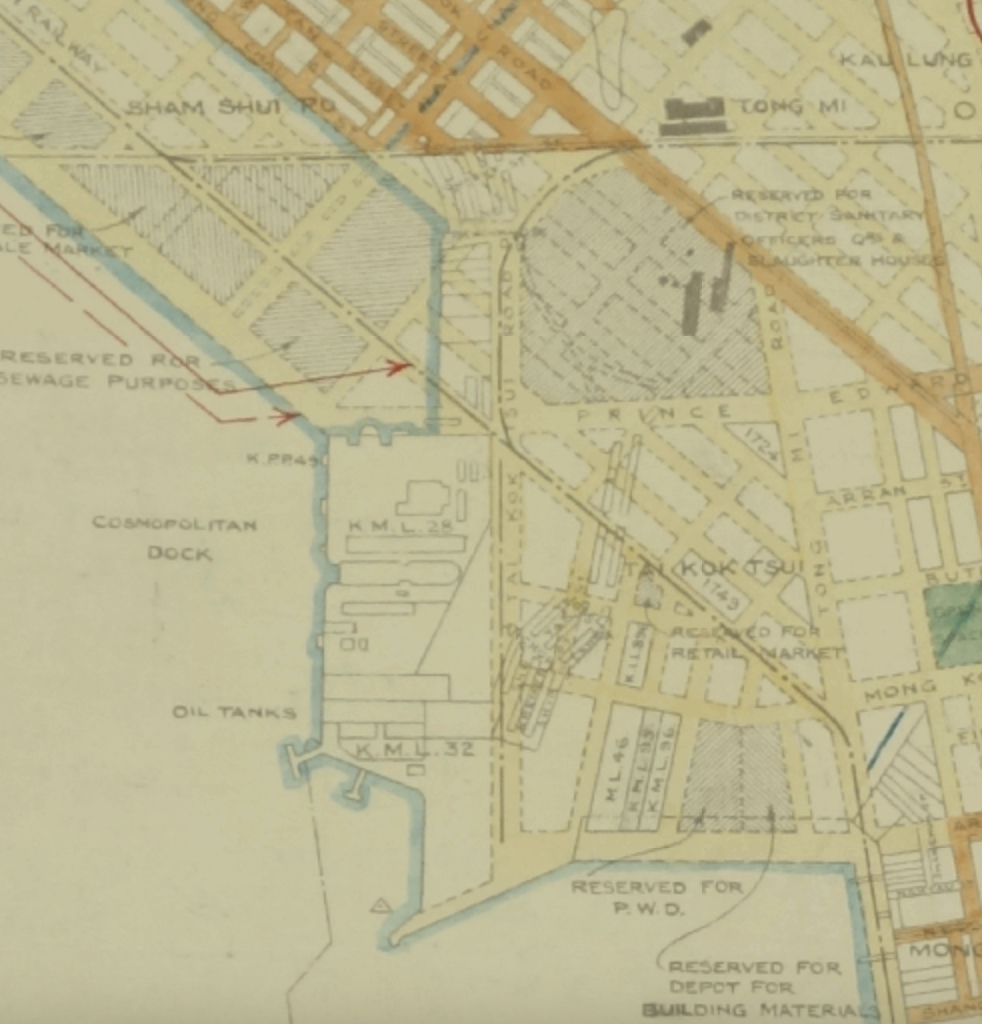
Tong Mi Road in 1926 as shown in the development plan. Light Yellow is under planning.

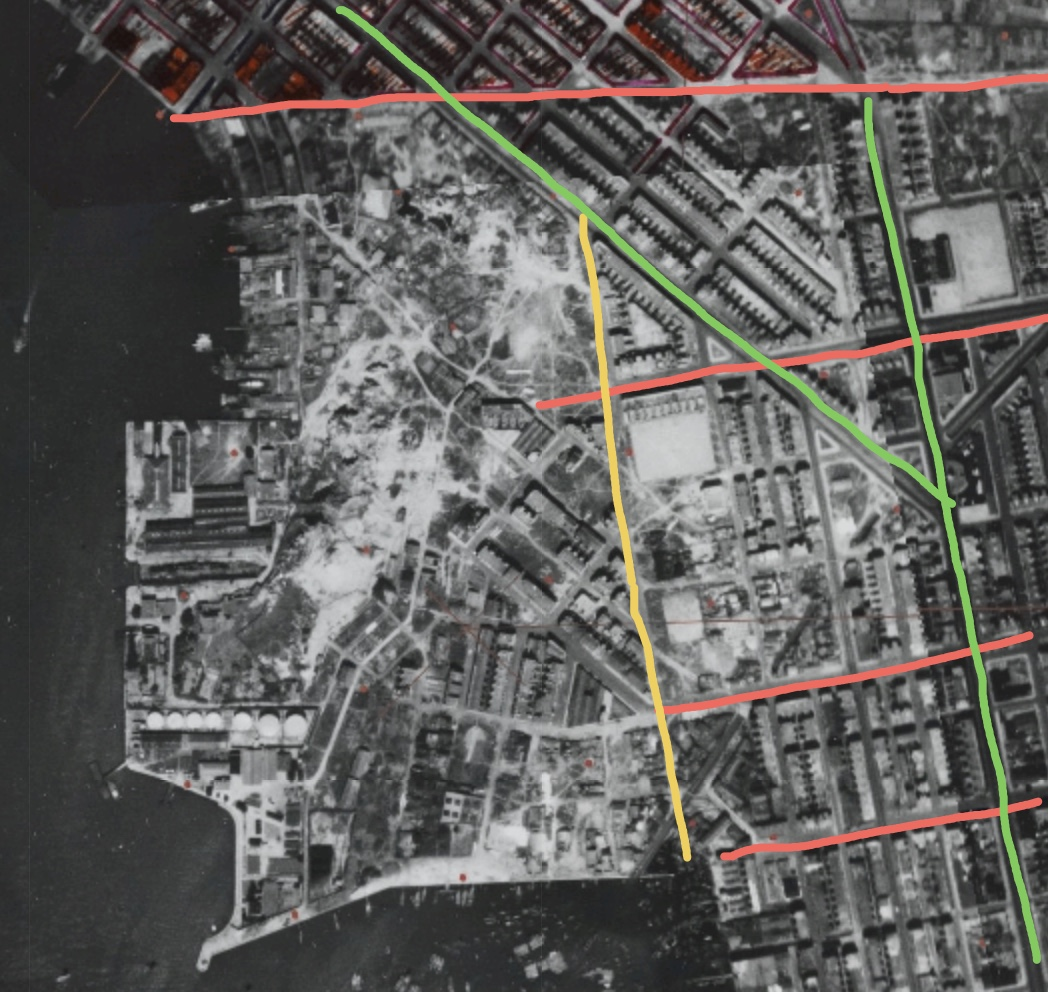
Tong Mi Road in 1934. Yellow: Tong Mi Road. Red from top to bottom: Boundary Street, Prince Edward Road, Mong Kok Road, Argyle Street. Green from left to right: Lai Chi Kok Road, Nathan Road.

Before the building of this road, this was part of Tong Mi Village, documented in maps as late as 1928. The new planned road was named in a Government Gazette on 28 Sep 1923:

Road beginning at its junction with Argyle Street and running in a northerly direction and terminating at its junction with Lai Chi Kok Road, being immediately west of Canton Road ... Tong Mi Road 塘 尾 道

— No. 411, Hong Kong Government Gazette, 28 September 1923,

This was also seen in a Map of Development in 1926. By 1934, the Village was demolished, and Tong Mi Road was able to be seen on aerial photos. It extended from Lai Chi Kok Road to Argyle Street, right at the north-eastern corner of the Yau Ma Tei Typhoon Shelter.

In 1983, the section of the West Kowloon Corridor over Tong Mi Road was completed, connecting Ferry Street with Tung Chau Street. During the 1990s West Kowloon Reclamations, the original Yau Ma Tei Typhoon Shelter was filled and reclaimed into today's Olympic. In 2020, The length of the road was adjusted by decree of the Land Department, prolonging Tong Mi Road to the intersection with Nelson Street.

== Traffic ==
The road has been plagued by congestion for those entering the West Kowloon Corridor and the Cross-Harbour Tunnel. The government has tried to relieve this issue with the Central Kowloon Route, which will provide another route towards Hong Kong Island.

The intersection to Argyle Street is known as a traffic blacksite, with more than 9 traffic accidents each year in the years of 2022 and 2023.

== Intersecting streets ==
Roads are listed North to South.

- Lai Chi Kok Road and Poplar Street
- Prince Edward Road West
- Tung Chau Street and Arran Street
- Fir Street and Bedford Road
- Bute Street
- Larch Street
- Mong Kok Road, Fuk Tsun Street and Anchor Street
- Cherry Street and Argyle Street
- Ferry Street and Nelson Street

== See also ==
- Yaumatei Ferry Pier
- Sham Shui Po
- Mong Kok
- Yau Ma Tei
- West Kowloon Corridor
- Ferry Street
- List of streets and roads in Hong Kong
