= Kowloon City =

Neighbourhood in Hong Kong

Coordinates: 22°19′50″N 114°11′24″E

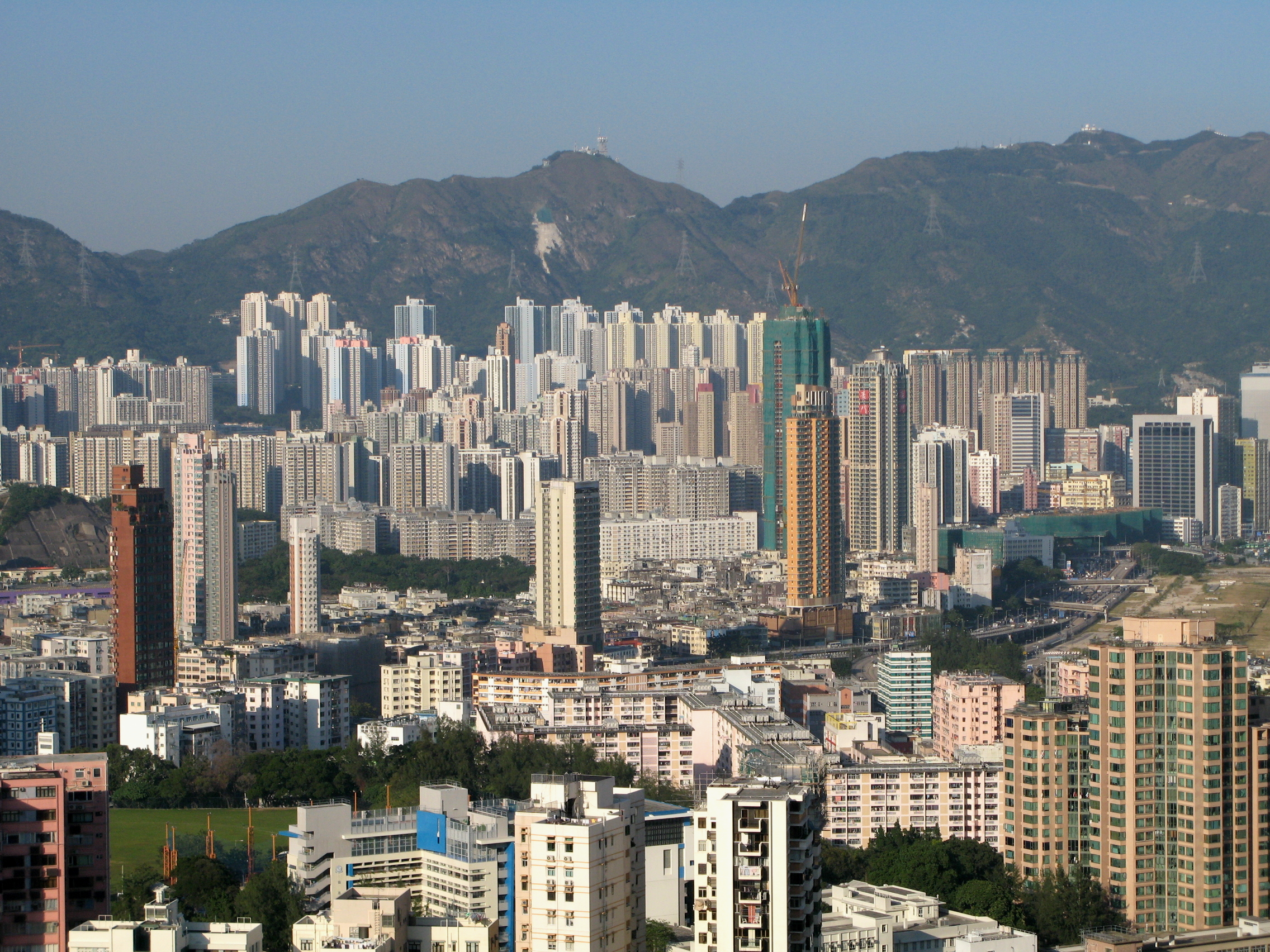
- High-rise buildings have been built in Kowloon City after the relocation of the Hong Kong International Airport from Kowloon City to Chek Lap Kok.
- Traditional Chinese: 九龍城
- Simplified Chinese: 九龙城
Transcriptions
Standard Mandarin
- Hanyu Pinyin: Jiǔlóngchéng
Yue: Cantonese
- Yale Romanization: Gáu lùhng sìhng
- Jyutping: Gau^{2} lung^{4} sing^{4}

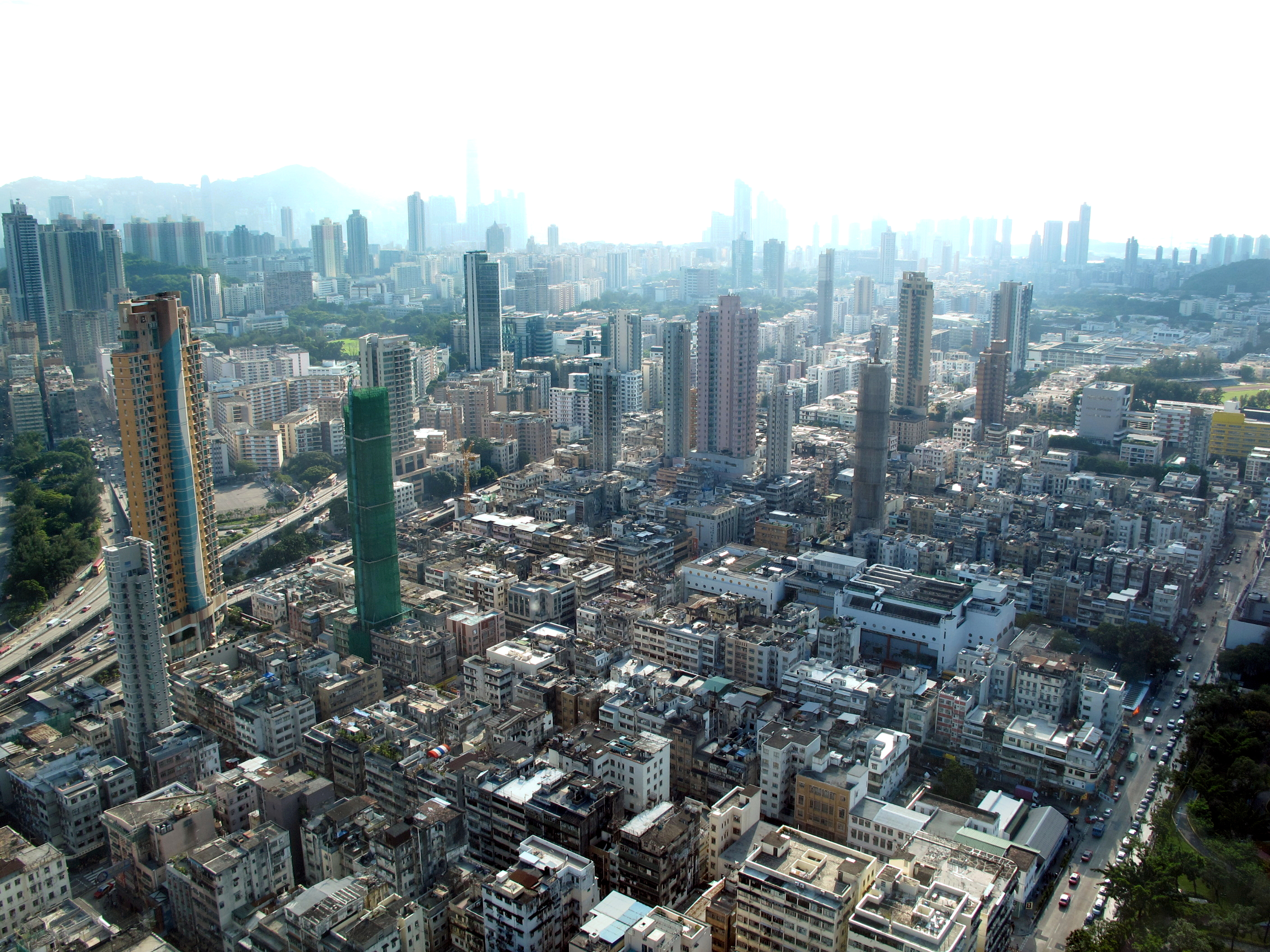
Aerial view of Kowloon City

Kowloon City is an area in New Kowloon, Hong Kong. It is part of Kowloon City District.

Compared with the council area of Kowloon City District, the Kowloon City area is vaguely bounded in the south by Prince Edward Road West and Prince Edward Road East, north with Lok Fu, east with Kai Tak Nullah and west with Kowloon Tsai.

== History ==
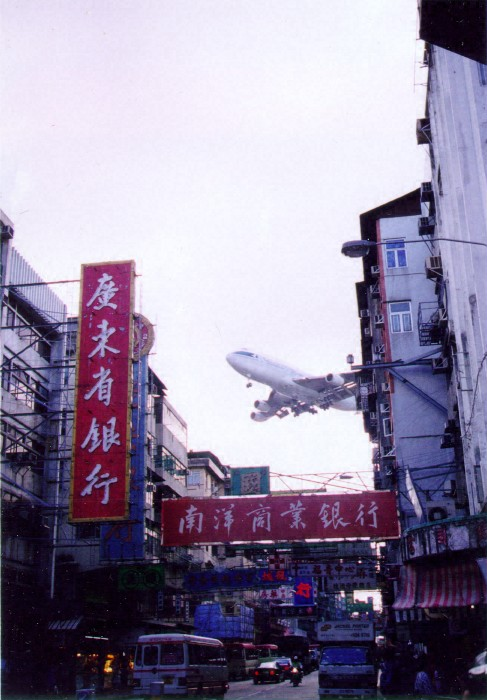
Low-flying aircraft were a common sight in Kowloon City before the relocation of Hong Kong's airport

During the Song dynasty (960–1279), Kowloon City was a part of Kwun Fu Cheung (traditional Chinese: 官富場; simplified Chinese: 官富场; pinyin: guān fù chǎng), which was part of a salt yard governed by Chinese officials. During the late Song Dynasty, two young emperors, Zhao Bing and Duanzong, sought refuge at current day Kowloon City, roughly at present day Sung Wong Toi Garden, to escape from the growing Mongol Army. There are also historic relics and a temple which dates back to 800 years ago.

Part of the area was the location of the original Kowloon Walled City, erected during the Qing dynasty. This is now Kowloon Walled City Park. The former Kai Tak International Airport was also located in the district.

In 1982, Hong Kong was divided into 18 districts, and Kowloon City and its neighbouring areas, such as Hung Hom, have been part of the Kowloon City District since then.

Prior to 1998, a strict building height restriction was imposed in Kowloon City and over much of Kowloon to minimise the hazards of air traffic commuting through the Kai Tak Airport. The closure of Kai Tak as a result of the opening of the new Chek Lap Kok Airport lifted the height restriction and more high-rise apartments started to appear, with heights of up to 175 m (574 ft).

In more recent years, rapid gentrification has taken place and new residential skyscrapers have replaced old tong laus. However, zoning plans have described some of these recent high-rise developments as undesirable and proposed a height limit of 80 m (260 ft) for new buildings in Kowloon City.

== Nearby sights ==
- The passenger terminal of Kai Tak Airport, a defunct airport
- Kai Tak Sports Park
- Kowloon City Plaza
- Kowloon City's public market – one of the largest wet markets in Hong Kong
- Kowloon Walled City
- Holy Trinity Cathedral, (Note: These locations are part of Kowloon City District, but some sources stated that they are not part of the Kowloon City proper.) the oldest church in Kowloon
- Sung Wong Toi Garden
- Hau Wong Temple

== Features ==
Kowloon City is an old district in Hong Kong; however, it has been transforming into a modern district with a lot of new shops and restaurants over the years. The district is well known for its wide range of cuisine. Other than the traditional Hong Kong-style restaurants that offer local dishes, there are numerous restaurants that offer Southeast Asian dishes like Thai, Vietnamese and Indonesian.

Many Thai grocery stores can be found throughout Kowloon as well. Due to the prevalence of Thai restaurants and stores as well as the population of Thai-speaking ethnic Chinese, Kowloon City is also known as "Hong Kong's Little Thailand". It is not only a food paradise for authentic main dishes of many cultures, but also a popular place for both traditional Hong Kong-style and western desserts. With a sizeable population from the Chiushan area of Guangdong Province, Kowloon City is also famous for Chiuchow-style braised dishes (滷水).

== Transport ==
Major roads that serves the area definitely include:

- Boundary Street
- Argyle Street
- Prince Edward Road

Kowloon City is served by Sung Wong Toi station of the Tuen Ma line.

== Demographics ==
In 2016, about 33% of the Thai people living in Hong Kong resided in Kowloon City. Accordingly, there is a concentration of Thai businesses there. Proposed redevelopment in 2022 threatened the Thai businesses.

== Education ==
Schools in Kowloon City include:

Pooi To Primary School, Diocesan Preparatory School, La Salle Primary School, Holy Family Canossian School, and Canossa Primary School.

Kowloon City is in Primary One Admission (POA) School Net 41. Within the school net are multiple aided schools (operated independently but funded with government money) and Kowloon Tong Government Primary School.

Hong Kong Public Libraries maintains the Kowloon City Public Library in the Kowloon City Municipal Services Building.

== See also ==
- List of places in Hong Kong
- Kowloon Tong
