= Ferry Street, Hong Kong =

Throughfare in Yau Ma Tei, Hong Kong

Ferry Street
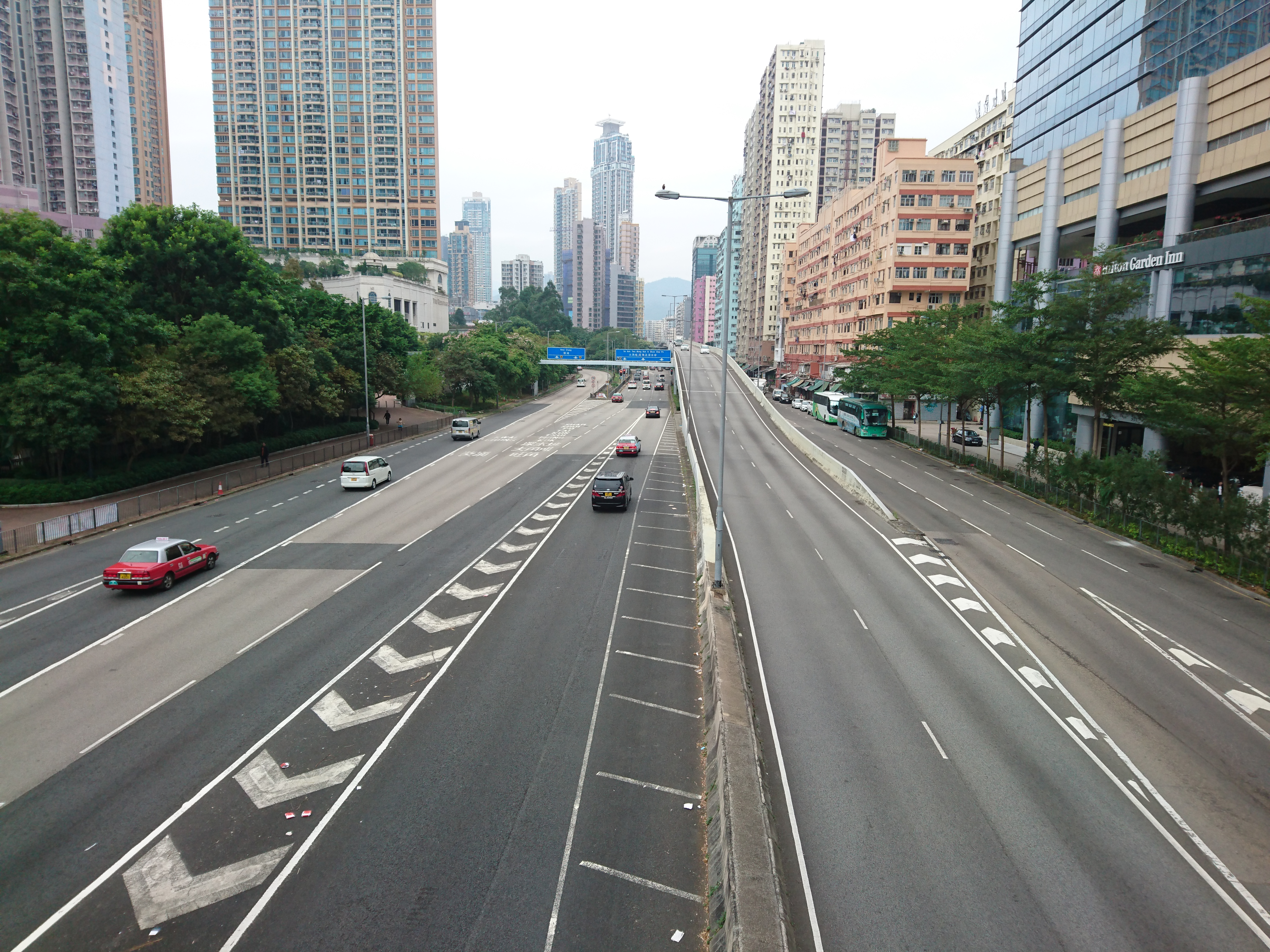
- Intersection of Ferry Street and Cherry Street, facing north
- Interactive map of Ferry Street
- Native name: 渡船街 (Yue Chinese)
- Part of: Route 5
- Namesake: Old Ferry Piers to its west
- Length: 1.31 km (0.81 mi)
- Location: Hong Kong
- Coordinates: 22.311752°N 114.1671°E
- South end: Jordan Road and Canton Road
- North end: Tong Mi Road and Argyle Street

Construction
- Completion: 1930s

Ferry Street, Hong Kong
- Traditional Chinese: 渡船街
Transcriptions
Standard Mandarin
- Hanyu Pinyin: Dùchuán jiē
Yue: Cantonese
- Jyutping: dou3 suen4 gai1

Ferry Street (Chinese: 渡船街) is a throughfare running north–south through Mong Kok, Yau Ma Tei, and Jordan in Hong Kong. It is a major road housing the West Kowloon Corridor above it, making it one of the busiest roads in Kowloon. Before the start of land reclamation in the 1990s, this road marked the coast of West Kowloon, and most piers were built on this road, hence the name.

== History ==
Before Ferry Street was built, the land was part of the sea. Land for the road was reclaimed in the early stages of land reclamation of West Kowloon. The road was built in the 1930s, and the name of Ferry Street was finalized by the government in 1947. It directly faced the Yau Ma Tei Typhoon Shelter to the west, until the next phase of reclamation in the 1990s removed its access to the sea.

== Traffic ==
The road has been plagued by congestion for those entering the West Kowloon Corridor and the Cross-Harbour Tunnel. A bottleneck on Gascoigne Road towards the entrance of the tunnel can cause traffic jams towards Ferry Street. The government has tried to relieve this issue with the Central Kowloon Route, which will provide another route towards Hong Kong Island.

== Intersecting streets ==
Roads are listed North to South. Unless otherwise stated, all roads intersect Ferry Street only on the east side. T = Through W = West

- Cherry Street (W), Tong Mi Road (north) and Argyle Street (east)
- Nelson Street
- Shantung Street
- Soy Street
- Dundas Street
- Lee Yip Street
- Pitt Street
- Waterloo Road (T)
- Public Square Street
- Yan Cheung Street (W) and Kansu Street
- Man Cheong Street (W) and Saigon Street
- Man Wai Street (W)
- Man Yuen Street (W)
- Man Ying Street (W)
- Man Wui Street (W)
- Jordan Road (T)

== See also ==
- Yaumatei Ferry Pier
- Jordan, Hong Kong
- List of streets and roads in Hong Kong
