= West Kowloon Corridor =

Trunk road in Kowloon, Hong Kong

Coordinates: 22.3207°N 114.1628°E

West Kowloon Corridor
- Part of Route 5
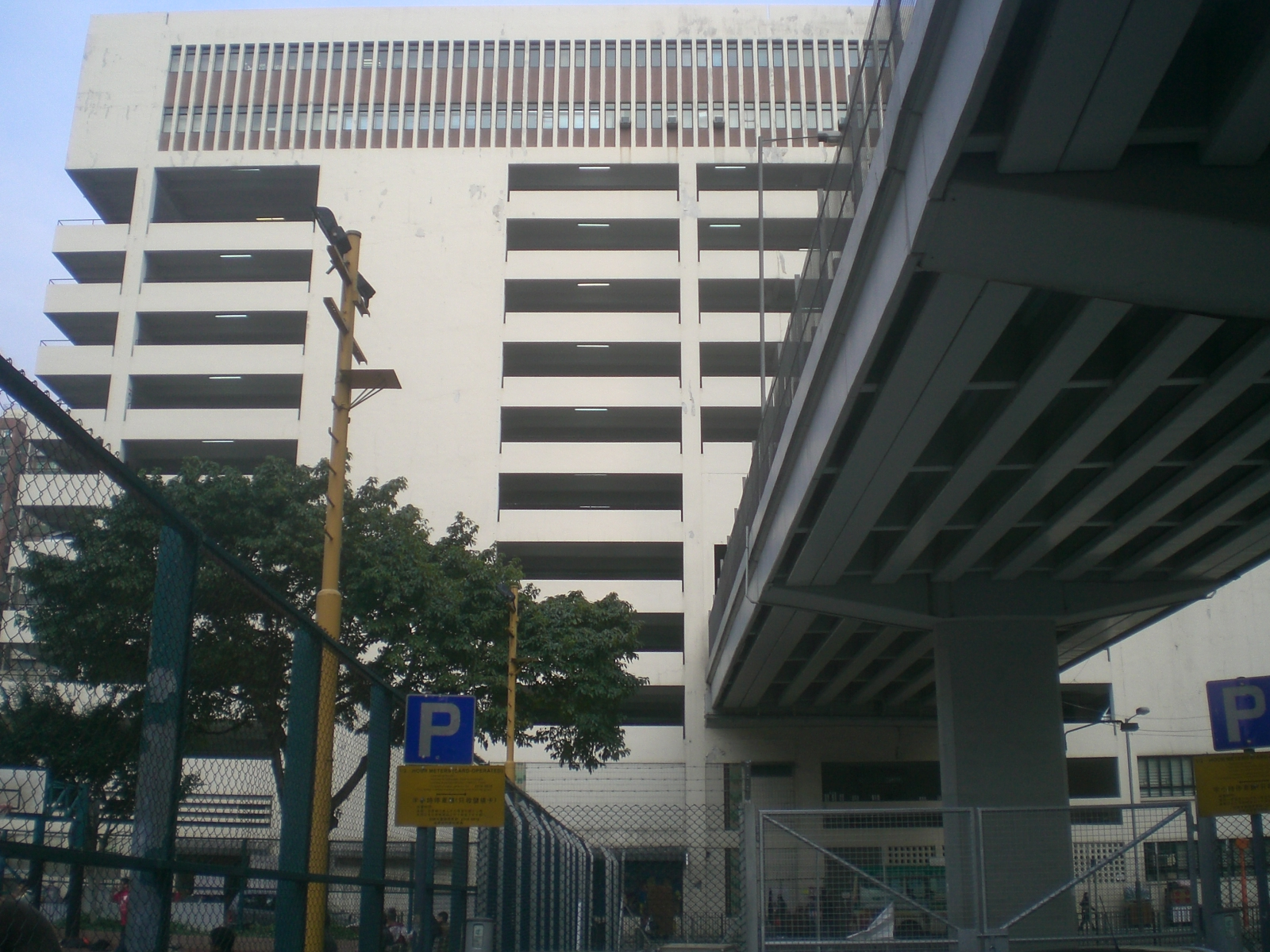
- An overhead viaduct carries route 5 through the Yau Ma Tei Car Park Building in Yau Ma Tei

Route information
- Maintained by Highways Department
- Length: 3.75 km (2.33 mi)
- Existed: 1977–present

Major junctions
- Northwest end: Lai Chi Kok Road
- Southeast end: Chatham Road South / Princess Margaret Road

Location
- Country: China
- Special administrative region: Hong Kong

Highway system
- Transport in Hong Kong; Routes; Roads and Streets

West Kowloon Corridor
- Traditional Chinese: 西九龍走廊
- Simplified Chinese: 西九龙走廊
Transcriptions
Standard Mandarin
- Hanyu Pinyin: Xī Jiǔlóng Zǒuláng
Yue: Cantonese
- Yale Romanization: sai1 gau2 lung4 jau2 long4
- Jyutping: sai1 gau2 lung4 zau2 long4*2

West Kowloon Corridor is part of Route 5 in Hong Kong. Bypassing existing surface roads in West Kowloon, it connects Lai Chi Kok Road in Cheung Sha Wan with the Gascoigne Road Flyover near Yau Ma Tei.

The highway was built in 4 phases:

- Phase 1 (1977) consists of a flyover 1.2 km (0.75 mi) long, linking Gascoigne Road and Ferry Street. This section is characterised by the section of road going through Yaumatei Carpark Building.
- Phase 2 (1983) includes flyovers between Cherry Street in Tai Kok Tsui and Yen Chow Street in Sham Shui Po. It runs on separate viaducts in each direction: southbound traffic goes over Tung Chau Street and Tong Mi Road, while northbound traffic goes over Cherry Street and Tai Kok Tsui Road before merging over Tung Chau Street.
- Phase 3 (1987) carries on over Tung Chau Street to meet Lai Chi Kok Road in Cheung Sha Wan.
- Phase 4 was completed in 1997, connecting the flyovers of phases 1 and 2.

To make way for the new Fu Cheong Estate, the off-slips at the old terminus on Yen Chow Street were demolished; they have yet to be replaced.

Many red public minibus routes which serve between New Territories West (Yuen Long, Tuen Mun, Tsuen Wan or Kwai Chung) and Kowloon South (Mong Kok or Jordan Road) or Hong Kong Island are routed via West Kowloon Corridor so as to provide faster routes to Mong Kok, Yau Ma Tei and Jordan to avoid traffic congestion in Sham Shui Po.

Preceded by Chatham Road North	Hong Kong Route 5 West Kowloon Corridor	Succeeded by Lai Chi Kok Road
