= Sai Yeung Choi Street =

Street in Kowloon, Hong Kong

Coordinates: 22.32195°N 114.16944°E

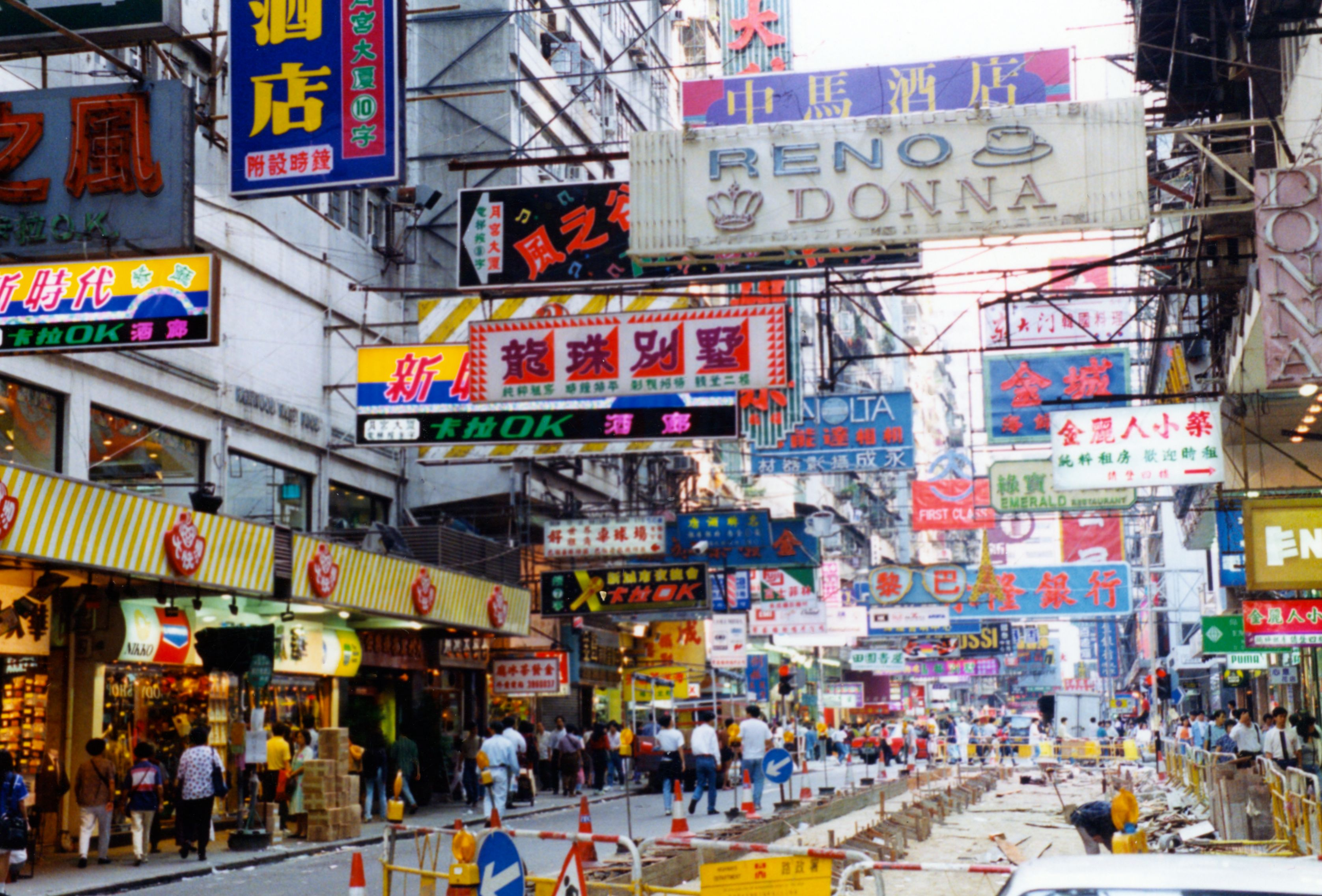
- Sai Yeung Choi Street South in 1993
- Interactive map of Sai Yeung Choi Street
- Native name: 西洋菜街 (Chinese)
- Maintained by: Highways Department
- Location: Mong Kok, Kowloon; Hong Kong

Sai Yeung Choi Street
- Chinese: 西洋菜街
- Cantonese Yale: sāi yèuhng choi gāai
Transcriptions
Yue: Cantonese
- Yale Romanization: sāi yèuhng choi gāai
- Jyutping: sai1 joeng4 coi3 gaai1

Sai Yeung Choi Street (Chinese: 西洋菜街) are two streets in Mong Kok, Kowloon, Hong Kong, namely, Sai Yeung Choi Street South (西洋菜南街) and Sai Yeung Choi Street North (西洋菜北街). Although officially two streets, local people seldom make distinction between them. They are separated by the Mong Kok Police Station. Sai Yeung Choi Street South is a popular hotspot for shopping and a tourist attraction.

== History ==
The streets were built on watercress cultivation in a village, Mong Kok Tsuen (旺角村), in Mong Kok in 1924, hence its name. As time went by, the village and fields were replaced by high-rise buildings. When the police station was built, the street was separated into two sections. In the late 1970s the Postmaster General suggested renaming the streets, appending "south" and "north", to reduce confusion. On 12 January 1979, the streets were renamed.

In the 1970s, some buildings on Sai Yeung Choi Street were demolished to make way for construction of the Mass Transit Railway.

Sai Yeung Choi Street has been the site of several criminal acts of objects and fluids being thrown from buildings. On 13 December 2008, two bottles of corrosive liquid were hurled from buildings, burning 46 people. On 16 May 2009, two bottles of corrosive liquid were thrown, injuring 30 people. The police increased the award for information leading to an arrest, while the Yau Tsim Mong District Council installed a CCTV system to help catch the perpetrator. A third acid attack occurred on 8 June 2009, injuring 24. A similar attack occurred on 9 January 2010 on nearby Temple Street. On 10 June 2014, a pedestrian was killed on Sai Yeung Choi Street after being hit by a swivel chair thrown from a rooftop by a mentally-ill Mainland Chinese who had been drinking.

Sai Yeung Choi Street was a frequent site of demonstrations during the protracted 2014 Hong Kong protests.

== Sai Yeung Choi Street South ==
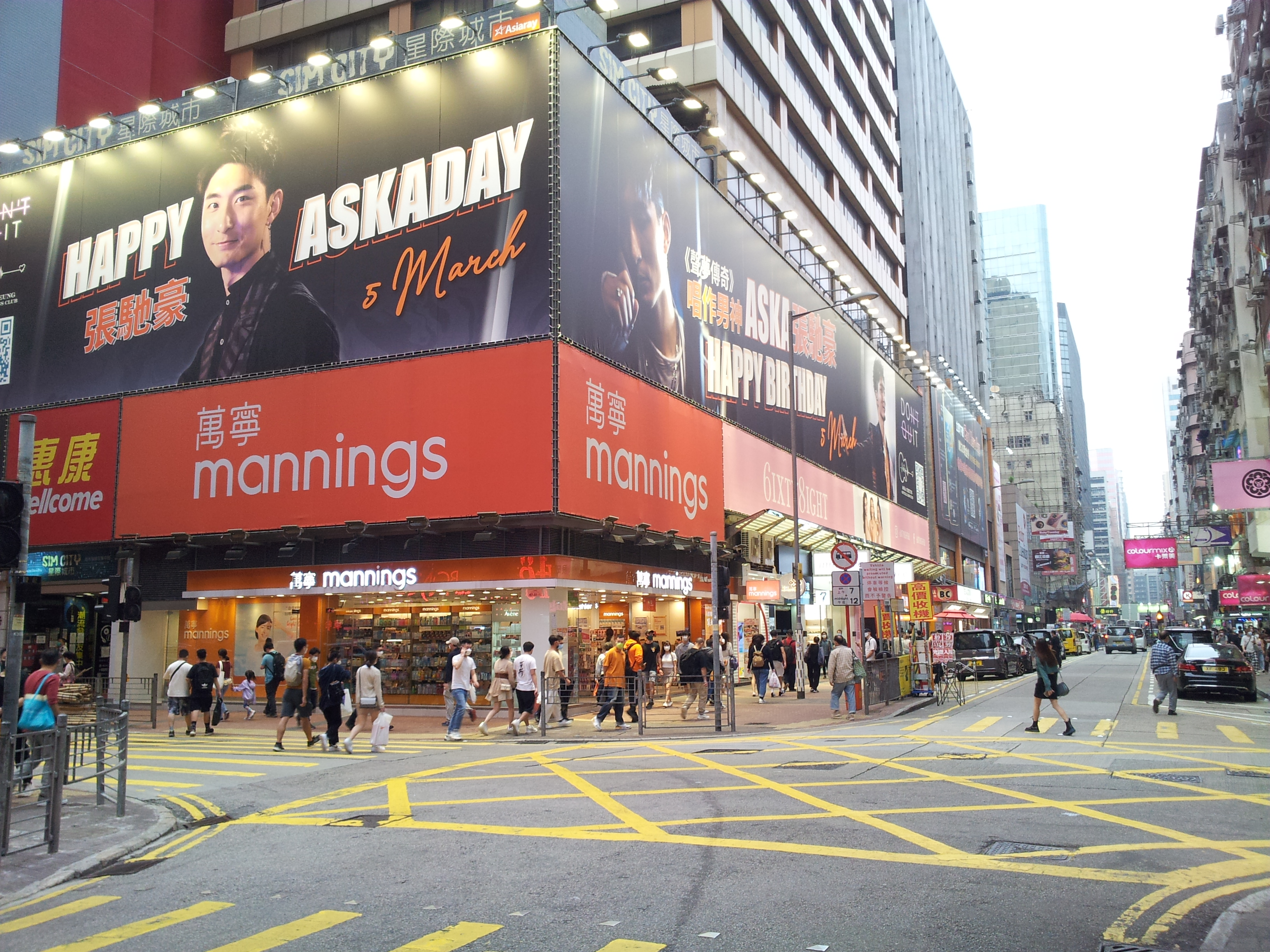
Sai Yeung Choi Street South near its junction with Shantung Street in 2022

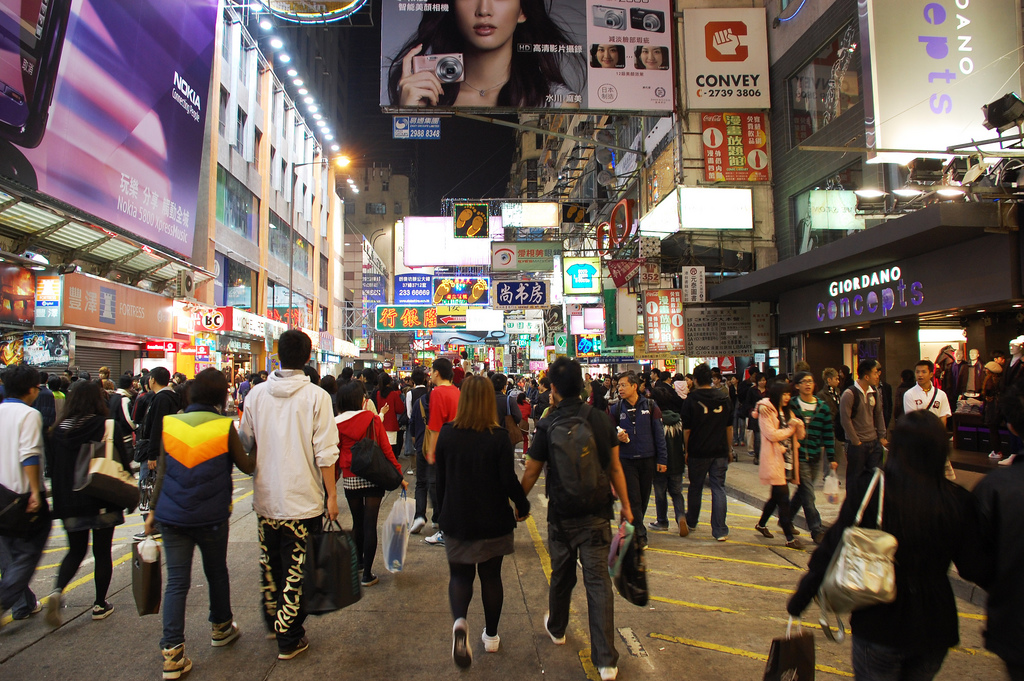
Sai Yeung Choi Street South at night in 2008

Starting from Dundas Street in Yau Ma Tei, it runs north and meets major roads, Argyle Street and Mong Kok Road, and ends at the junction with Prince Edward Road West. This street is a hot spot for Hong Kong people. The section south of Argyle Street concentrates shops of electronic products at street level and upstair bookstores above.

The busiest portion of the street was pedestrianised all week long in 2000. However, the Traffic and Transport Committee of the Yau Tsim Mong District Council voted on 21 November 2013 to restrict the pedestrianisation to weekends and public holidays only, citing complaints from local residents. A survey conducted by the Home Affairs Department found that 80 per cent of residents and shop owners wanted to limit pedestrianisation, while most people questioned on the street wanted to keep the weekday pedestrianisation. In spite of criticism, the pedestrianisation hours were reduced to weekends only with effect from January 2014. The section of the street between Argyle Street and Dundas Street was closed to motorised traffic from 4:00 pm to 10:00 pm on Saturdays, and noon to 10:00 pm on Sundays and public holidays. Retail rents on the street subsequently dropped.

The noise of street performers has increasingly become a point of contention at Sai Yeung Choi Street South, as at certain other locations in Hong Kong (e.g. Tuen Mun Park). As such public singing and dancing is common in mainland Chinese squares and parks, Hong Kong media have called the phenomenon an example of the "mainlandisation" of Hong Kong. The "often-off-key singing blasting from the loudspeakers" is considered excessively loud and lacking in artistic merit. A study commissioned by the Liberal Party found that noise levels on Saturday nights reached 101.5 decibels. In 2017, authorities received more than 1,200 complaints about the performers, who are not managed by any licensing or regulatory system. In response to pressure from residents and businesses, the Yau Tsim Mong District Council voted in May 2018 to temporarily suspend the pedestrianisation scheme, and the pedestrian zone ceased to exist at 10pm on 29 July 2018.

== Sai Yeung Choi Street North ==
Starting from Playing Field Road, it runs north, crossing Boundary Street into New Kowloon and terminates slight beyond Poplar Street. This street is largely residential and more quiet than the other street in the south. A much shorter, separated section of this street is to the north, between Sai Yeung Choi Lane and St. Francis' Church, separated by a hill slope.

== Transportation ==
- Yau Ma Tei station (Exit A2)
- Mong Kok station (Exits B2, B3, D2, D3, E2)
- Prince Edward station (Exits A, B1, B2)

== See also ==
- List of streets and roads in Hong Kong
