= Portland Street =

Street in Kowloon, Hong Kong

Coordinates: 22.31815°N 114.16898°E

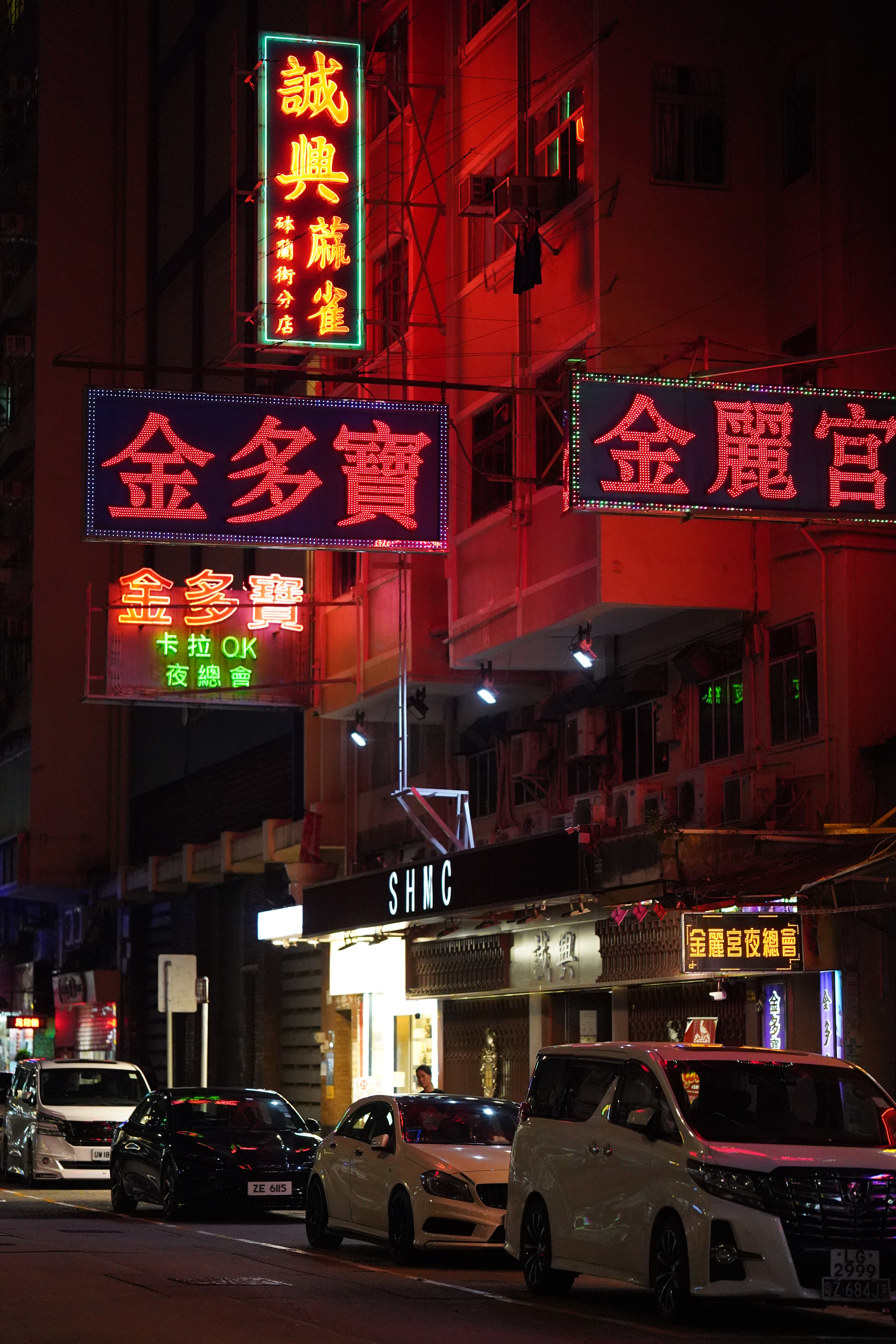
- Neon and LED signs on Portland Street in 2025
- Traditional Chinese: 砵蘭街
- Simplified Chinese: 砵兰街
- Cantonese Yale: Būt làahn gāai
Transcriptions
Standard Mandarin
- Hanyu Pinyin: Bō lán Jiē
- Wade–Giles: Po^{1}-lan^{2} Chieh^{1}
Yue: Cantonese
- Yale Romanization: Būt làahn gāai
- Jyutping: But^{1} laan^{4} gaai^{1}

Portland Street (Chinese: 砵蘭街) is a popular street in Kowloon, Hong Kong. The street is the location of the business and retailing skyscraper complex, Langham Place, numerous restaurants and its red-light district.

== Geography ==
Running north–south and parallel to (and west of) Nathan Road, a main thoroughfare up the Kowloon peninsula, Portland Street extends through the districts of Yau Ma Tei and Mong Kok in Kowloon. Approximately three-quarters of a mile (one and a fifth kilometres) in length, it spans between Boundary Street in the north and Man Ming Lane, at one block past Waterloo Road in the south. The street is directly accessible by the Prince Edward, Mong Kok and Yau Ma Tei stations of the MTR, Hong Kong's subway system.

Except for a few small parks, the entire two-lane street is highly urbanised with dense pedestrian and motor traffic throughout most of the day. Like most north–south streets on the peninsula it is numbered south to north.

== Character ==
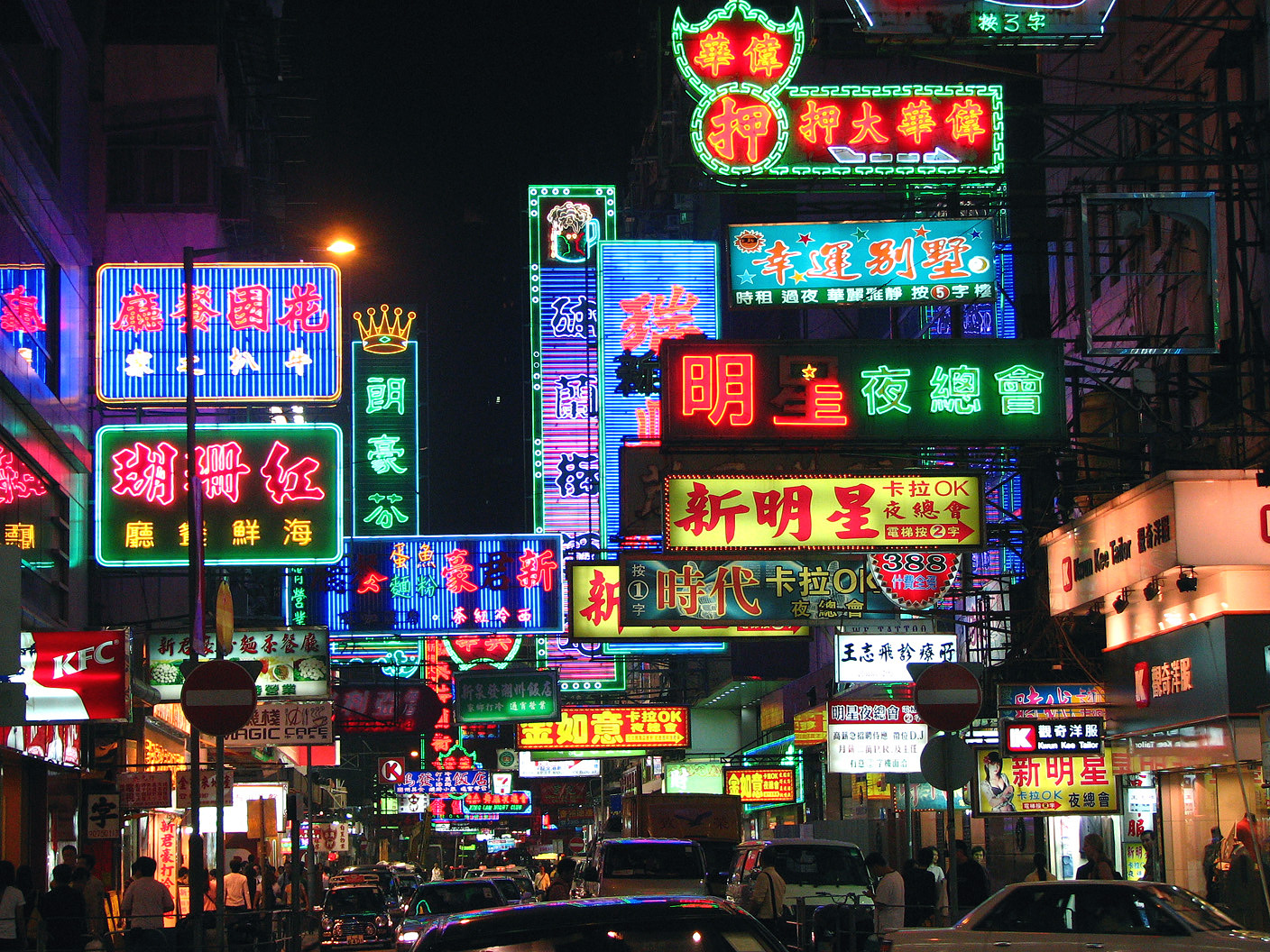
Neon signs in Hong Kong's Portland Street c. 2007. Many of the neon signs which once lined the street have now been removed.

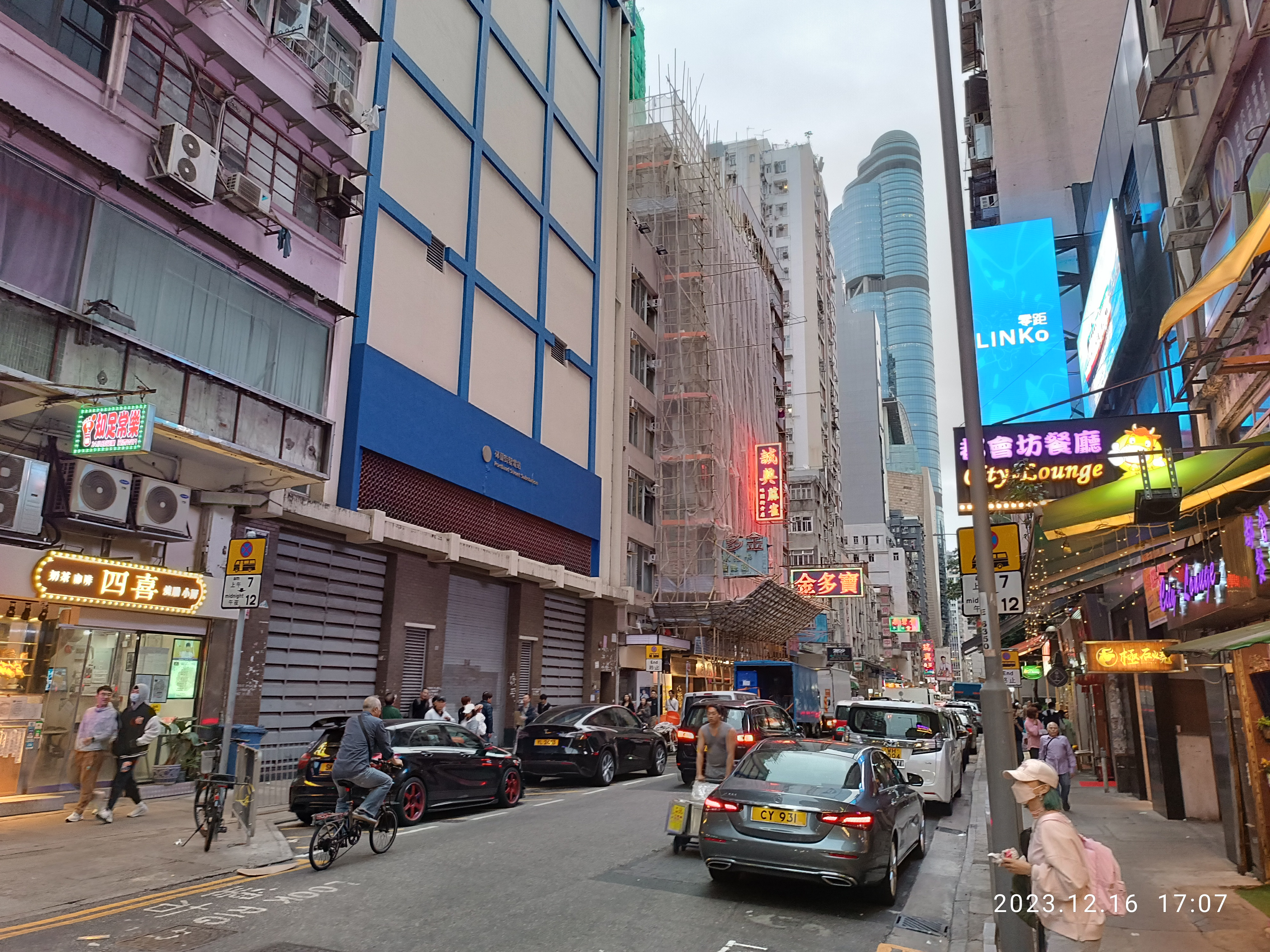
Portland Street in December 2023.

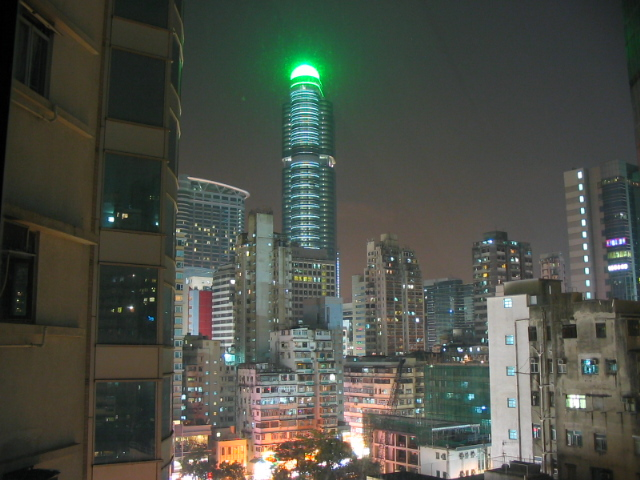
Hotel tower of Langham Place viewed from about 1.6 km (one mile) away. The structure is one of Kowloon's tallest.

A section of Portland Street, particularly between Argyle Street and Dundas Street, hosts arguably Hong Kong's most famous red light district (serving mostly local Chinese clientele) and a popular scene in Hong Kong films. There, one can find prostitutes from around the world (although mostly from mainland China) serving in hundreds of massage parlours, night clubs, karaoke/hostess bars and brothels. Although prostitution is legal in Hong Kong, law enforcement is often active in this area conducting raids for prostitutes who entered Hong Kong illegally or have overstayed their visas or to search for under-aged prostitutes, pimps, human traffickers and triad activities.

Langham Place, a 167,000-square metre (1.8 million-square foot) shopping centre, theatre, hotel and office tower complex opened on Portland Street near the Nelson Street intersection in July 2004. The complex has its own MTR station access (Mong Kok station exit C3). Outside one of the complex's east entrances is a large 'jumbotron' broadcasting news and entertainment shows for pedestrians below. Since its opening, Langham Place and surrounding areas has become a popular night-time destination for both locals and tourists. Some had predicted the massive upscale development would gentrify the area and drive away the Portland Street sex trade. However, after several years of operation, Langham Place's impact on the nearby sex industry remains minimal.

The Portland Street segment between Argyle Street and Bute Street is home to over 50 retailers selling home renovation materials and supplies such as toilet utensils, tiles, and wallpapers.

Other establishments along Portland Street includes fast-food restaurants, congee/noodle shops, convenience stores and working class residential highrises. Near the Soy Street intersection during the evenings, there are often unlicensed food stands and professional Chinese Chess players plying their trades. Further south, there is a small public playground at the Changsha Street intersection.

Portland Street was previously lined with a dizzying array of neon signs, although due to tightening government regulations many of these have now been removed.

== History ==
Portland Street was named after William Cavendish-Bentinck, 3rd Duke of Portland, Prime Minister of the United Kingdom in 1783 and between 1807 and 1809. It is unclear why the street was bestowed in his honour although, as a former British colony, many of Hong Kong's streets and institutions were named in memory of prominent English historic and political figures. Surrounding streets with similarly naming scheme include Pitt Street, Bute Street, Arran Street, Hamilton Street, Dundas Street and Waterloo Road.

There is a street in London named Great Portland Street. There is also a street in Edinburgh named Portland Street which is not far from Pitt Street and Dundas Street (as mentioned above, Hong Kong's Portland Street is also nearby Pitt Street and Dundas Street). In both cases it is not clear if there is any relation or relevance to the Hong Kong Portland Street.

== Transport ==
Mong Kok station Exit C2, C4, E1

== See also ==
- List of streets and roads in Hong Kong
- Portland Street Blues, a 1998 Hong Kong film
- Prostitution in Hong Kong
