= Millennium City, Hong Kong =

Commercial development in Kwun Tong, Hong Kong

Coordinates: 22.313°N 114.221°E

- Traditional Chinese: 創紀之城
- Simplified Chinese: 创纪之城
Transcriptions
Standard Mandarin
- Hanyu Pinyin: Chuàngjì zhī chéng
Yue: Cantonese
- Jyutping: cong3 gei2 zi1 sing4

Millennium City plan

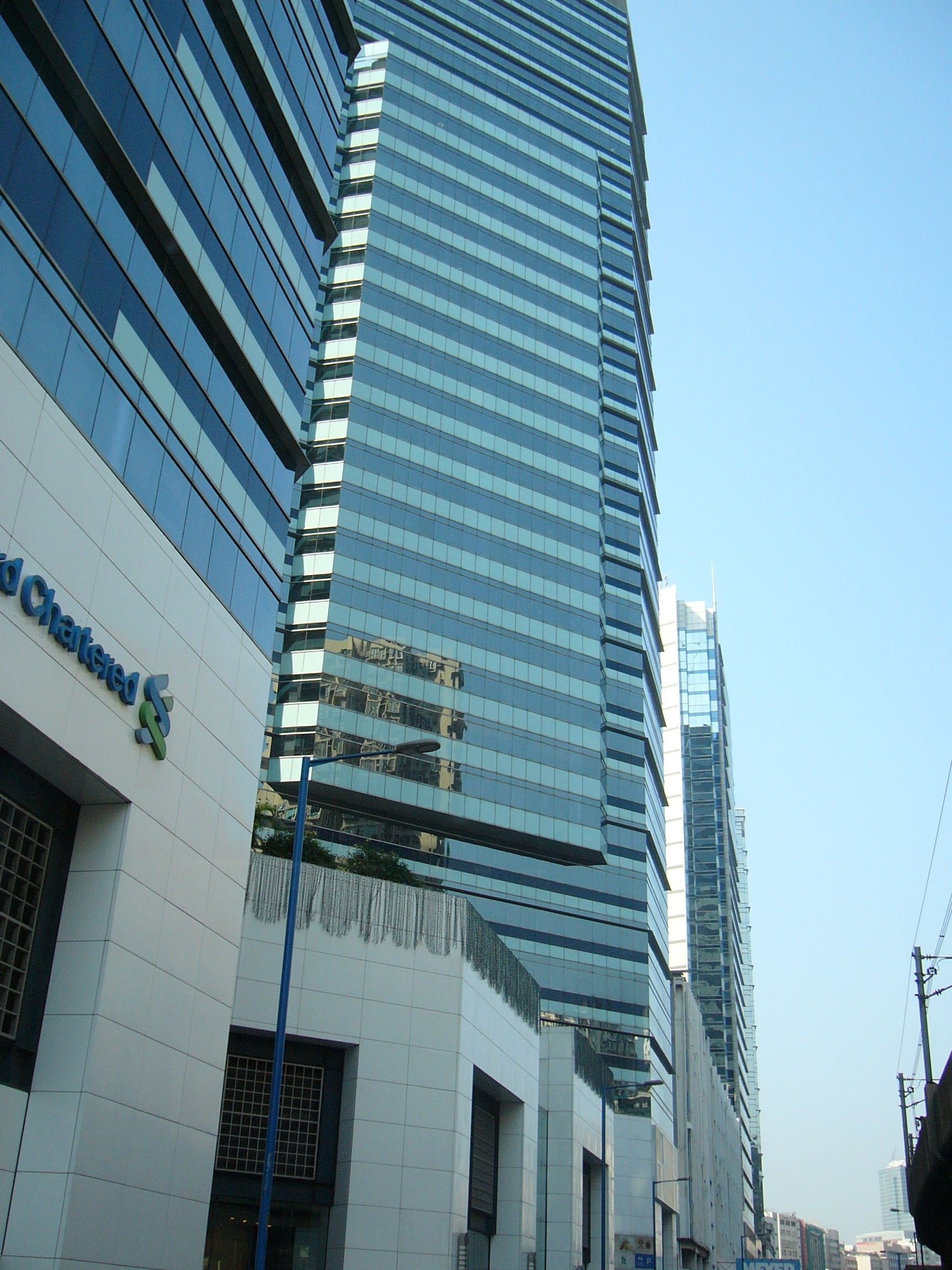
Millennium City 1, 2

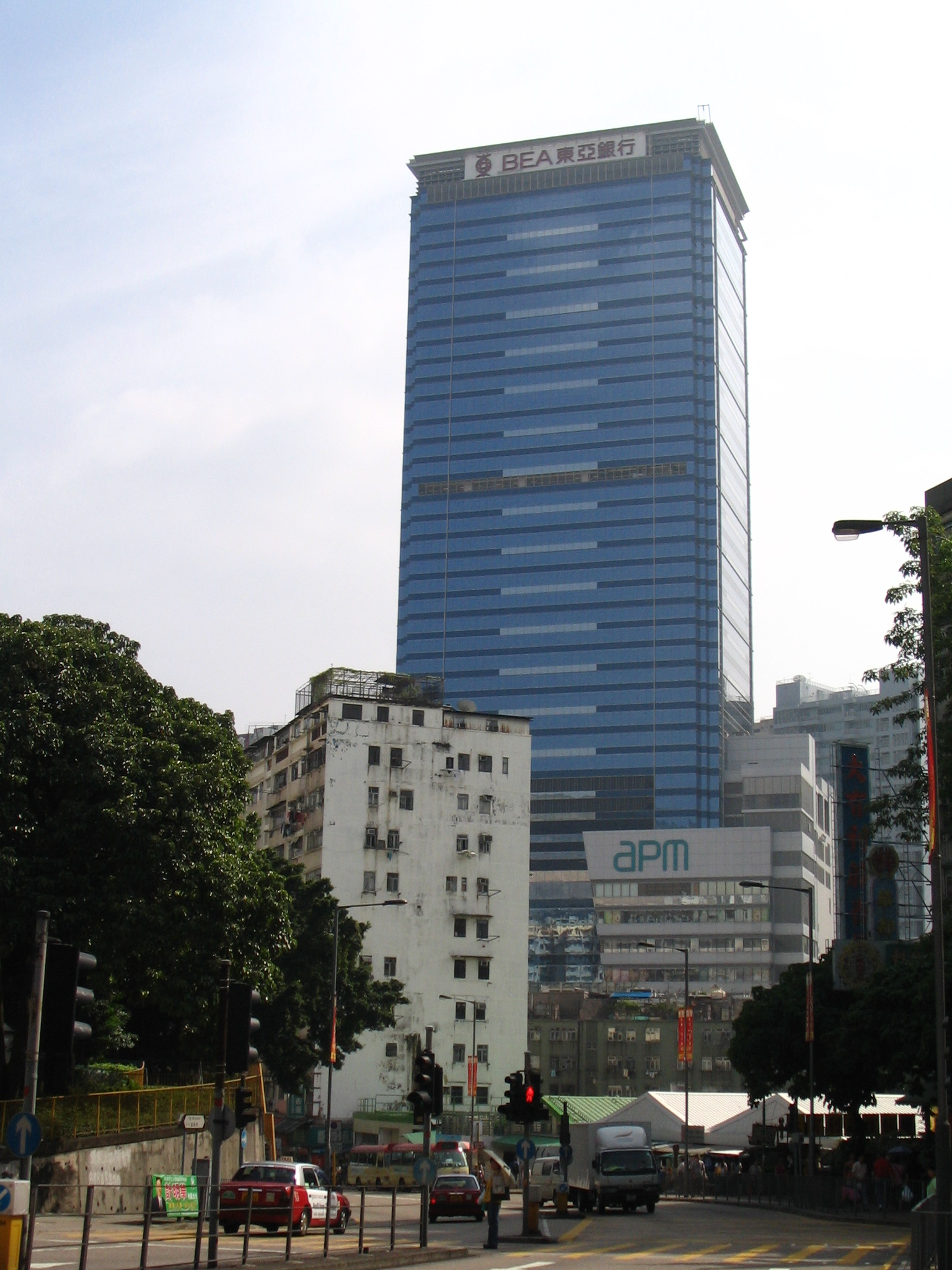
Millennium City 5

Millennium City (Chinese: 創紀之城; Jyutping: cong1 gei2 zi1 seng4) is a group of skyscrapers in Kwun Tong, Hong Kong built along the southern side of Kwun Tong Road near Ngau Tau Kok station and developed by Sun Hung Kai Properties.

The Millennium City project currently consists of five buildings, numbered 1, 2, 3, 5 and 6. The number 4 is widely regarded as unlucky in many parts of Asia and in both Chinese and Japanese it is a homophone for "death".

Millennium City 1 and 2 are connected and share a mall and a lobby on their ground floor. They host the headquarters of Standard Chartered Bank, a data centre and various other offices. Their reflective blue glass walls look strikingly modern against the areas other, old factory buildings. The two buildings are located opposite to Ngau Tau Kok station.

Millennium City 3 is a continuation of buildings 1 and 2, but separated from towers 1 and 2 by the Meyer Building. It is also mostly offices and has a similar architectural design to buildings 1 and 2. However, glass walls are used to a lesser extent and more white tiles are incorporated.

Millennium City 5 is built near Kwun Tong station. The building is well known because of the shopping mall it holds - apm. The project has a site area of 107,000 square feet (9,900 m^{2}) and contains over 700,000 square feet (65,000 m^{2}) of office space on top of a regional shopping centre of about 600,000 square feet (56,000 m^{2}). The Bank of East Asia bought the majority of office space here as a back-up operation centre.

Millennium City 6 and 7 are under planning, and both will be built in the Kwun Tong Industrial Area, farther from Kwun Tong Road.

Millennium City 8 is currently under construction. It is on the site of the former KMB Bus Kwun Tong depot. There are two buildings with total floor area of 1.15m sq ft and the shopping mall occupies 12 floors with another 21 floors of offices and 4 floors of underground car parks. The development will be completed in 2022-23.

== See also ==
- List of tallest buildings in Hong Kong
