= Ngau Tau Kok station =

MTR station in Kowloon, Hong Kong

Ngau Tau Kok 牛頭角
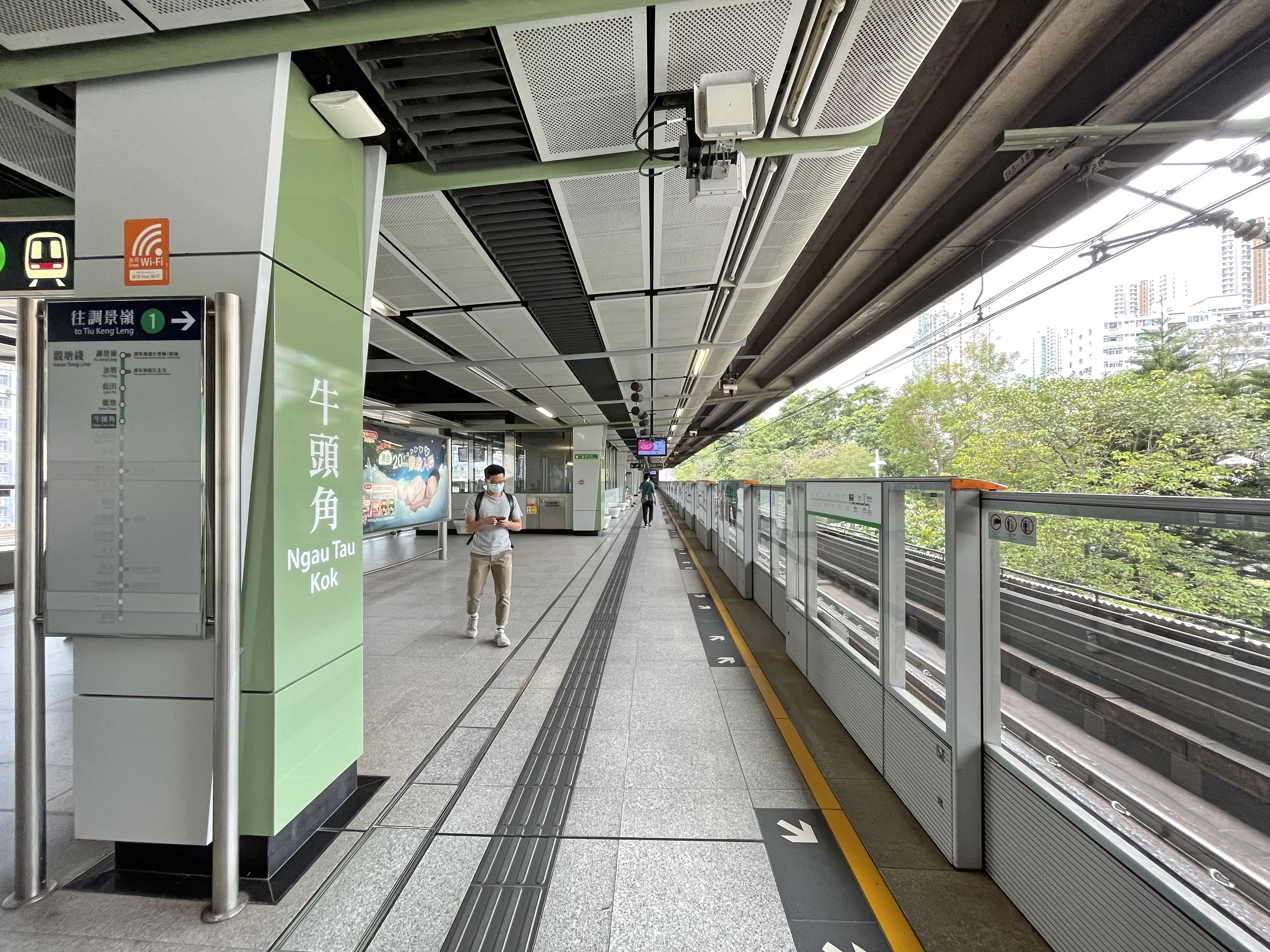
- Ngau Tau Kok Station (2021)

Chinese name
- Traditional Chinese: 牛頭角
- Simplified Chinese: 牛头角
- Jyutping: Ngau4tau4gok3
- Hanyu Pinyin: Niútóujiǎo
- Literal meaning: Cow Head's Corner
Transcriptions
Standard Mandarin
- Hanyu Pinyin: Niútóujiǎo
Yue: Cantonese
- Yale Romanization: Ngàutàugok
- IPA: [ŋɐw˩tʰɐw˩kɔk̚˧]
- Jyutping: Ngau4tau4gok3

General information
- Location: Between Kwun Tong Road and Ngau Tau Kok Road, Ngau Tau Kok; Kwun Tong District, Hong Kong
- Coordinates: 22°18′55″N 114°13′09″E
- System: MTR rapid transit station
- Operator: MTR Corporation
- Line: Kwun Tong line
- Platforms: 2 (1 island platform)
- Tracks: 2
- Connections: Bus, minibus

Construction
- Structure type: Elevated
- Platform levels: 1
- Accessible: yes

Other information
- Station code: NTK

History
- Opened: 1 October 1979; 46 years ago
- Electrified: 1,500 V DC (Overhead line)

Services
Preceding station	MTR	Following station
Kowloon Bay towards Whampoa	Kwun Tong line	Kwun Tong towards Tiu Keng Leng
Track layout
Location
- Location within MTR

Ngau Tau Kok (Chinese: 牛頭角; Cantonese Yale: Ngàutàugok) is a station on the Hong Kong MTR Kwun Tong line. It is located in the Ngau Tau Kok area of Kowloon East, between Kwun Tong and Kowloon Bay stations. It was among the earliest stations in the network, becoming operational on 1 October 1979.

Ngau Tau Kok is one of three stations to be located above ground on the line, the others being Kwun Tong and Kowloon Bay. The majority of passengers use Ngau Tau Kok station to commute.

Due to difficulties in installing platform screen doors (PSDs) in above ground stations, the MTR decided not to install PSDs in this station, instead installing automatic platform gates (APGs) on the station's platforms in 2011.

== History ==
Contract 211 consisting the construction of the stations and adjacent line sections was awarded to Hip Hing Construction Limited.

Ngau Tau Kok station opened when the Kwun Tong line opened on 1 October 1979.

== Station layout ==
Platforms 1 and 2 share the same island platform, and the east parts are curved, so the gap between platform and train is large.

U1; Platforms	Platform 1	Kwun Tong line towards Tiu Keng Leng (Kwun Tong) →
U1; Platforms	Island platform, doors will open on the right
U1; Platforms	Platform 2	← Kwun Tong line towards Whampoa (Kowloon Bay)
G	Concourse	Exits, customer service, MTRshops
G	Concourse	Vending machines, automatic teller machines
-	Subway	Subway to Garden Estate and Kwun Tong industrial area

== Gallery ==
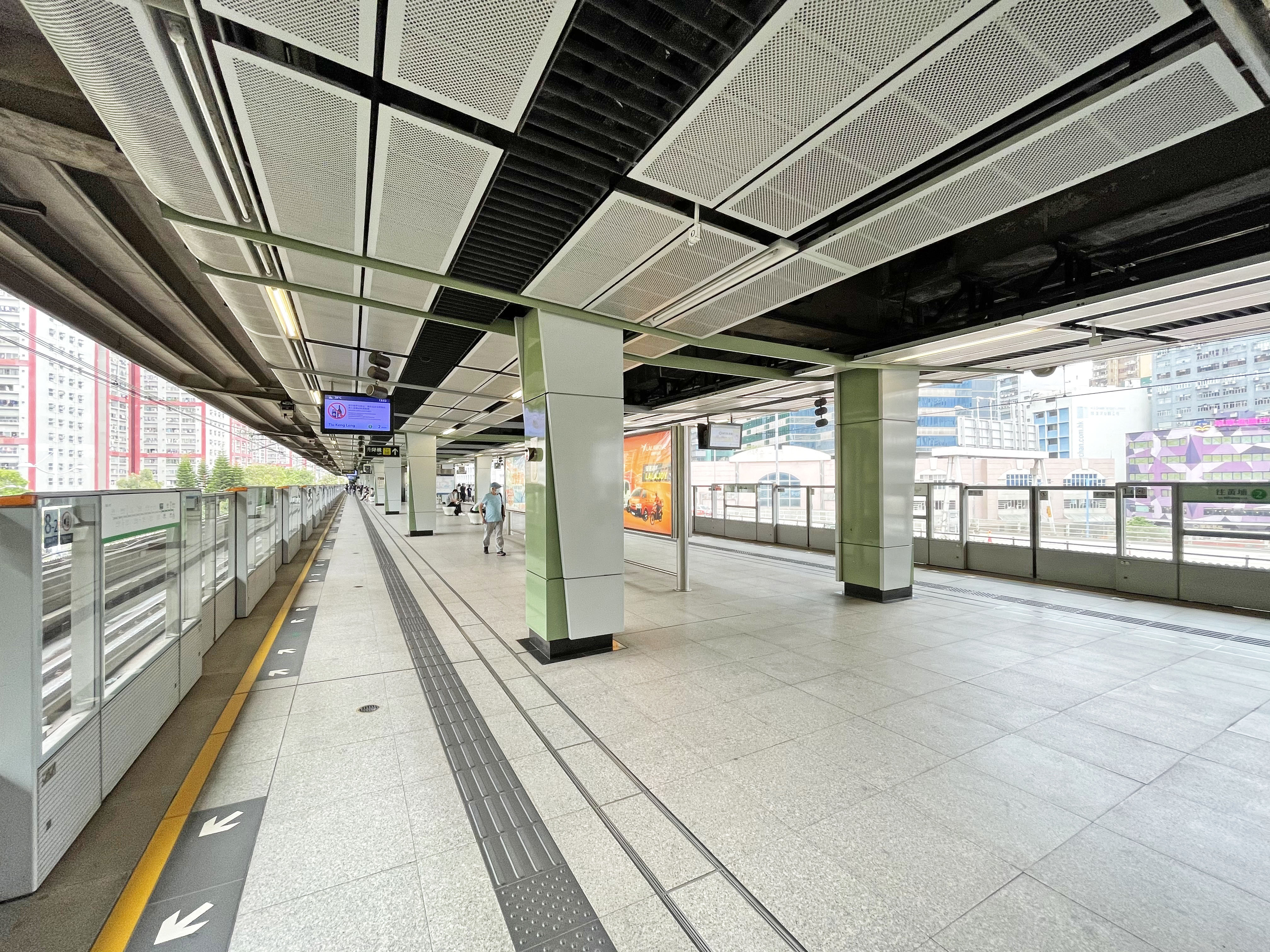
Station Platforms (March 2021)

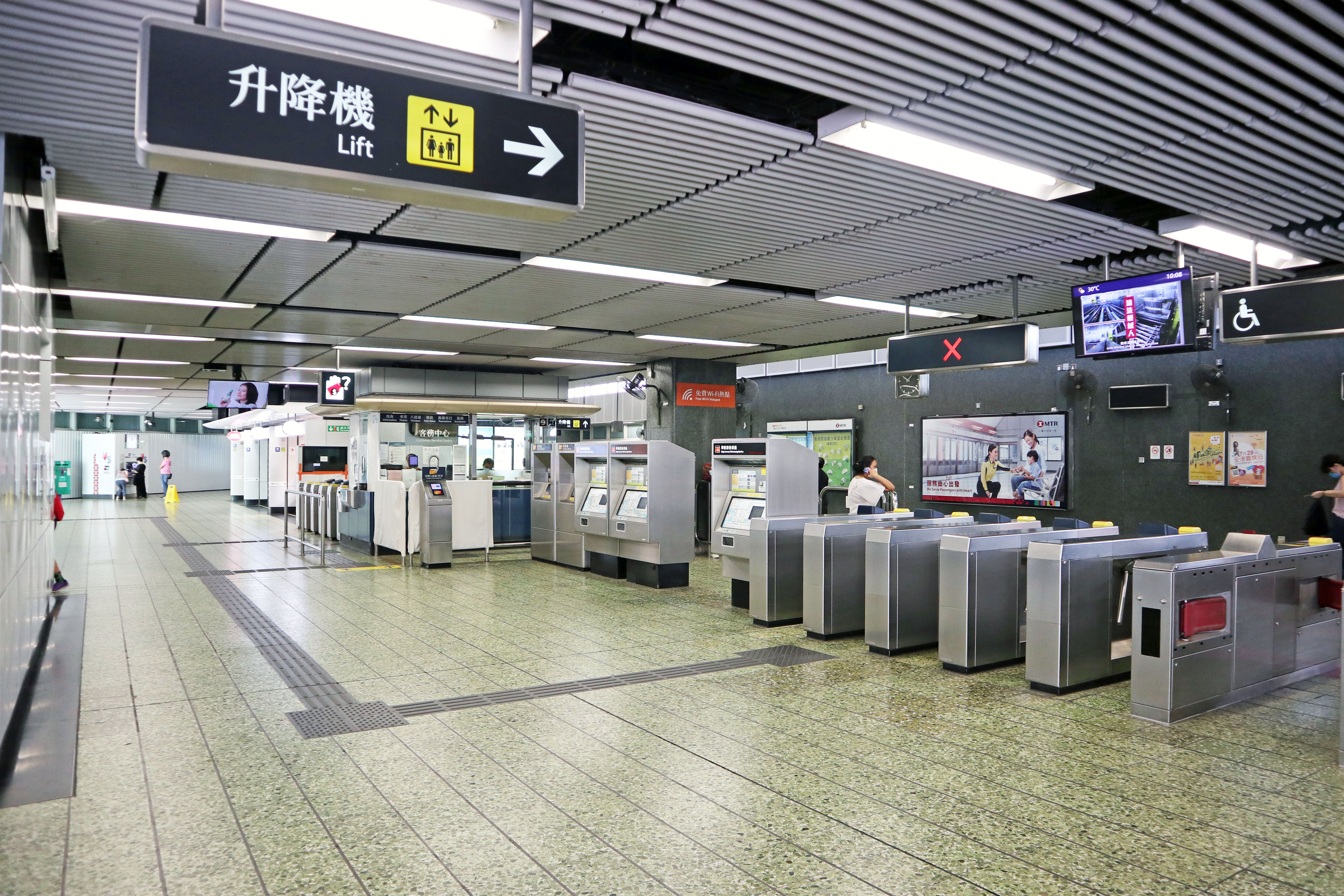
Concourse, near Exit A (2020)

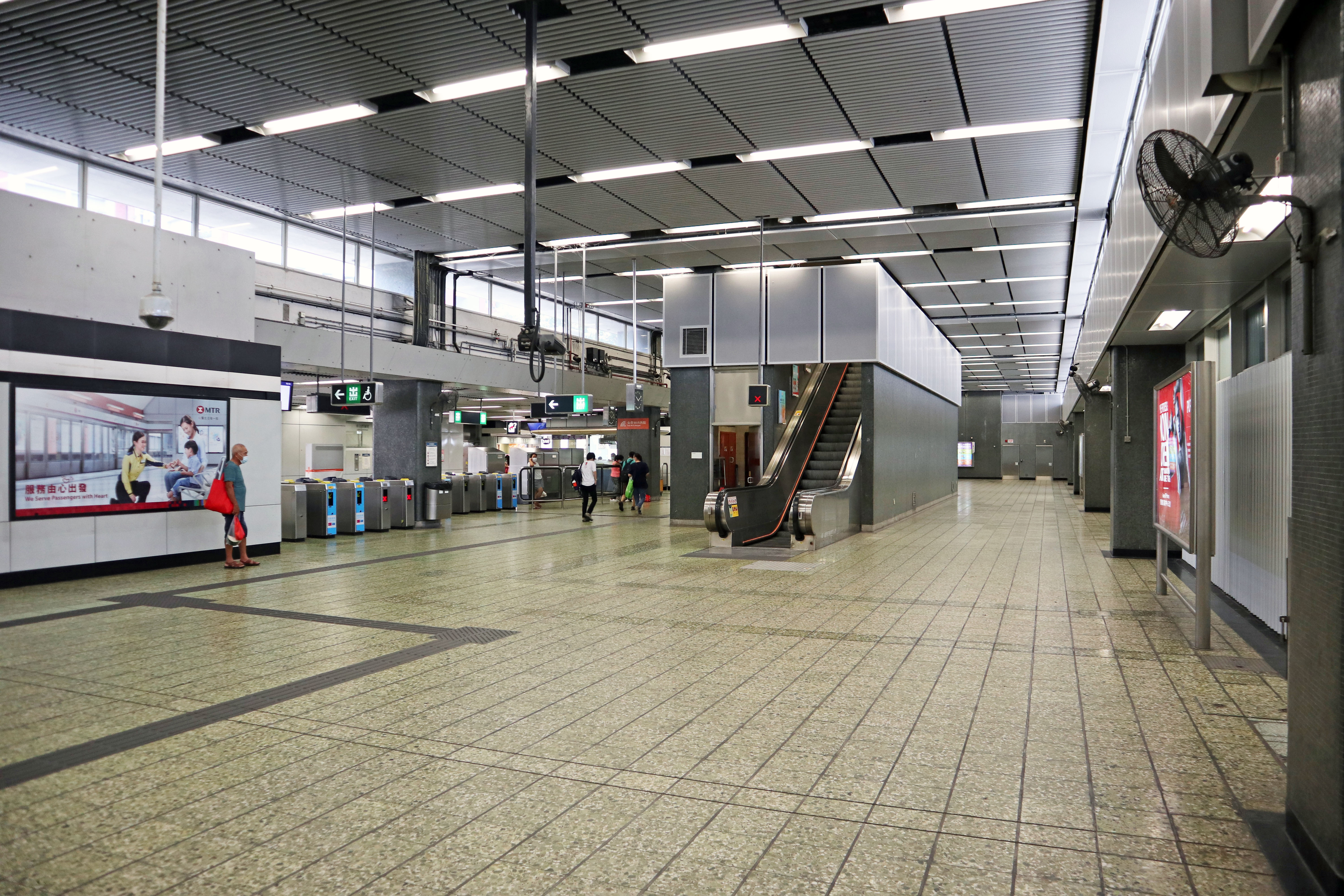
Paid area of the concourse (2020)

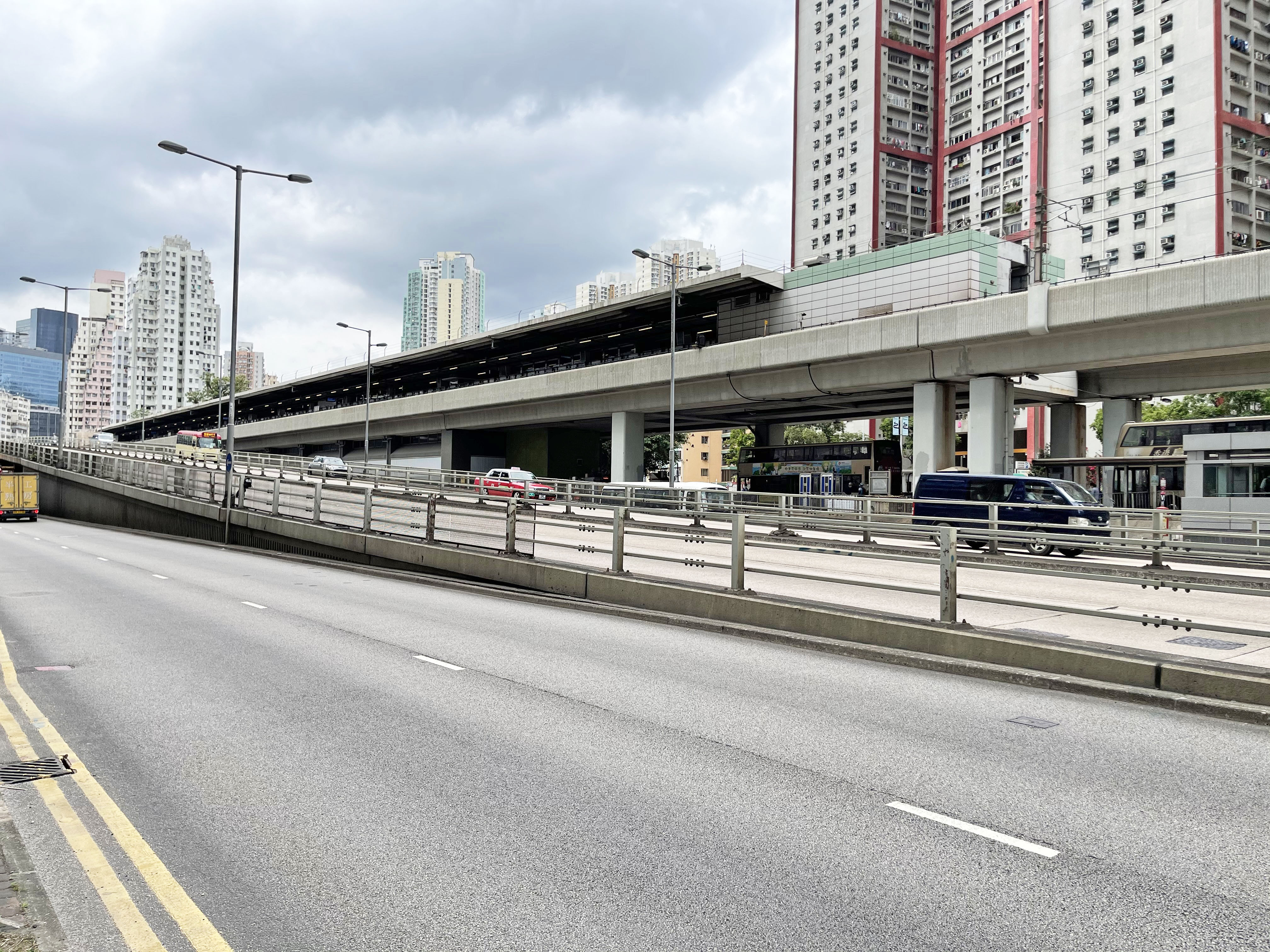
Exterior of the station (2021)

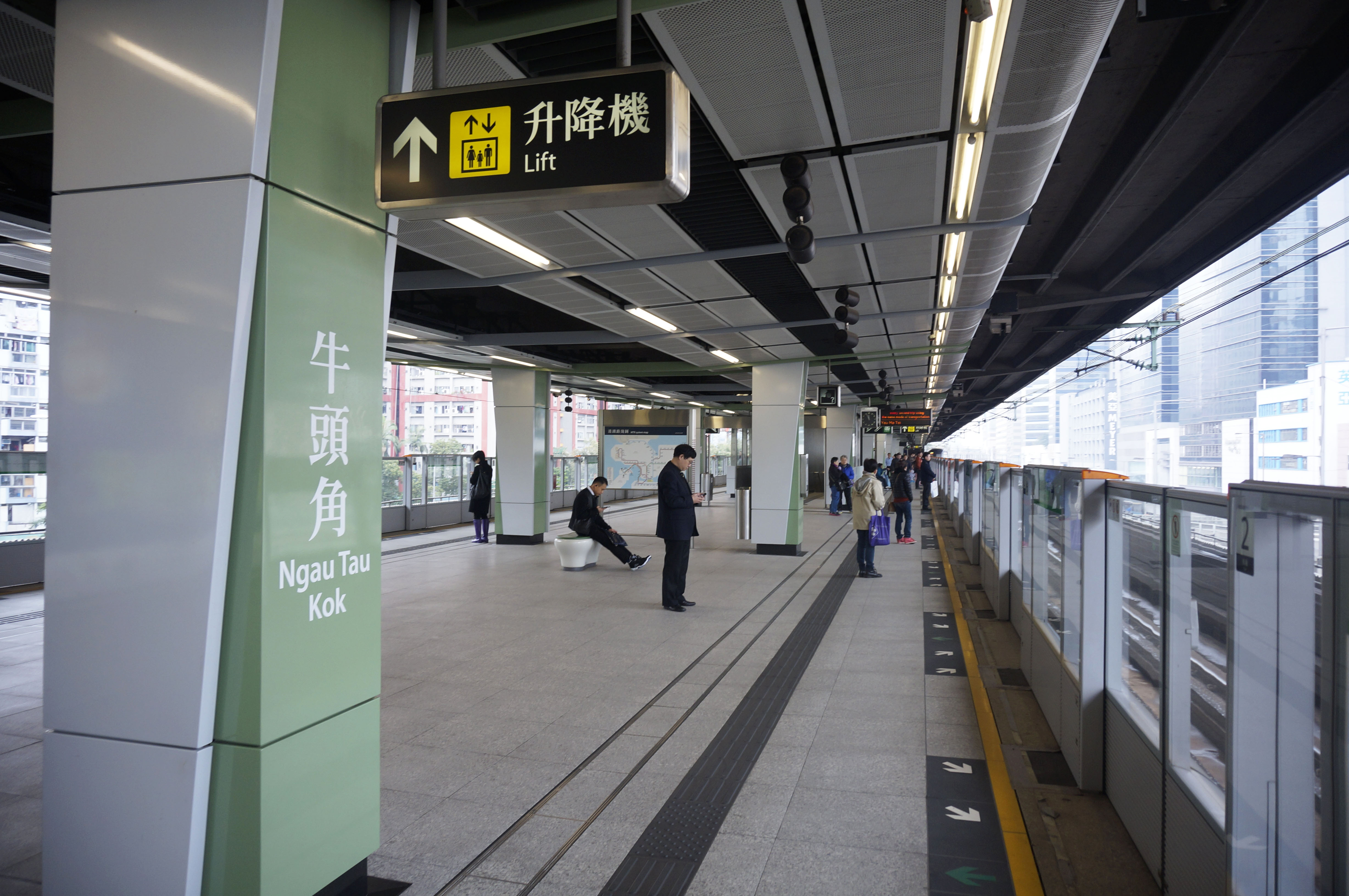
Both platforms of Ngau Tau Kok station in March 2014

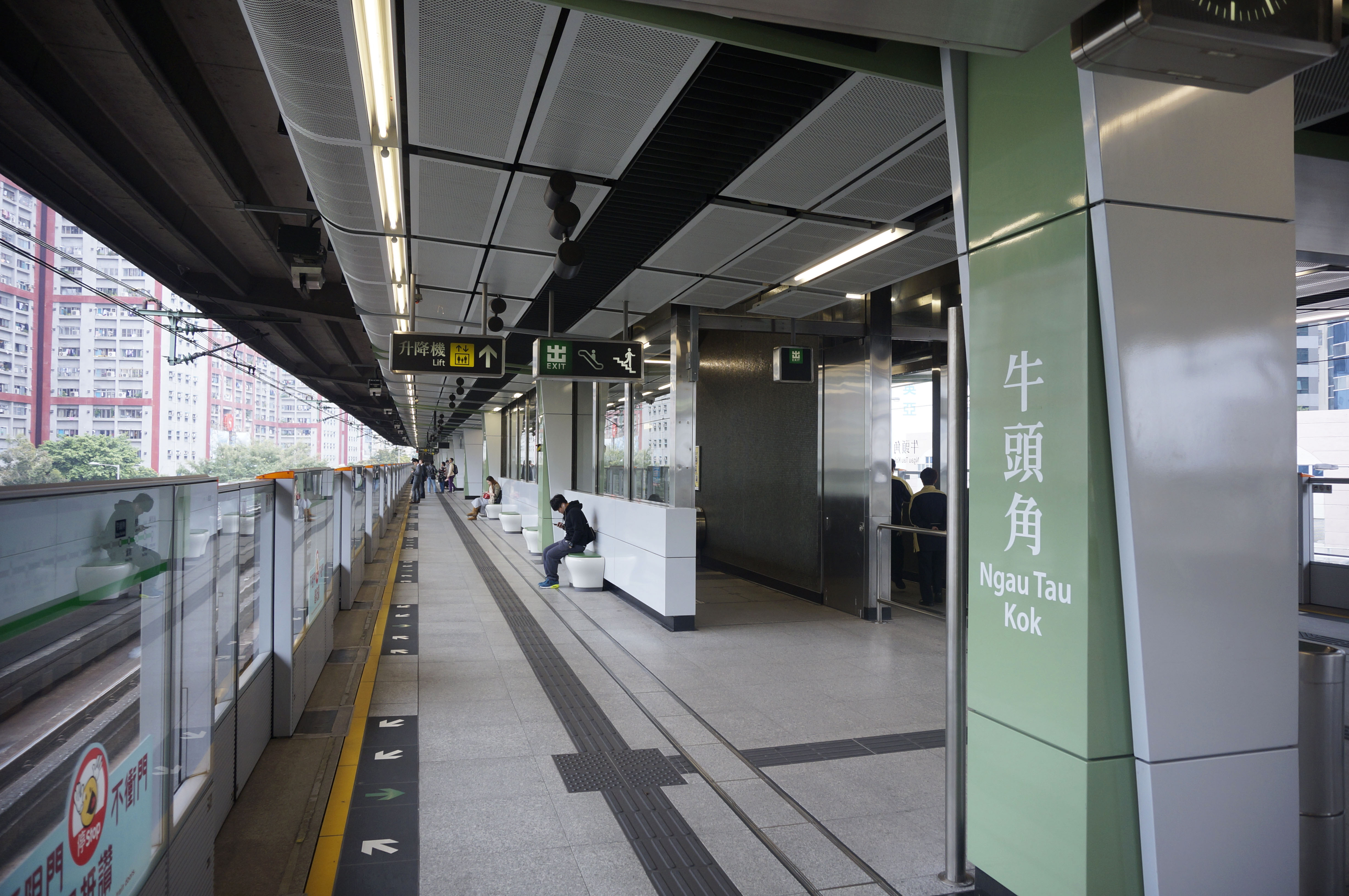
Ngau Tau Kok station platform 1 in March 2014

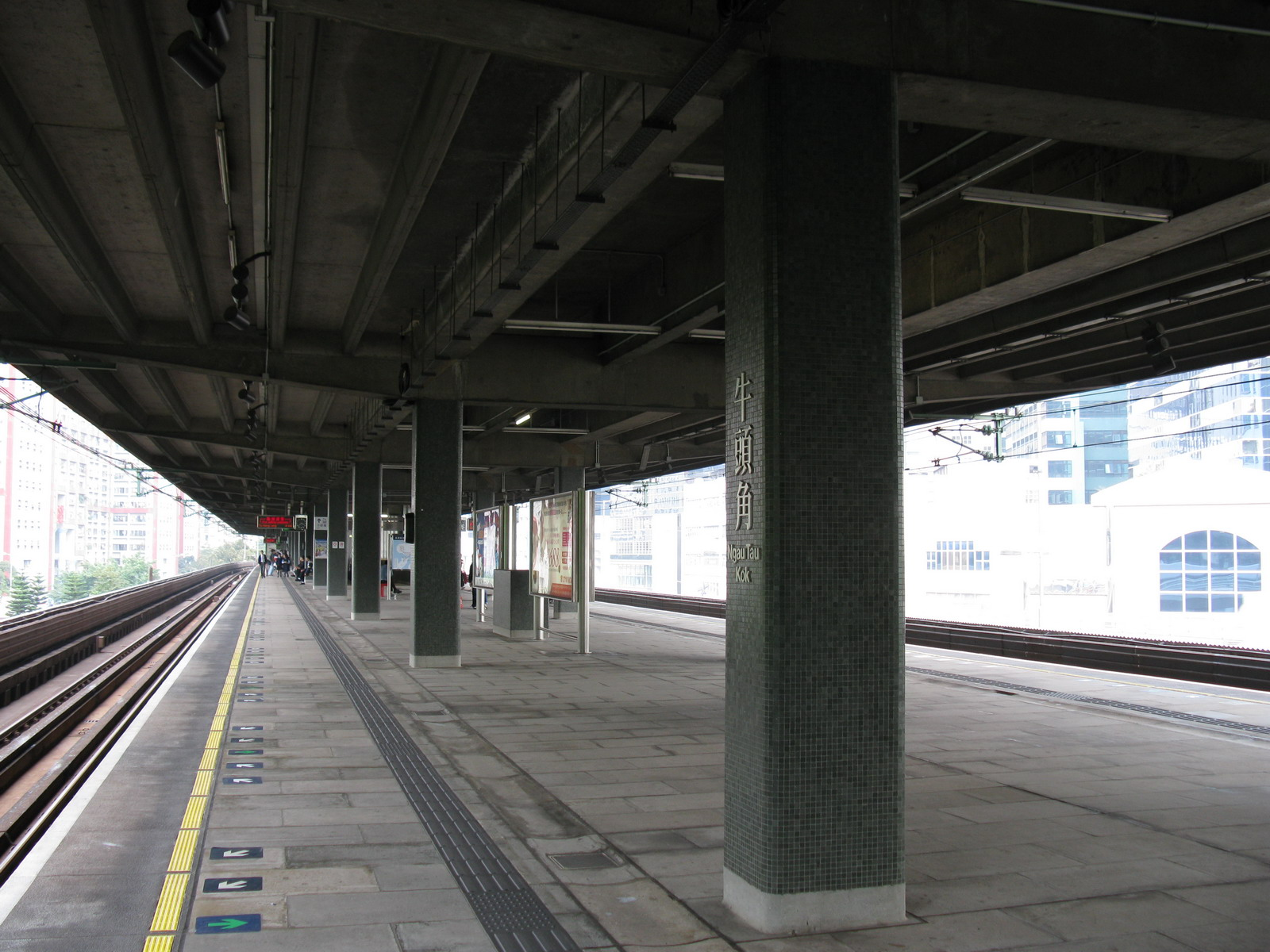
Ngau Tau Kok station in January 2008, before platform gates were installed.

== Entrances/exits ==
- A: Millennium City
- B1: Lotus Tower
- B2: Garden Estate
- B3: Ngau Tau Kok Road
- B4: Kwun Tong Road
- B5: How Ming Street
- B6: Lai Yip Street
