= Kowloon Bay station =

MTR station in Kowloon, Hong Kong

Kowloon Bay 九龍灣
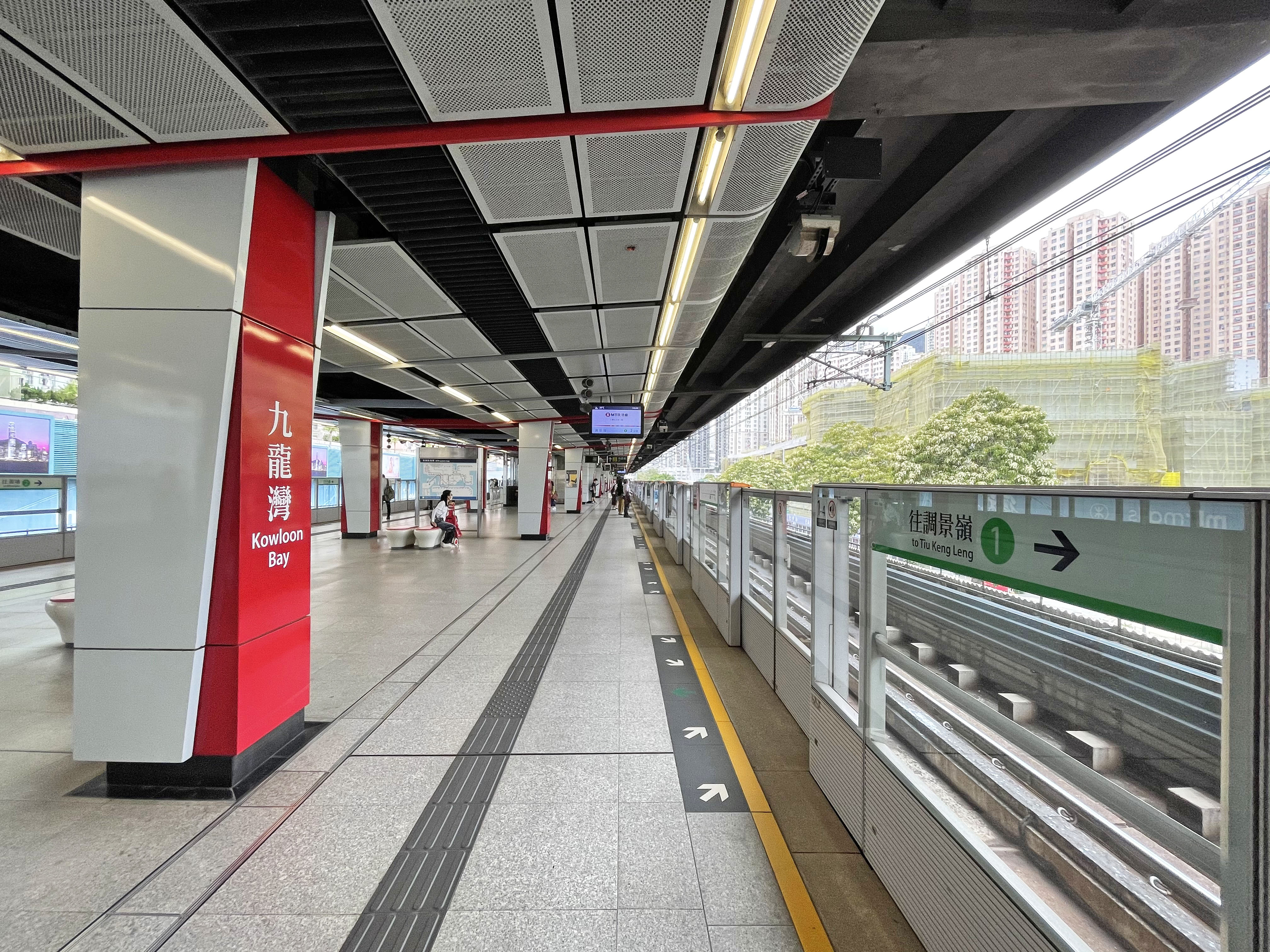
- Station Platform (2021)

Chinese name
- Traditional Chinese: 九龍灣
- Simplified Chinese: 九龙湾
- Jyutping: Gau2lung4waan1
- Hanyu Pinyin: Jiǔlóngwān
- Literal meaning: Nine Dragons Bay
Transcriptions
Standard Mandarin
- Hanyu Pinyin: Jiǔlóngwān
Yue: Cantonese
- Yale Romanization: Gáulùngwāan
- IPA: [kɐw˧˥lʊŋ˩wan˥]
- Jyutping: Gau2lung4waan1

General information
- Location: Kwun Tong Road near Telford Gardens, Kowloon Bay; Kwun Tong District, Hong Kong
- Coordinates: 22°19′25″N 114°12′51″E
- System: MTR rapid transit station
- Operator: MTR Corporation
- Line: Kwun Tong line
- Platforms: 2 (1 island platform)
- Tracks: 2
- Connections: Bus, minibus

Construction
- Structure type: Elevated
- Platform levels: 1
- Accessible: yes

Other information
- Station code: KOB

History
- Opened: 1 October 1979; 46 years ago

Services
Preceding station	MTR	Following station
Choi Hung towards Whampoa	Kwun Tong line	Ngau Tau Kok towards Tiu Keng Leng
Track layout
Location
- Location within MTR

Kowloon Bay is a station on the Hong Kong MTR Kwun Tong line. It is located between Choi Hung and Ngau Tau Kok stations in Kowloon East. The station was opened in 1979.

Kowloon Bay station is one of the five MTR stations on the Kwun Tong line located above ground level, and one of three to be elevated and open-air (the other two being Ngau Tau Kok and Kwun Tong). Due to difficulties in installing platform screen doors (PSDs) in above ground stations,automatic platform gates (APGs) were installed on the station's platforms in 2011. In 2012, the MTR renovated Kowloon Bay station, replacing the original grey-black mosaic walls and pillars with red baked lacquer panels.

The headquarters of the MTR Corporation and the depot for the Kwun Tong line are both located at this station. Also located above the depot is Telford Gardens, the first residential property to be developed by the MTR Corporation. Kowloon Bay station is connected to Telford Plaza, a shopping mall located next to Telford Gardens.

== History ==
John Lok & Partners was chosen to construct the station and adjacent line sections.

Kowloon Bay station opened when the Kwun Tong line became operational on 1 October 1979.

== Station layout ==
Platforms 1 and 2 share the same island platform.

U2; Platforms	Platform 1	Kwun Tong line towards Tiu Keng Leng (Ngau Tau Kok) →
U2; Platforms	Island platform, doors will open on the right
U2; Platforms	Platform 2	← Kwun Tong line towards Whampoa (Choi Hung)
	Telford Plaza	Exit C
U1	Concourse	Exits, Telford Plaza, Telford Gardens
U1	Concourse	Customer service, MTRshops
U1	Concourse	Hang Seng Bank, vending machines, automatic teller machines
U1	Concourse	"iCentre" free internet access
G	Depot	Exits, MTR Kowloon Bay Depot

== Entrances/exits ==
- A: MTR Headquarters Building
- B: Amoy Gardens, East Kowloon Cultural Centre
- C: Telford Plaza
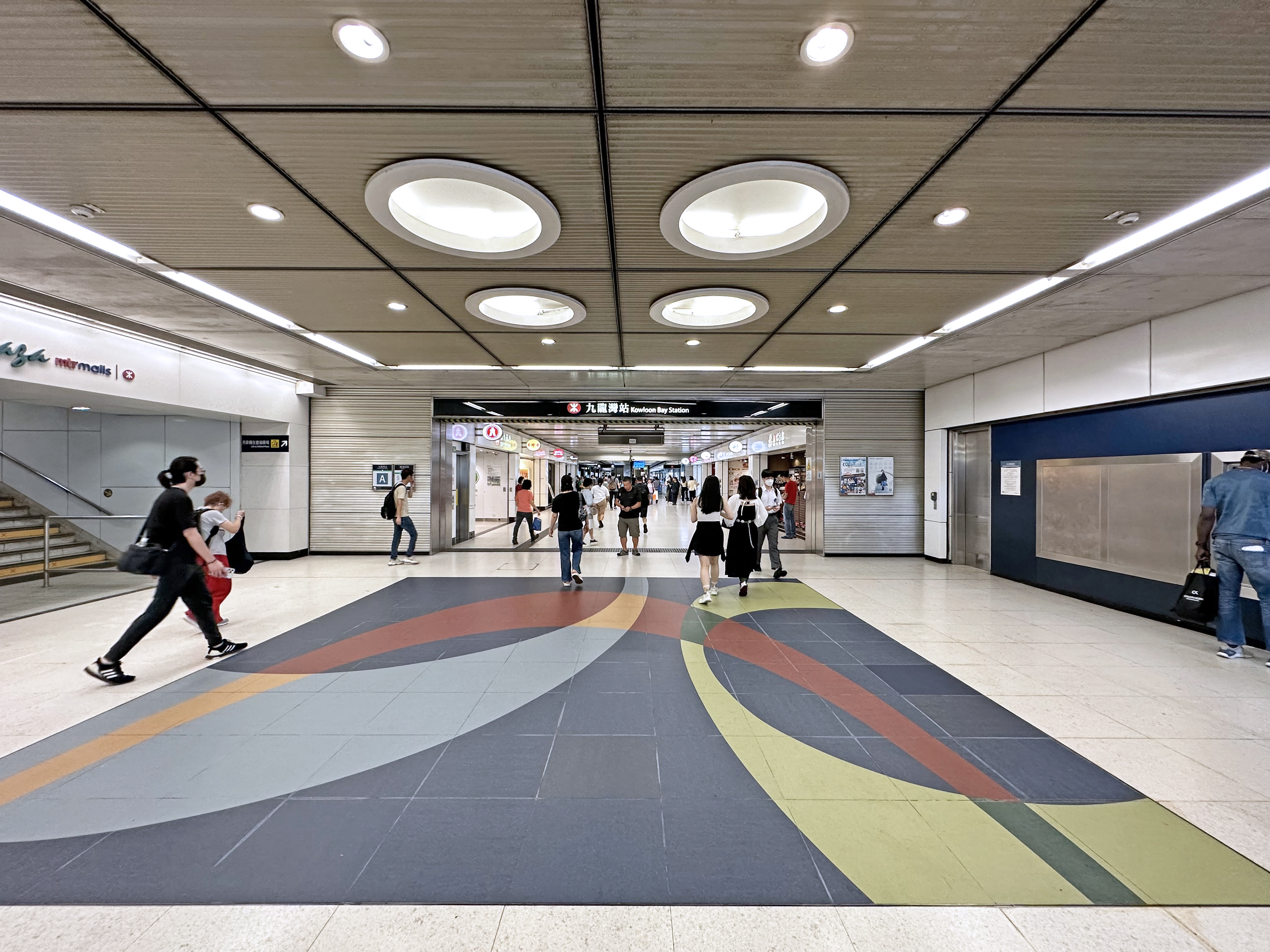
Exit A

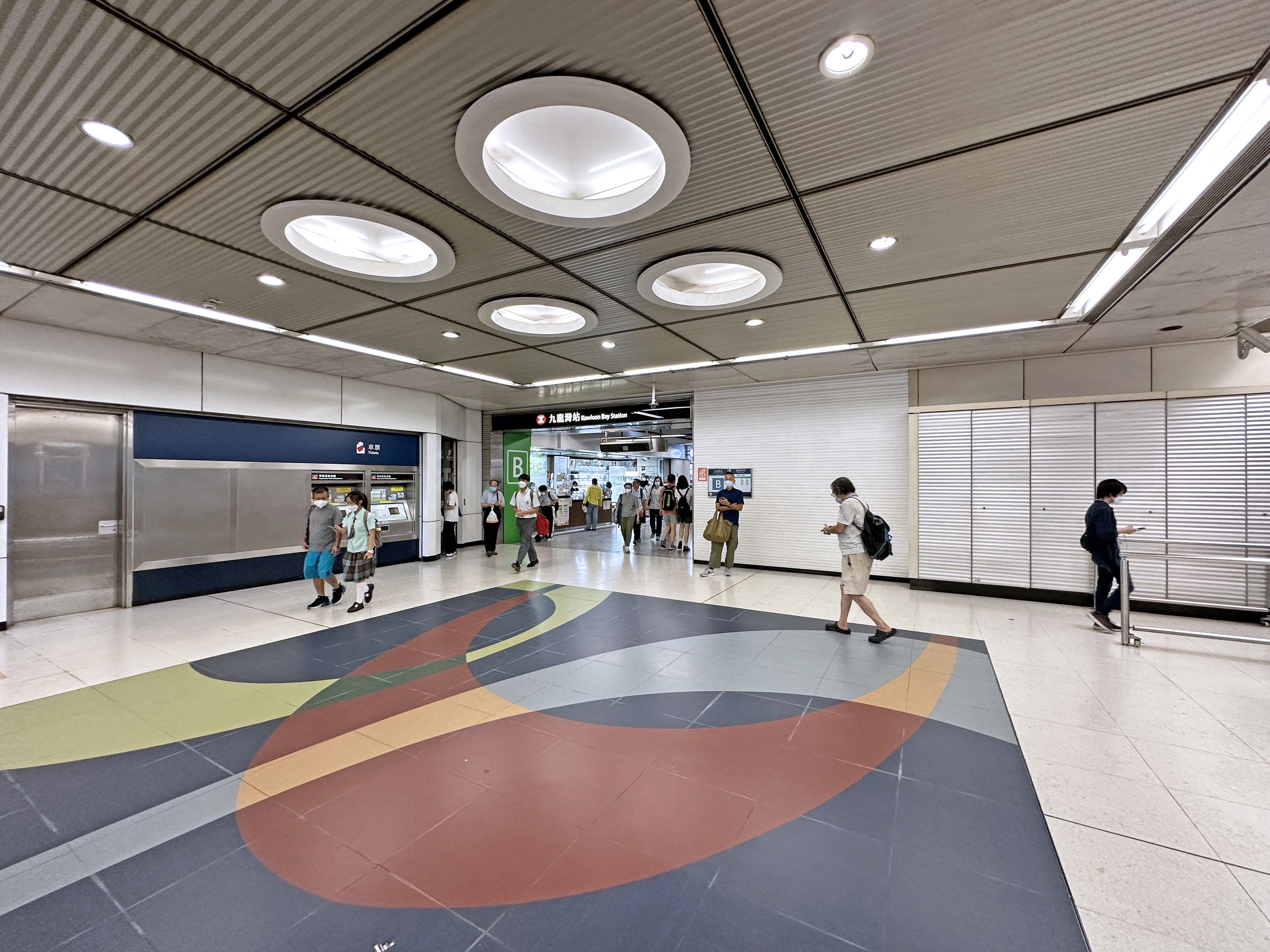
Exit B

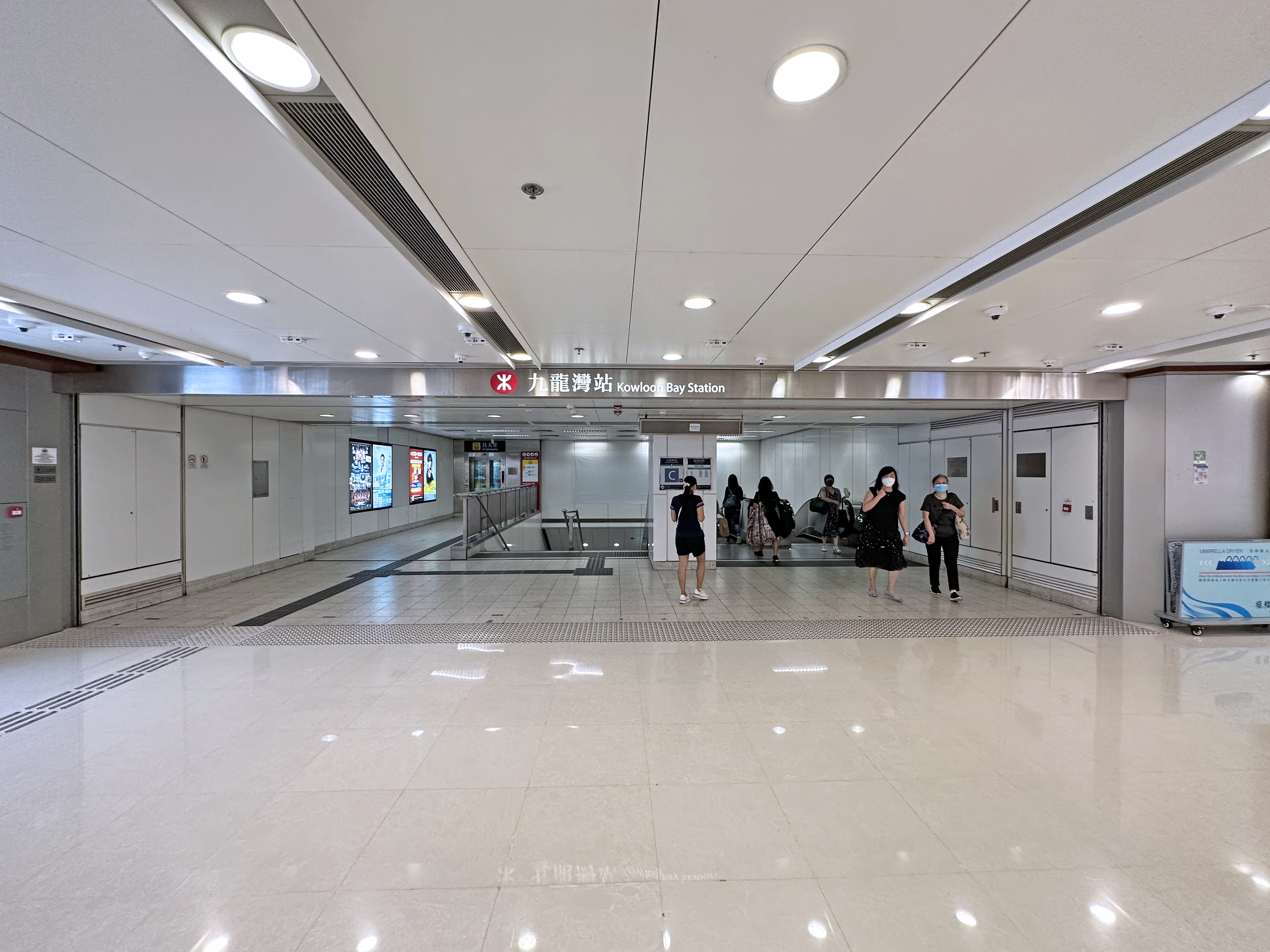
Exit C

== Gallery ==
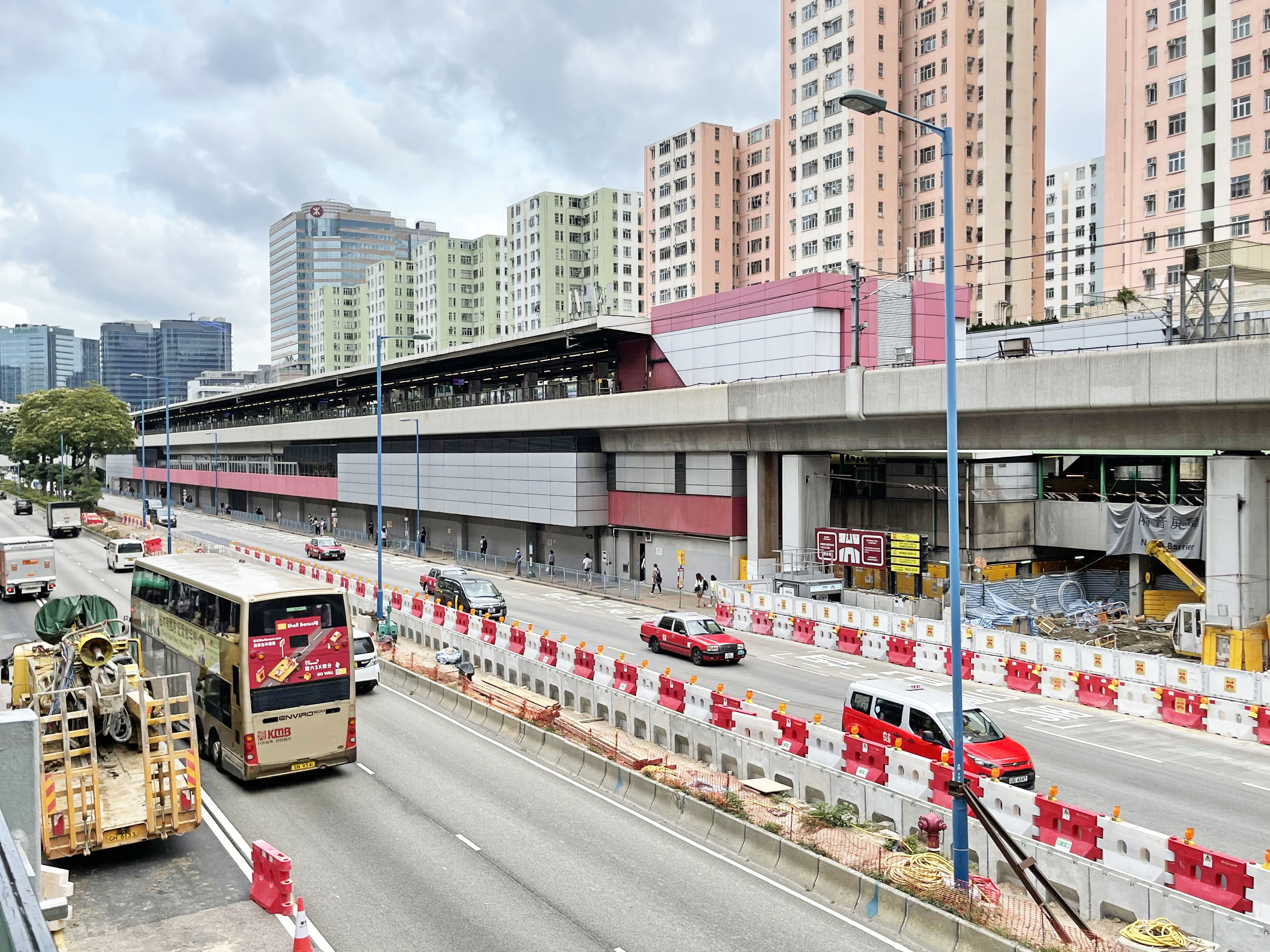
Exterior of station (2021)

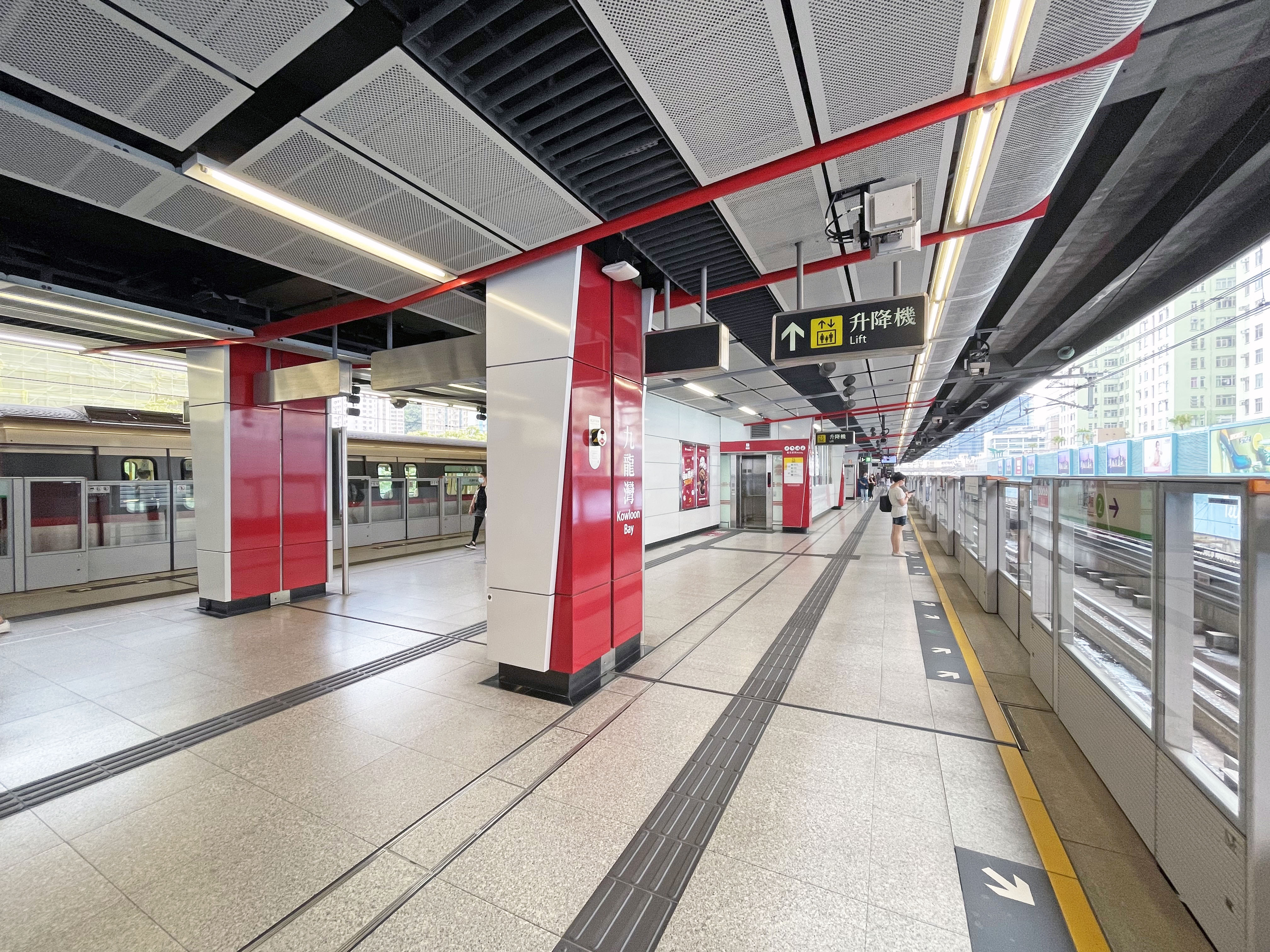
Platforms 1 and 2 (2021)

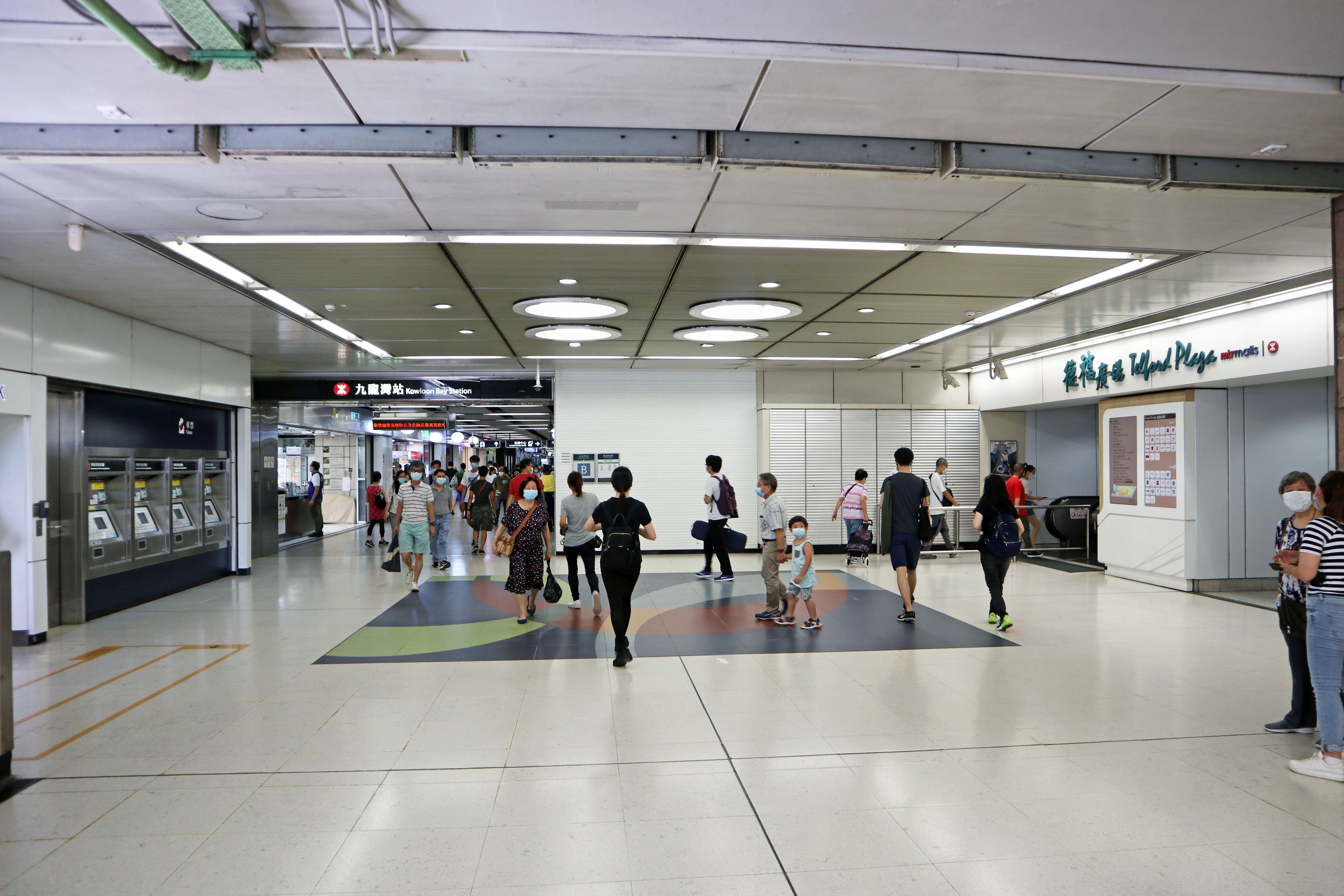
Exit B with access to Telford Plaza on the right (2020)

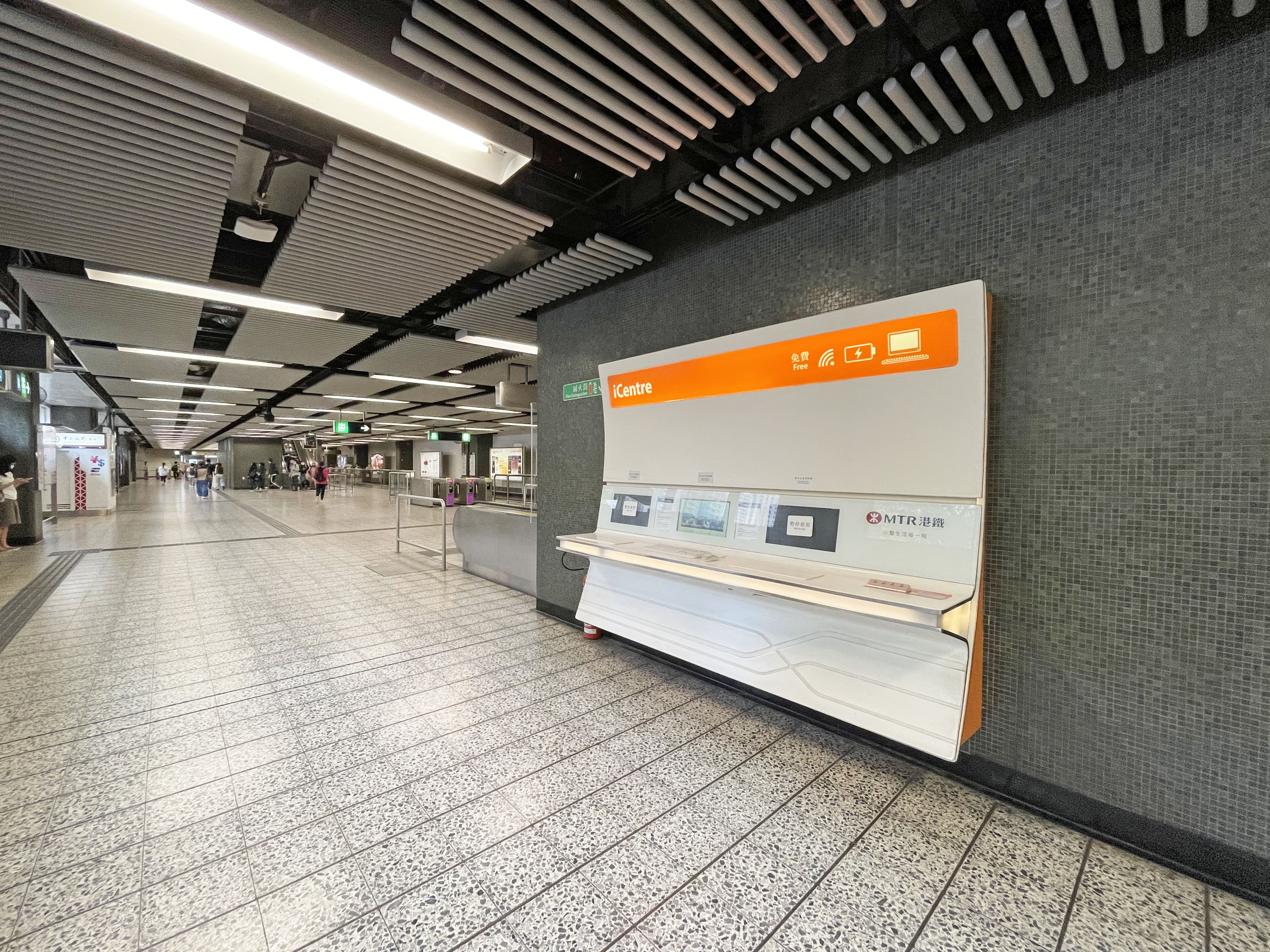
Free internet access in the station concourse (2021)

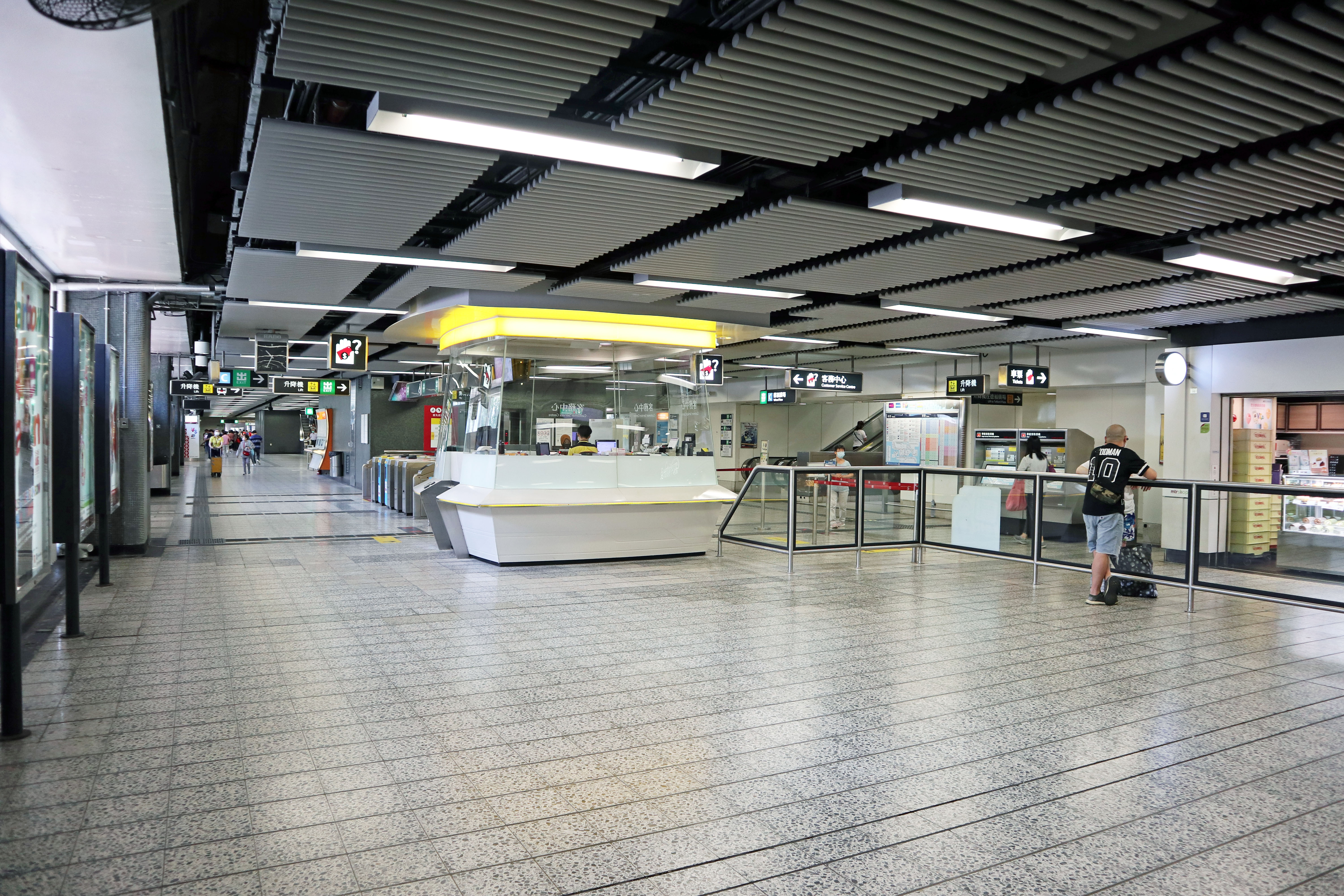
Station concourse (2020)

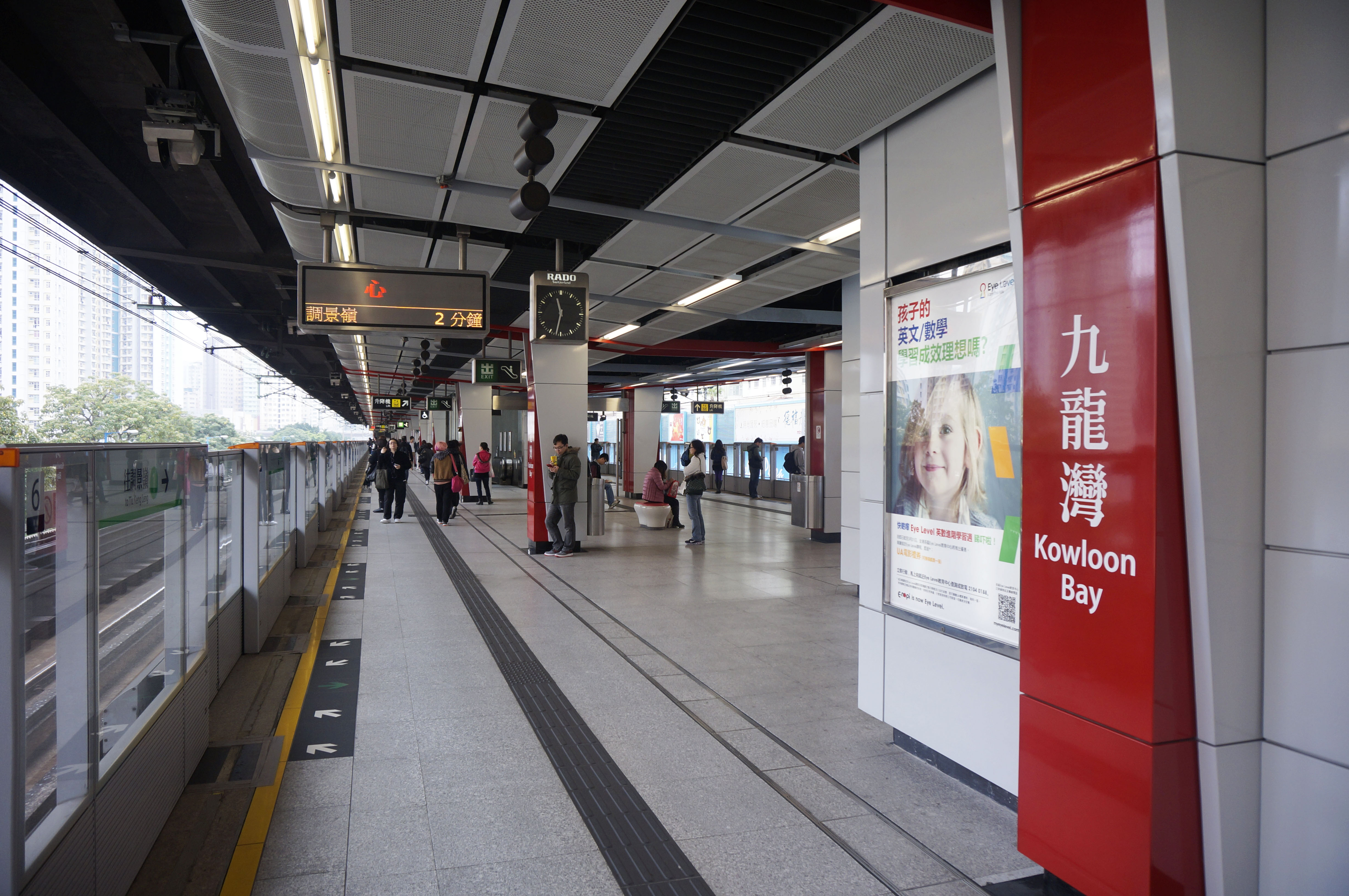
Both platforms (2014)

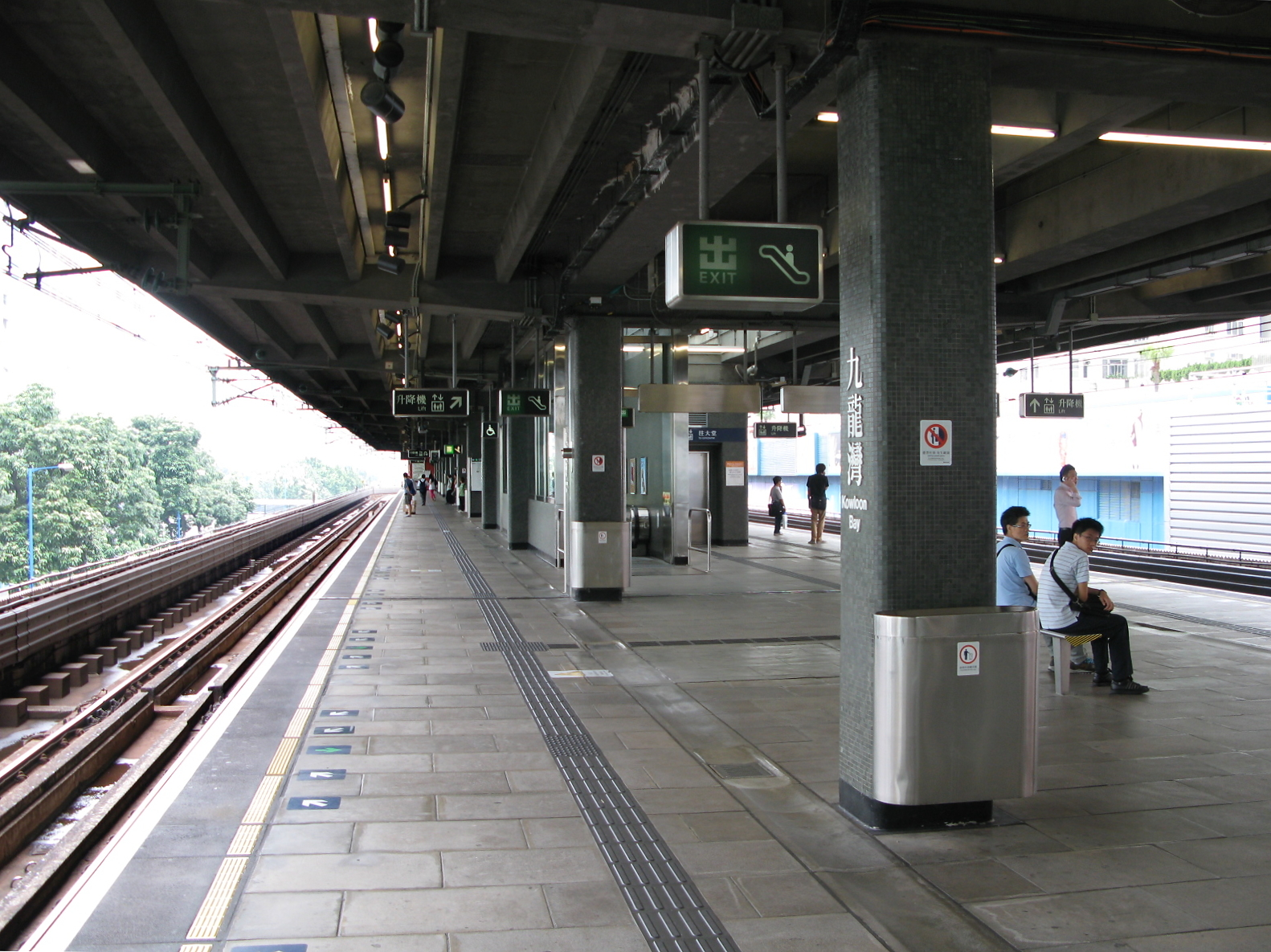
Platforms prior to the installation of half-height platform gates (2009)
