= List of MTR stations =

Hong Kong rapid transit system stations

The MTR system map

The MTR, the rapid transit system of Hong Kong, encompasses 10 heavy rail lines and 98 stations as of August 2022. The following list sorts the stations according to their service line. In addition to the 98 metro stations listed on this page, the MTR system also consists of 68 light rail stops and one high-speed rail terminus in the city.

The current system was formed after the merger with the Kowloon–Canton Railway on 2 December 2007, when the operations of the East Rail line, the West Rail line, the Ma On Shan line and the Light Rail system were transferred to the MTR Corporation. Serving exclusively the northwestern New Territories, the light rail network comprises 12 routes, serving 68 stops. The network is being expanded and several new lines are being proposed.

== East Rail line ==
East Rail line
Livery	Name	Photo	Connections	District	Opened	Code	Notes
	Admiralty 金鐘		Island line Tsuen Wan line South Island line	Central and Western	12 February 1980	ADM	
	Exhibition Centre 會展			Wan Chai	15 May 2022	EXC	
	Hung Hom 紅磡 formerly Kowloon		Tuen Ma line	Yau Tsim Mong/Kowloon City	30 November 1975	HUH	(Note: It was first called Kowloon station and the terminus of Kowloon–Canton Railway, replacing the old Kowloon station (terminus) at Tsim Sha Tsui. Kowloon station was formally renamed as Hung Hom station in February/March 1996.)
	Mong Kok East 旺角東 formerly Mong Kok, Yaumati			Yau Tsim Mong/Kowloon City	1 October 1910	MKK	(Note: Originally called Yau Ma Ti Station; first renamed as Mong Kok Station on 1 January 1969, redeveloped and partially re-opened on 3 May 1982, and further renamed as Mong Kok East Station on 2 December 2007.) (Note: Mong Kok East station of the East Rail line and Mong Kok station of the Tsuen Wan line and Kwun Tong line are not physically connected. There is pedestrian transfer via a footbridge; the journey time is approximately 10–15 minutes on foot.)
	Kowloon Tong 九龍塘		Kwun Tong line	Sham Shui Po/Kowloon City	4 May 1982	KOT	
	Tai Wai 大圍		Tuen Ma line	Sha Tin	15 August 1983	TAW	
	Sha Tin 沙田			Sha Tin	1 October 1910	SHT	
	Fo Tan 火炭			Sha Tin	15 February 1985	FOT	(Note: Fo Tan and Racecourse are parallel stations. Racecourse station is only open when horseracing or a special event is held at Sha Tin Racecourse.)
	Racecourse 馬場			Sha Tin	7 October 1978	RAC	(Note: Racecourse station was opened to tie in with the opening of the new Shatin Racecourse on that date. The station was upgraded and reopened on 1 October 1985 to tie in with the opening of a new grandstand at the racecourse.)
	University 大學 formerly Ma Liu Shui			Sha Tin	24 September 1956	UNI	(Note: Its forerunner was Ma Liu Shui station, which was renamed as University station on 1 January 1967. University station was rebuilt and moved slightly seawards to tie in with KCR electrification, and was opened on 26 April 1983.)
	Tai Po Market 大埔墟			Tai Po	7 April 1983	TAP	(Note: The current station is a new station to reprovision an old one. The new one is about 0.8 kilometres (0.50 mi) south of the old one. The old Tai Po Market station started off as a temporary flag station at KCR's opening on 1 October 1910. On 11 November of the same year, it was turned into a passenger station. Tai Po Market station was then built into a Chinese Style station in 1913, discontinued as a railway station on 6 April 1983, and re-opened as the Hong Kong Railway Museum on 20 December 1985.)
	Tai Wo 太和			Tai Po	9 May 1989	TWO	
	Fanling 粉嶺			North	1 October 1910	FAN	
	Sheung Shui 上水			North	16 May 1930	SHS	
	Lo Wu 羅湖		Shenzhen Metro; Line 1	North	14 October 1949	LOW	(Note: A temporary station was actually set up at Lo Wu from the first day of Kowloon Canton Railway operations of 1 October 1910. 14 October 1949 was when through-train service to Mainland China was stopped after the Communist capture of Canton on the same day, and since then, passengers to the Mainland have had to get off the train at Lo Wu and cross the Lo Wu Bridge to take another (Chinese) train to Guangzhou from Shenzhen. Lo Wu Station has since gradually developed from a "border halt" (in the words of the 1949/50 KCR Annual Report) into a proper terminal station.)
	Lok Ma Chau 落馬洲		Shenzhen Metro; Line 4, Line 10	Yuen Long	15 August 2007	LMC	(Note: Kwu Tung and Lok Ma Chau are stations on the Lok Ma Chau Spur Line, a branch from Sheung Shui station of the East Rail line. Kwu Tung is proposed.)

== Kwun Tong line ==
Kwun Tong line
Livery	Name	Photo	Connections	District	Opened	Code	Notes
	Whampoa 黃埔			Kowloon City	23 October 2016	WHA	
	Ho Man Tin 何文田		Tuen Ma line	Kowloon City	23 October 2016	HOM	
	Yau Ma Tei 油麻地 formerly Waterloo		Tsuen Wan line	Yau Tsim Mong	22 December 1979	YMT	
	Mong Kok 旺角 formerly Argyle		Tsuen Wan line	Yau Tsim Mong	31 December 1979	MOK	
	Prince Edward 太子		Tsuen Wan line	Yau Tsim Mong	10 May 1982	PRE	
	Shek Kip Mei 石硤尾			Sham Shui Po	1 October 1979	SKM	
	Kowloon Tong 九龍塘		East Rail line	Sham Shui Po/Kowloon City	1 October 1979	KOT	
	Lok Fu 樂富			Wong Tai Sin	1 October 1979	LOF	
	Wong Tai Sin 黃大仙			Wong Tai Sin	1 October 1979	WTS	
	Diamond Hill 鑽石山		Tuen Ma line	Wong Tai Sin	1 October 1979	DIH	
	Choi Hung 彩虹			Wong Tai Sin/Kwun Tong	1 October 1979	CHH	
	Kowloon Bay 九龍灣			Kwun Tong	1 October 1979	KOB	
	Ngau Tau Kok 牛頭角			Kwun Tong	1 October 1979	NTK	
	Kwun Tong 觀塘			Kwun Tong	1 October 1979	KWT	
	Lam Tin 藍田			Kwun Tong	1 October 1989	LAT	
	Yau Tong 油塘		Tseung Kwan O line	Kwun Tong	4 August 2002	YAT	
	Tiu Keng Leng 調景嶺		Tseung Kwan O line	Sai Kung	18 August 2002	TIK	

== Tsuen Wan line ==
Tsuen Wan line
Livery	Name	Photo	Connections	District	Opened	Code	Notes
	Tsuen Wan 荃灣			Tsuen Wan	10 May 1982	TSW	(Note: Tsuen Wan station of the Tsuen Wan line and Tsuen Wan West station of the Tuen Ma line are not physically linked, but green public light bus route 95K (free transfer with an immediate Tuen Ma line journey record on the Octopus card) connects the two stations. It normally takes 15-20 minutes to go to Tsuen Wan West station on foot.)
	Tai Wo Hau 大窩口			Kwai Tsing/Tsuen Wan	10 May 1982	TWH	
	Kwai Hing 葵興			Kwai Tsing	10 May 1982	KWH	
	Kwai Fong 葵芳			Kwai Tsing	10 May 1982	KWF	
	Lai King 荔景		Tung Chung line	Kwai Tsing	10 May 1982	LAK	
	Mei Foo 美孚 formerly Lai Wan		Tuen Ma line	Sham Shui Po	17 May 1982	MEF	
	Lai Chi Kok 荔枝角			Sham Shui Po	17 May 1982	LCK	
	Cheung Sha Wan 長沙灣			Sham Shui Po	17 May 1982	CSW	
	Sham Shui Po 深水埗			Sham Shui Po	17 May 1982	SSP	
	Prince Edward 太子		Kwun Tong line	Yau Tsim Mong	10 May 1982	PRE	
	Mong Kok 旺角 formerly Argyle		Kwun Tong line	Yau Tsim Mong	31 December 1979	MOK	
	Yau Ma Tei 油麻地 formerly Waterloo		Kwun Tong line	Yau Tsim Mong	22 December 1979	YMT	
	Jordan 佐敦			Yau Tsim Mong	16 December 1979	JOR	
	Tsim Sha Tsui 尖沙咀		Transfer to Tuen Ma line via East Tsim Sha Tsui station	Yau Tsim Mong	16 December 1979	TST	
	Admiralty 金鐘		Island line South Island line East Rail line	Central and Western	12 February 1980	ADM	
	Central 中環 formerly Chater		Island line Transfer to Tung Chung line and Airport Express via Hong Kong station	Central and Western	12 February 1980	CEN	

== Island line ==
Island line
Livery	Name	Photo	Connections	District	Opened	Code
	Kennedy Town 堅尼地城			Central and Western district	28 December 2014	KET
	HKU 香港大學			Central and Western district	28 December 2014	HKU
	Sai Ying Pun 西營盤			Central and Western district	29 March 2015	SYP
	Sheung Wan 上環			Central and Western district	23 May 1986	SHW
	Central 中環 formerly Pedder		Tsuen Wan line Transfer to Tung Chung line and Airport Express via Hong Kong station	Central and Western district	23 May 1986	CEN
	Admiralty 金鐘		Tsuen Wan line South Island line East Rail line	Central and Western district	31 May 1985	ADM
	Wan Chai 灣仔			Wan Chai	31 May 1985	WAC
	Causeway Bay 銅鑼灣			Wan Chai	31 May 1985	CAB
	Tin Hau 天后			Eastern district	31 May 1985	TIH
	Fortress Hill 炮台山			Eastern district	31 May 1985	FOH
	North Point 北角		Tseung Kwan O line	Eastern district	31 May 1985	NOP
	Quarry Bay 鰂魚涌		Tseung Kwan O line	Eastern district	31 May 1985	QUB
	Tai Koo 太古			Eastern district	31 May 1985	TAK
	Sai Wan Ho 西灣河			Eastern district	31 May 1985	SWH
	Shau Kei Wan 筲箕灣			Eastern district	31 May 1985	SKW
	Heng Fa Chuen 杏花邨			Eastern district	31 May 1985	HFC
	Chai Wan 柴灣			Eastern district	31 May 1985	CHW

== Tung Chung line ==
Tung Chung line
Livery	Name	Photo	Connections	District	Opened	Code	Notes
	Tung Chung 東涌		Ngong Ping 360	Islands	22 June 1998	TUC	(Note: Ceremonial opening took place on 21 April 1997, while public opening occurred on 22 April 1997)
	Sunny Bay 欣澳		Disneyland Resort line	Tsuen Wan	1 June 2005	SUN	
	Tsing Yi 青衣		Airport Express	Kwai Tsing	22 June 1998	TSY	
	Lai King 荔景		Tsuen Wan line	Kwai Tsing	22 June 1998	LAK	
	Nam Cheong 南昌		Tuen Ma line	Sham Shui Po	16 December 2003	NAC	
	Olympic 奧運			Yau Tsim Mong	22 June 1998	OLY	
	Kowloon 九龍		Airport Express	Yau Tsim Mong	22 June 1998	KOW	(Note: Kowloon station of the Tung Chung line and Airport Express and Austin station of the Tuen Ma line are not physically connected. There is pedestrian transfer via a footbridge; the journey time is approximately 10 minutes on foot.)
	Hong Kong 香港		Airport Express; Transfer to Tsuen Wan line and Island line via Central station	Central and Western	22 June 1998	HOK	

== Airport Express ==
Airport Express
Livery	Name	Photo	Connections	District	Opened	Code	Notes
	AsiaWorld–Expo 博覽館			Islands	20 December 2005	AWE	
	Airport 機場			Islands	6 July 1998	AIR	
	Tsing Yi 青衣		Tung Chung line	Kwai Tsing	6 July 1998	TSY	
	Kowloon 九龍		Tung Chung line	Yau Tsim Mong	6 July 1998	KOW	
	Hong Kong 香港		Tung Chung line Transfer to Tsuen Wan line and Island line via Central station	Central and Western	6 July 1998	HOK	

== Tseung Kwan O line ==
Tseung Kwan O line
Livery	Name	Photo	Connections	District	Opened	Code
	Po Lam 寶琳			Sai Kung	18 August 2002	POA
	Hang Hau 坑口			Sai Kung	18 August 2002	HAH
	LOHAS Park 康城			Sai Kung	26 July 2009	LHP
	Tseung Kwan O 將軍澳			Sai Kung	18 August 2002	TKO
	Tiu Keng Leng 調景嶺		Kwun Tong line	Sai Kung	18 August 2002	TIK
	Yau Tong 油塘		Kwun Tong line	Kwun Tong	4 August 2002	YAT
	Quarry Bay 鰂魚涌		Island line	Eastern	6 August 1989	QUB
	North Point 北角		Island line	Eastern	27 September 2001	NOP

== Tuen Ma line ==
Tuen Ma line
Livery	Name	Photo	Connections	District	Opened	Code	Notes
	Wu Kai Sha 烏溪沙			Sha Tin	21 December 2004	WKS	
	Ma On Shan 馬鞍山			Sha Tin	21 December 2004	MOS	
	Heng On 恆安			Sha Tin	21 December 2004	HEO	
	Tai Shui Hang 大水坑			Sha Tin	21 December 2004	TSH	
	Shek Mun 石門			Sha Tin	21 December 2004	SHM	
	City One 第一城			Sha Tin	21 December 2004	CIO	
	Sha Tin Wai 沙田圍			Sha Tin	21 December 2004	STW	
	Che Kung Temple 車公廟			Sha Tin	21 December 2004	CKT	
	Tai Wai 大圍		East Rail line	Sha Tin	21 December 2004	TAW	
	Hin Keng 顯徑			Sha Tin	14 February 2020	HIK	
	Diamond Hill 鑽石山		Kwun Tong line	Wong Tai Sin	14 February 2020	DIH	
	Kai Tak 啟德			Kowloon City	14 February 2020	KAT	
	Sung Wong Toi 宋皇臺			Kowloon City	27 June 2021	SUW	
	To Kwa Wan 土瓜灣			Kowloon City	27 June 2021	TKW	
	Ho Man Tin 何文田		Kwun Tong line	Kowloon City	27 June 2021	HOM	
	Hung Hom 紅磡 formerly Kowloon		East Rail line	Yau Tsim Mong/Kowloon City	30 November 1975	HUH	
	East Tsim Sha Tsui 尖東		Transfer to Tsuen Wan line via Tsim Sha Tsui station	Yau Tsim Mong	24 October 2004	ETS	
	Austin 柯士甸			Yau Tsim Mong	16 August 2009	AUS	
	Nam Cheong 南昌		Tung Chung line	Sham Shui Po	20 December 2003	NAC	
	Mei Foo 美孚		Tsuen Wan line	Sham Shui Po	20 December 2003	MEF	
	Tsuen Wan West 荃灣西			Tsuen Wan	20 December 2003	TWW	(Note: Tsuen Wan West station of the Tuen Ma line and Tsuen Wan station of the Tsuen Wan line are not physically linked, but green public light bus route 95K (free transfer with an immediate Tuen Ma line journey record on the Octopus card) connects the two stations. It normally takes 15-20 minutes to go to Tsuen Wan station on foot.)
	Kam Sheung Road 錦上路			Yuen Long	20 December 2003	KSR	
	Yuen Long 元朗		Transfer to Light Rail 610 614 615 761P at Yuen Long stop	Yuen Long	20 December 2003	YUL	
	Long Ping 朗屏			Yuen Long	20 December 2003	LOP	
	Tin Shui Wai 天水圍		Transfer to Light Rail 705 706 751 751P at Tin Shui Wai stop	Yuen Long	20 December 2003	TIS	
	Siu Hong 兆康		Transfer to Light Rail 505 610 614 614P 615 615P 751 at Siu Hong stop	Tuen Mun	20 December 2003	SIH	
	Tuen Mun 屯門		Transfer to Light Rail 505 507 751 at Tuen Mun stop	Tuen Mun	20 December 2003	TUM	

== Disneyland Resort line ==
Disneyland Resort line
Livery	Name	Photo	Connections	District	Opened	Code
	Disneyland Resort 迪士尼			Tsuen Wan	1 August 2005	DIS
	Sunny Bay 欣澳		Tung Chung line	Tsuen Wan	1 August 2005	SUN

== South Island line ==
South Island line
Livery	Name	Photo	Connections	District	Opened	Code
	South Horizons 海怡半島			Southern	28 December 2016	SOH
	Lei Tung 利東			Southern	28 December 2016	LET
	Wong Chuk Hang 黃竹坑			Southern	28 December 2016	WCH
	Ocean Park 海洋公園			Southern	28 December 2016	OCP
	Admiralty 金鐘		Tsuen Wan line Island line East Rail line	Central and Western	12 February 1980	ADM
