= Kwun Tong line =

Hong Kong MTR railway line

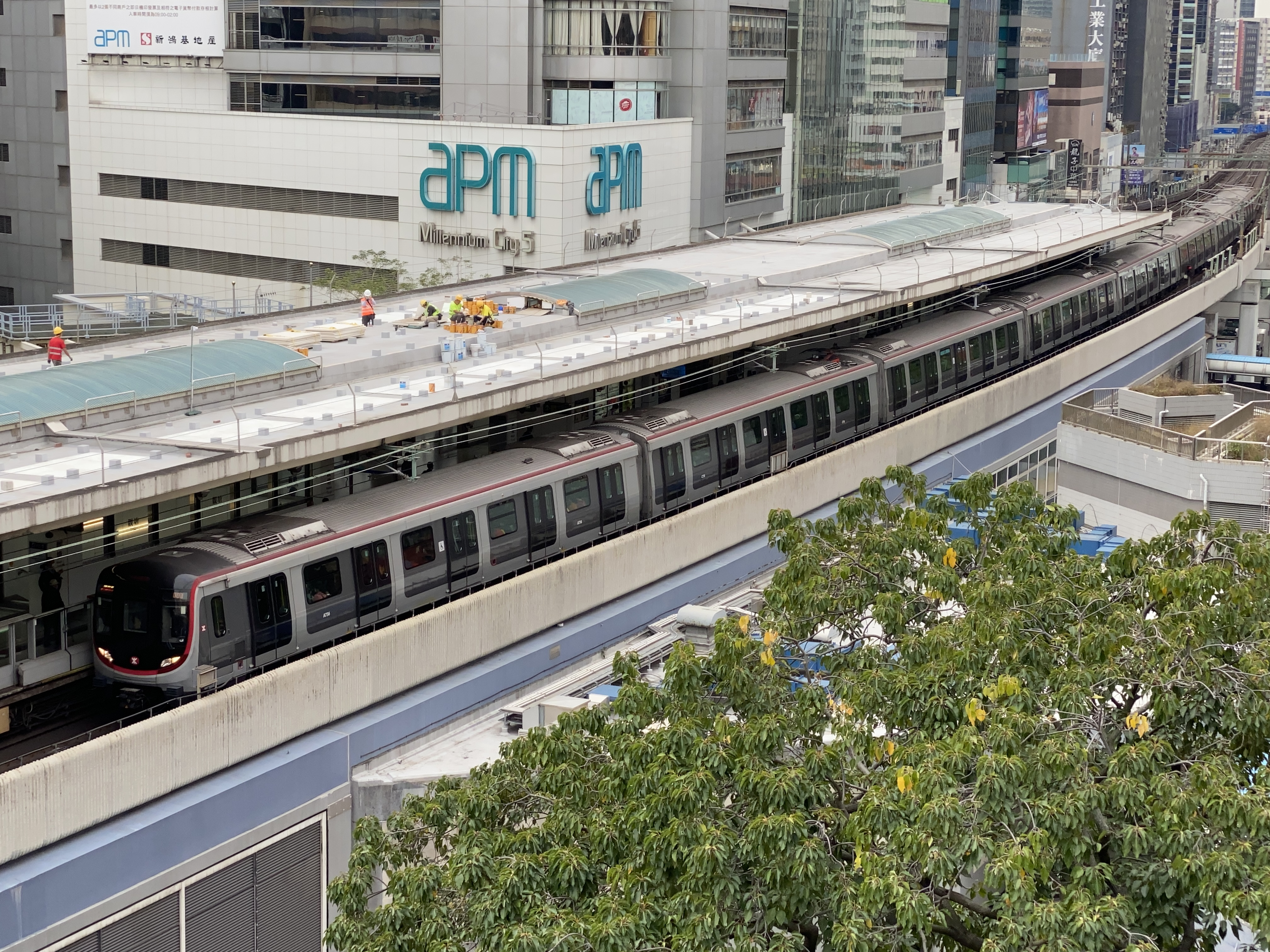
- A CRRC Qingdao Sifang EMU (Q Train) approaching Kwun Tong

Overview
- Native name: 觀塘綫
- Status: Operational
- Owner: MTR Corporation
- Locale: Districts: Kowloon City, Yau Tsim Mong, Sham Shui Po, Kowloon City, Wong Tai Sin, Kwun Tong, Sai Kung, Tseung Kwan O
- Termini: Tiu Keng Leng; Whampoa
- Connecting lines: Tsuen Wan line Via Prince Edward, Mong Kok, Yau Ma Tei; East Rail line Via Kowloon Tong; Tuen Ma line Via Diamond Hill, Ho Man Tin; Tseung Kwan O line Via Yau Tong, Tiu Keng Leng
- Former connections: Island line
- Stations: 17
- Color on map: Green (#00AB4E)

Service
- Type: Rapid transit
- System: MTR
- Operator: MTR Corporation
- Depot: Kowloon Bay
- Rolling stock: Metro Cammell EMU (DC); CNR Changchun EMU; CRRC Qingdao Sifang EMU
- Ridership: 604,600 daily average (weekdays, September 2014)

History
- Work began: 11 November 1975; 50 years ago
- Opened: 1 October 1979; 47 years ago
- Last extension: 23 October 2016; 10 years ago (Kwun Tong line extension) (Ho Man Tin-Whampoa)

Technical
- Line length: 17,321 m (10.763 mi)
- Track length: 18.4 km (11.4 mi)
- Track gauge: 1,432 mm (4 ft 8 3/8 in)
- Electrification: 1,500 V DC (overhead line)
- Operating speed: 33 km/h (21 mph) (average); 80 km/h (50 mph) (maximum)
- Signalling: Advanced SelTrac CBTC (future)
- Train protection system: SACEM (currently being replaced)
Route map

Kwun Tong line
- Traditional Chinese: 觀塘綫
- Simplified Chinese: 观塘线
Transcriptions
Standard Mandarin
- Hanyu Pinyin: Guāntáng xiàn
Yue: Cantonese
- Yale Romanization: gūn tòhng sin
- Jyutping: gun1 tong4 sin3

The Kwun Tong line (Chinese: 觀塘綫) is a rapid transit line of the MTR network in Hong Kong. Starting at Whampoa in Hung Hom and ending at Tiu Keng Leng in Tseung Kwan O, Sai Kung, the route has 17 stations and takes 35 minutes to complete. The Kwun Tong line is one of the busiest railway lines on the network connecting the central and the eastern portions of Kowloon via Wong Tai Sin. The line is mostly underground, but includes a lengthy elevated section, and runs generally in an east-west direction. During the morning rush hour, the Kwun Tong line utilises 33 trains running at 29tph (trains per hour) to achieve a route capacity of 85,000 pphpd (passengers per hour per direction).

Opened on 1 October 1979 as the first urban railway line in Hong Kong and the first operated by the Mass Transit Railway Corporation (MTRC), the Kwun Tong line operates over much of the original section of the "Modified Initial System", from Shek Kip Mei to Kwun Tong station, which it is named after. The line has seen the most changes in alignment of all the MTR lines, the most recent in 2016. It has crossed Victoria Harbour to serve Hong Kong Island using two separate routes in its history, though other lines have since taken over the harbour crossings. As such, the current route lies entirely within Kowloon except for Tiu Keng Leng in the New Territories. It has interchanges with four other lines: the Tsuen Wan line at Yau Ma Tei, Mong Kok and Prince Edward stations, the East Rail line at Kowloon Tong station, the Tuen Ma line at Ho Man Tin and Diamond Hill stations, and the Tseung Kwan O line at Yau Tong and Tiu Keng Leng stations.

== Route map ==
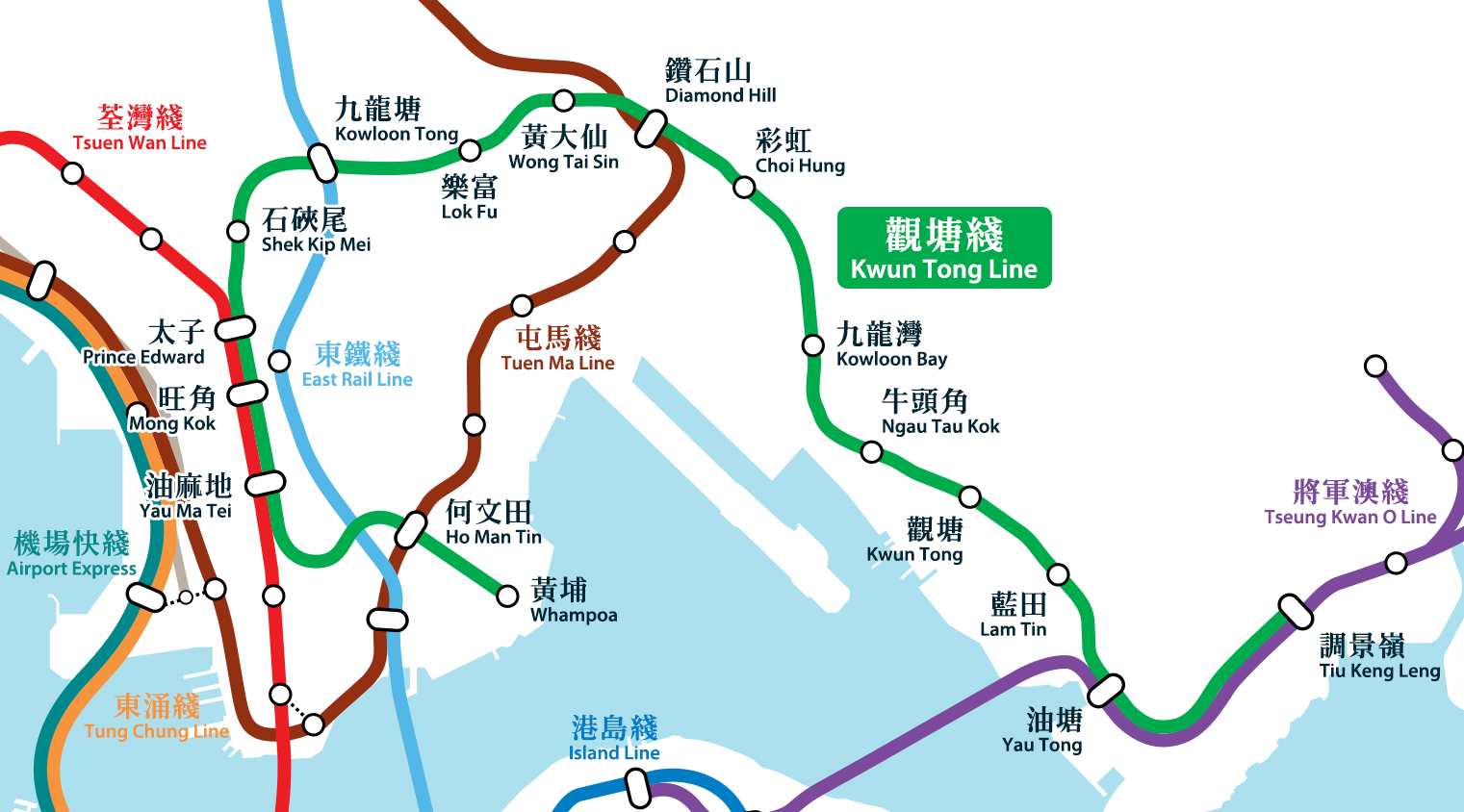
Geographically accurate map of the Kwun Tong line

== History ==
=== Initial section ===
The Kwun Tong line operates over the majority of the track used by the "Modified Initial System", and can so be said to be the first MTR line to enter service. It was predated only by the suburban East Rail line, which at the time was in the process of being electrified and upgraded to a commuter service as part of the Kowloon–Canton Railway. Construction was approved in November 1975 under the administration of Governor Murray MacLehose, and service commenced on 1 October 1979. The line initially ran between Shek Kip Mei station and Kwun Tong station, and each train consisted of four cars. The trains were expanded to consist of 6 cars and 8 cars later respectively. It was extended to the south twice: firstly to Tsim Sha Tsui on 31 December 1979, and secondly to Central station on 12 February 1980 (named Chater at the time), crossing Victoria Harbour through the first underwater rail tunnel in Hong Kong and completing the original Modified Initial System plan.

Three different cross-platform transfers are set up at the three common stations of the Kwun Tong and Tsuen Wan Lines.

When the Tsuen Wan line started service in May 1982, it took over the section of the Modified Initial System south of Argyle (present-day Mong Kok). At that point, Waterloo (present-day Yau Ma Tei) station became the terminus of the newly christened Kwun Tong line (until then, the line had no official name), and both Argyle and Prince Edward stations became cross-platform interchange stations with the new line.

=== Eastern extension ===
When the Hong Kong government decided to build a second harbour crossing in 1984, it awarded a franchise for the construction of a mixed rail and road tunnel under the harbour. Consequentially, the Kwun Tong line was extended through the new tunnel on 6 August 1989 to a new terminus at Quarry Bay, a transfer station with the newly built Island line. An intermediate station, Lam Tin, was opened on 1 October of the same year.

The first derailment in MTR history (excluding ex-KCR lines) took place at Kowloon Bay station in 1994. The seventh carriage of a train pulling into the station at about 60 km/h (37 mph) jumped the tracks on 28 January 1994, on a section of track adjacent to the MTR headquarters building. Nobody was injured, though train services were disrupted. The incident was blamed on a bolt in the train's suspension system which had worked itself loose, causing the weight load to be concentrated on the rear wheels of the carriage.

As part of a project to reduce congestion at Quarry Bay, the Kwun Tong line was briefly extended to North Point on 27 September 2001. This station did not last as the terminus for long, as the newly built Tseung Kwan O line would take over the cross-harbour portion of the route in 2002. On 18 August 2002, The Kwun Tong line was extended to Tiu Keng Leng, its present eastern terminus, coinciding with the opening of the Tseung Kwan O line.

Although not in regular service, the original tunnel linking the Kwun Tong line to the Eastern Harbour Crossing continues to be maintained and can be utilised in the event of a disruption on the Tseung Kwan O line. Such an incident occurred on 16 December 2013, when a train on the Tseung Kwan O line broke down, halting train services on the entire line for several hours. To prevent cross-harbour train service from being disrupted, all Kwun Tong line trains temporarily used the old tracks from Lam Tin to Quarry Bay and terminated at North Point, as they did before the opening of the Tseung Kwan O line. This was the first time since 2002 that the Lam Tin to Quarry Bay tracks were utilised for regular service.

"Modified Initial System", an early form of Kwun Tong line between 1979–80

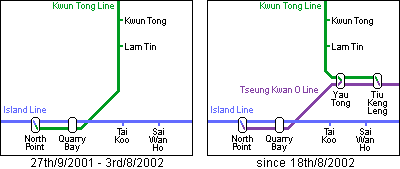
Realignment of Kwun Tong line upon the inauguration of Tseung Kwan O line.

=== Western extension ===
As part of its bid for Sha Tin to Central Link (SCL) in the early 2000s, the MTR Corporation proposed an extension of the Kwun Tong line to serve the Whampoa Garden area, with an interchange at Ho Man Tin to an extended Ma On Shan line, which would provide an alternate route to the Tsuen Wan line across Victoria Harbour to Central South station. Its competitor, the Kowloon-Canton Railway Corporation, suggested constructing an Automated People Mover between Hung Hom and Whampoa instead.

After the MTR–KCR merger in 2007, the Hong Kong government appointed the MTRC to construct the SCL between Tai Wai and Hung Hom according to the KCRC's modified proposal, which would see the Ma On Shan and West Rail lines merged to form the Tuen Ma line, while also extending the Kwun Tong line to Whampoa as per the MTRC's own proposal. The benefits would be a better transfer arrangement at Ho Man Tin and other SCL interchange stations for services to the northeastern and northwestern New Territories. Passengers would be able to change to the North-South corridor at Hung Hom for cross-harbour services, which would terminate at Admiralty after Central South station was removed from the final plan.

The 2.6-kilometre (1.6 mi) Kwun Tong line extension (abbreviated KTE; Chinese: 觀塘綫延綫; Jyutping: Gun1 Tong4 Sin3 Jin4 Sin3) from Yau Ma Tei to Whampoa via Ho Man Tin began construction on 25 July 2011 and opened for service on 23 October 2016. Because of capacity limitations due to the single platform at Whampoa, half of all Whampoa-bound trains terminate at Ho Man Tin during peak hours; all trains terminate at Whampoa during off-peak hours.

A further extension of the Kwun Tong line to Hong Kong Island was also proposed in RDS-2000 to constitute the fifth harbour crossing.

== Rolling stock ==
MTR Kwun Tong line Rolling stock
Model	Manufactured	Time of manufacturing	Sets	Assembly	Notes
M-Train	Metro-Cammell	1977–1994	14	A-C+D+B-C+D+C-A	Limited use only. 7 sets are used on the Tseung Kwan O Line while 13 were transferred to the Island Line.
C-Train	CNR Changchun	2010-2013	22	A-C-B+B-C+B-C-A
Q-Train	CRRC Qingdao Sifang	2017–present	16	A-C-B+B-C+B-C-A
MTR Kwun Tong line Former rolling stock
Model	Manufactured	Time in operation	Sets	Assembly	Notes
K-Train	Hyundai Rotem and Mitsubishi Heavy Industries	26/04/2002–04/2010	13	A-C-B+B-C+B-C-A	Now used on Tseung Kwan O line

== Route description ==
The Kwun Tong line is mostly underground and runs generally east-west. It starts at Whampoa station and heads northwest, with an interchange to the Tuen Ma line at Ho Man Tin. It curves to the southwest and then north to meet the Tsuen Wan line at Yau Ma Tei, with the Tsuen Wan line platforms above the Kwun Tong Line platforms. At this point, the line runs underneath Nathan Road alongside the Tsuen Wan line, with stations at Mong Kok and Prince Edward providing cross-platform interchanges.

The Kwun Tong line then splits from the Tsuen Wan line and turns to the east after Shek Kip Mei. At Kowloon Tong, there is an important, widely used interchange with the suburban East Rail line. Continuing eastwards through Wong Tai Sin, the line interchanges with the Tuen Ma line again at Diamond Hill, after which it turns south and emerges above ground after Choi Hung station. It then runs southeast on a viaduct above Kwun Tong Road between Kowloon Bay and Lam Tin stations.

After Lam Tin station, the line travels through a tunnel in a hill and emerges above ground level at Yau Tong (although the line is completely covered at this point), where it meets with the Tseung Kwan O line. Both the Kwun Tong and Tseung Kwan O lines pass beneath the Tseung Kwan O cemetery in tunnel before entering Tseung Kwan O in an northeasterly direction and eventually terminating at Tiu Keng Leng station. Yau Tong and Tiu Keng Leng stations provide cross-platform interchanges in the same manner as Mong Kok and Prince Edward. Expansions for the Kwun Tong line to the east have been made impossible due to the building structure of Tseung Kwan O station, just mere meters ahead from the end of the Kwun Tong line tunnels.

== Stations ==
This is a list of the stations on the Kwun Tong line.

List

Livery	Station Name		Length (km)	Images	Interchange; Adjacent transportation	Opening	District
Livery	English	Chinese	Length (km)	Images	Interchange; Adjacent transportation	Opening	District
Kwun Tong Line (KTL)
	Whampoa	黃埔	0.0		—	23 October 2016; 10 years ago	Kowloon City
	Ho Man Tin	何文田	0.8		Tuen Ma line	23 October 2016; 10 years ago	Kowloon City
	Yau Ma Tei (Note: This station was formerly known as Waterloo when opened)	油麻地	2.6		Tsuen Wan line towards Central (Tiu Keng Leng Direction)	22 December 1979; 46 years ago	Yau Tsim Mong
	Mong Kok (Note: This station was formerly known as Argyle when opened)	旺角	3.4		Tsuen Wan line towards Central (Whampoa Direction) and towards Tsuen Wan (Tiu Keng Leng direction)	31 December 1979; 46 years ago	Yau Tsim Mong
	Prince Edward	太子	4.0		Tsuen Wan line towards Tsuen Wan (Whampoa direction)	10 May 1982; 44 years ago	Yau Tsim Mong
	Shek Kip Mei	石硤尾	4.8		—	1 October 1979; 47 years ago	Sham Shui Po
	Kowloon Tong	九龍塘	6.1		East Rail line	1 October 1979; 47 years ago	Kowloon City
	Lok Fu	樂富	7.0		—	1 October 1979; 47 years ago	Wong Tai Sin
	Wong Tai Sin	黃大仙	8.0		—	1 October 1979; 47 years ago	Wong Tai Sin
	Diamond Hill	鑽石山	8.8		Tuen Ma line East Kowloon line (proposed)	1 October 1979; 47 years ago	Wong Tai Sin
	Choi Hung	彩虹	9.7		—	1 October 1979; 47 years ago	Wong Tai Sin
	Kowloon Bay	九龍灣	11.2		—	1 October 1979; 47 years ago	Kwun Tong
	Ngau Tau Kok	牛頭角	12.3		—	1 October 1979; 47 years ago	Kwun Tong
	Kwun Tong	觀塘	13.2		—	1 October 1979; 47 years ago	Kwun Tong
	Lam Tin	藍田	14.1		—	1 October 1989; 37 years ago	Kwun Tong
	Yau Tong	油塘	15.2		Tseung Kwan O line towards North Point	4 August 2002; 24 years ago	Kwun Tong
	Tiu Keng Leng	調景嶺	17.3		Tseung Kwan O line towards Po Lam or LOHAS Park	18 August 2002; 24 years ago	Sai Kung

== See also ==
- East Rail line
- Tseung Kwan O line
- Tsuen Wan line
