= Kwun Tong station =

MTR station in Kowloon, Hong Kong

Kwun Tong 觀塘
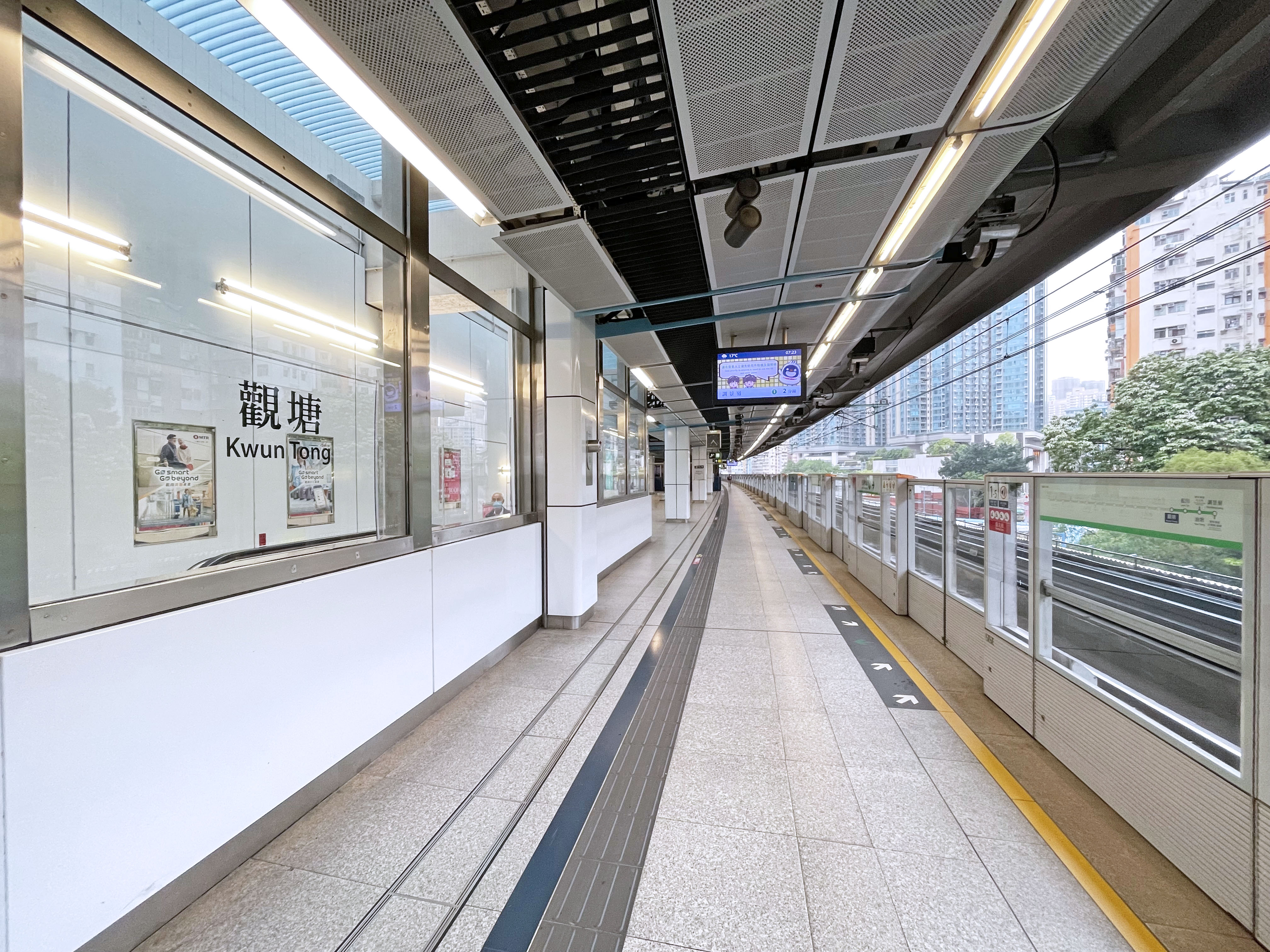
- Platform 1 (2022)

Chinese name
- Traditional Chinese: 觀塘
- Simplified Chinese: 观塘
- Jyutping: Gun1tong4
- Hanyu Pinyin: Guāntáng
- Literal meaning: Pondview
Transcriptions
Standard Mandarin
- Hanyu Pinyin: Guāntáng
Yue: Cantonese
- Yale Romanization: Gūntòhng
- IPA: [kun˥tʰɔŋ˩]
- Jyutping: Gun1tong4

General information
- Location: Kwun Tong Road Interchange, Kwun Tong; Kwun Tong District, Hong Kong
- Coordinates: 22°18′44″N 114°13′35″E
- System: MTR rapid transit station
- Operator: MTR Corporation
- Line: Kwun Tong line
- Platforms: 2 (1 island platform)
- Tracks: 2
- Connections: Bus, minibus

Construction
- Structure type: Elevated
- Platform levels: 1
- Accessible: yes

Other information
- Station code: KWT

History
- Opened: 1 October 1979; 47 years ago
- Electrified: 1,500 V DC (Overhead line)

Services
Preceding station	MTR	Following station
Ngau Tau Kok towards Whampoa	Kwun Tong line	Lam Tin towards Tiu Keng Leng
Ngau Tau Kok towards Whampoa	Kwun Tong line Trains after midnight	Terminus
Track layout
Location
- Location within MTR

Kwun Tong (Chinese: 觀塘; Cantonese Yale: Gūntòhng) is a station on the MTR Kwun Tong line in Hong Kong. The station opened on 1 October 1979 as the eastern terminus of the first phase of the Kwun Tong line until the Eastern Harbour Crossing to Quarry Bay opened on 6 August 1989. It is located in the Kwun Tong area, between Lam Tin and Ngau Tau Kok stations.

The station is elevated and open-air, unlike almost every other station on the line,as nly Ngau Tau Kok and Kowloon Bay stations are like this. Due to difficulties in installing platform screen doors (PSDs) in above ground stations, the MTR decided not to install PSDs in this station, instead installing automatic platform gates (APGs) on the station's platforms in 2011.

A shopping centre and office tower, named apm Millennium City 5, are connected to the station. Beneath the station building is a road tunnel which diverts traffic along Kwun Tong Road from the roundabout around the station.

== History ==
The construction of the station under Contract 212 was awarded to Far East/Coignet joint venture.

Kwun Tong station was opened when the Kwun Tong line was opened on 1 October 1979, and act as the terminus of the system, until Kwun Tong line was extended to Quarry Bay on 6 August 1989.

== Station layout ==
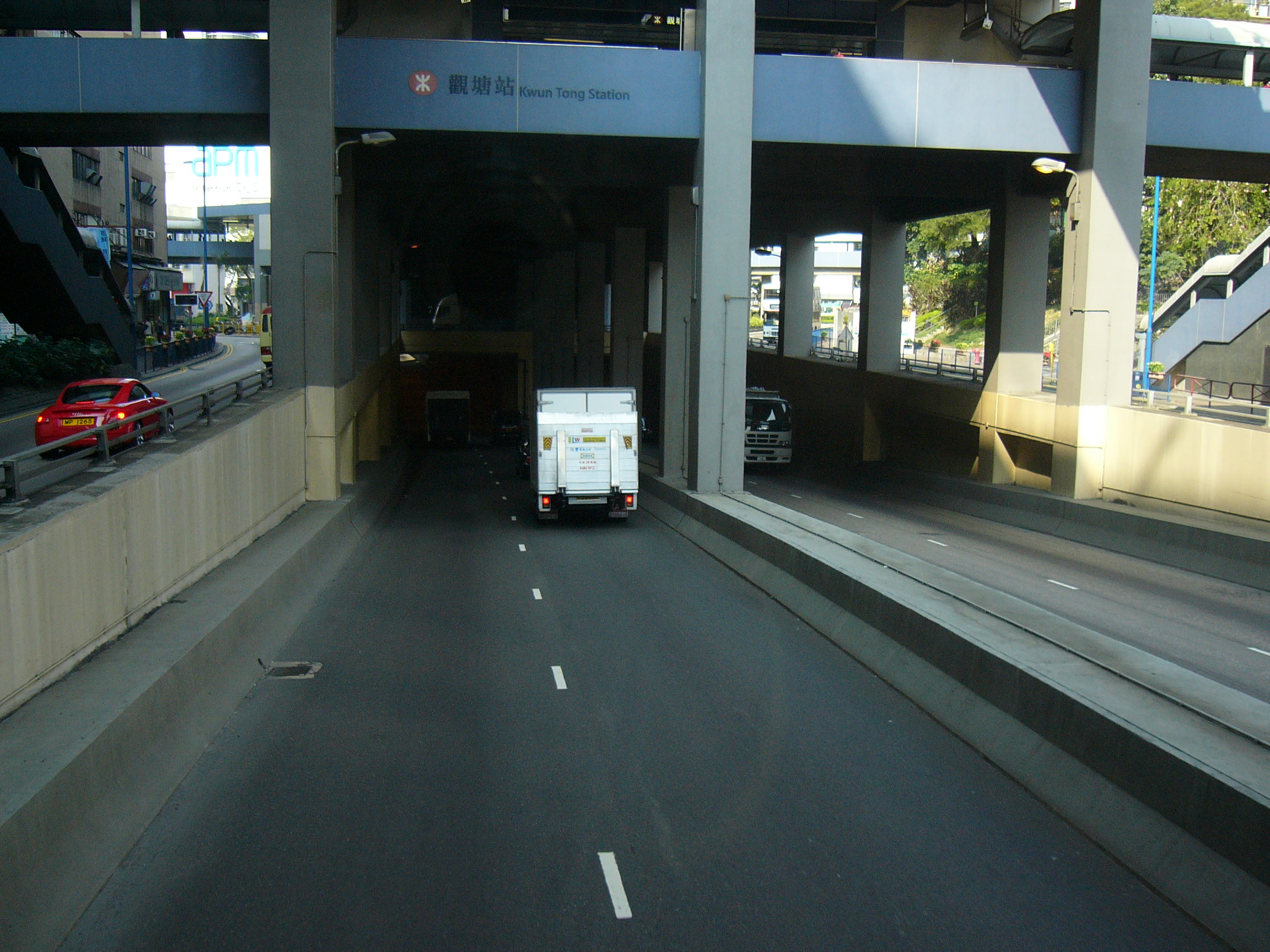
The road tunnel built beneath Kwun Tong station

Platforms 1 and 2 share the same island platform, and it is curved, so the gap is large. Before Lam Tin station was opened, platform 1 was also used for departing westbound trains. After midnight, platform 1 is the termination platform of the Kwun Tong line, so trains can return to Kowloon Bay Depot. Before 07:01, platform 2 is the boarding platform of the Kwun Tong line after trains depart from Kowloon Bay Depot.

U2; Platforms	Platform 1	Kwun Tong line towards Tiu Keng Leng (Lam Tin) →
U2; Platforms	Island platform, doors will open on the right
U2; Platforms	Platform 2	← Kwun Tong line towards Whampoa (Ngau Tau Kok)
U1	Concourse	Customer service, MTRshops
U1	Concourse	Hang Seng Bank, vending machines, automatic teller machines
U1	Concourse	Octopus promotion machine
G	Ground level	Exits
-	-	Kwun Tong Road Tunnel

== Entrances/exits ==
- A1: Yue Man Square
- A2: Millennium City 5, APM Mall
- B1: Kwun Tong Ferry Pier Harbourfront
- B2: Kwun Tong Plaza
- B3: Crocodile Center
- C1: Yuet Wah Street
- C2: Lei Yue Mun Road
- C3: Hip Wo Street
- D1: Bus Terminus
- D2: Hip Wo Street
- D3: Hoi Yuen Road
- D4: Kwun Tong Industrial Centre

== Gallery ==
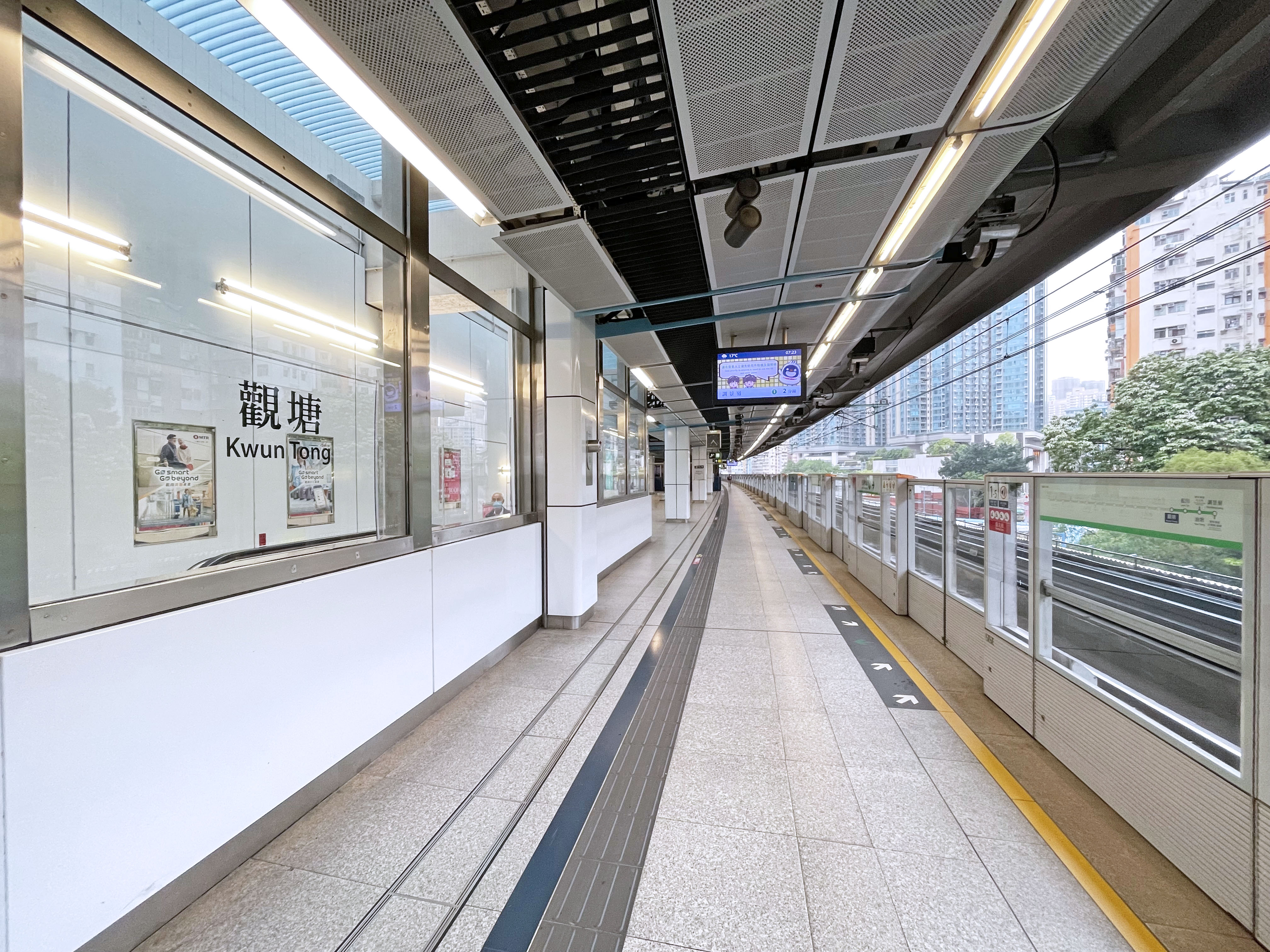
Kwun Tong station platforms (2022)

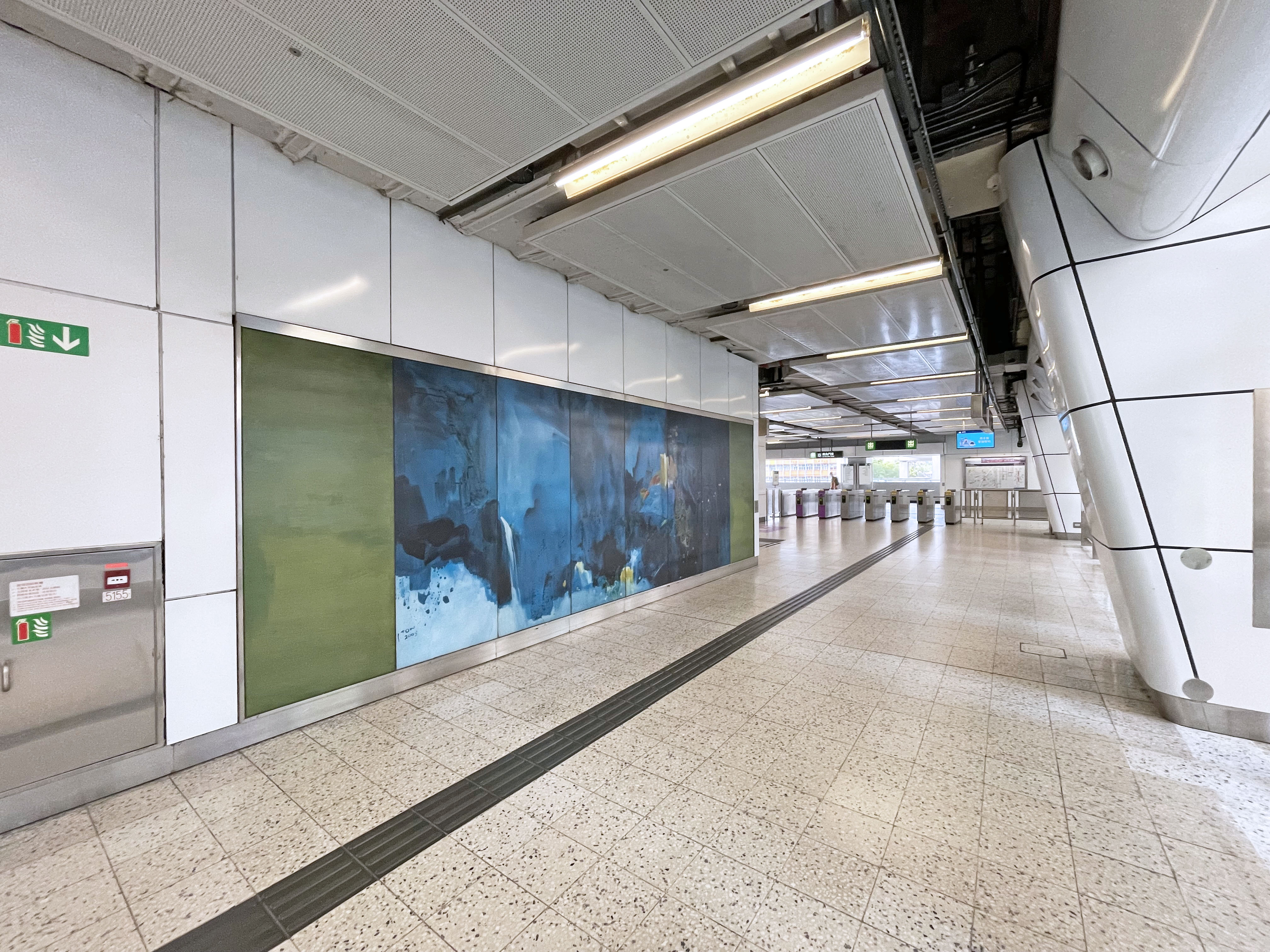
Station concourse (2022)

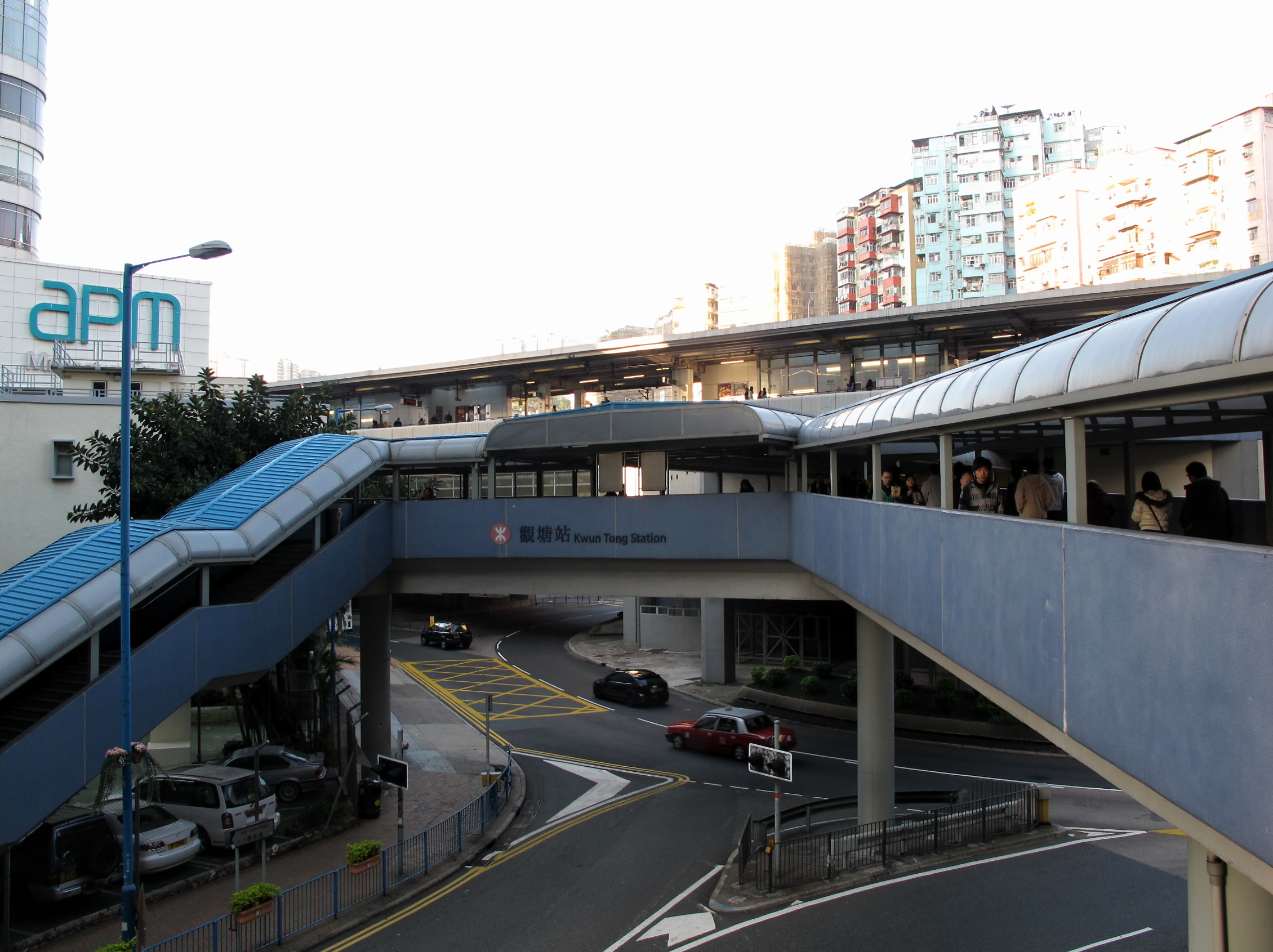
Footbridge access to the station. (2010) The MTR station name on the side of the footbridge has since been removed.

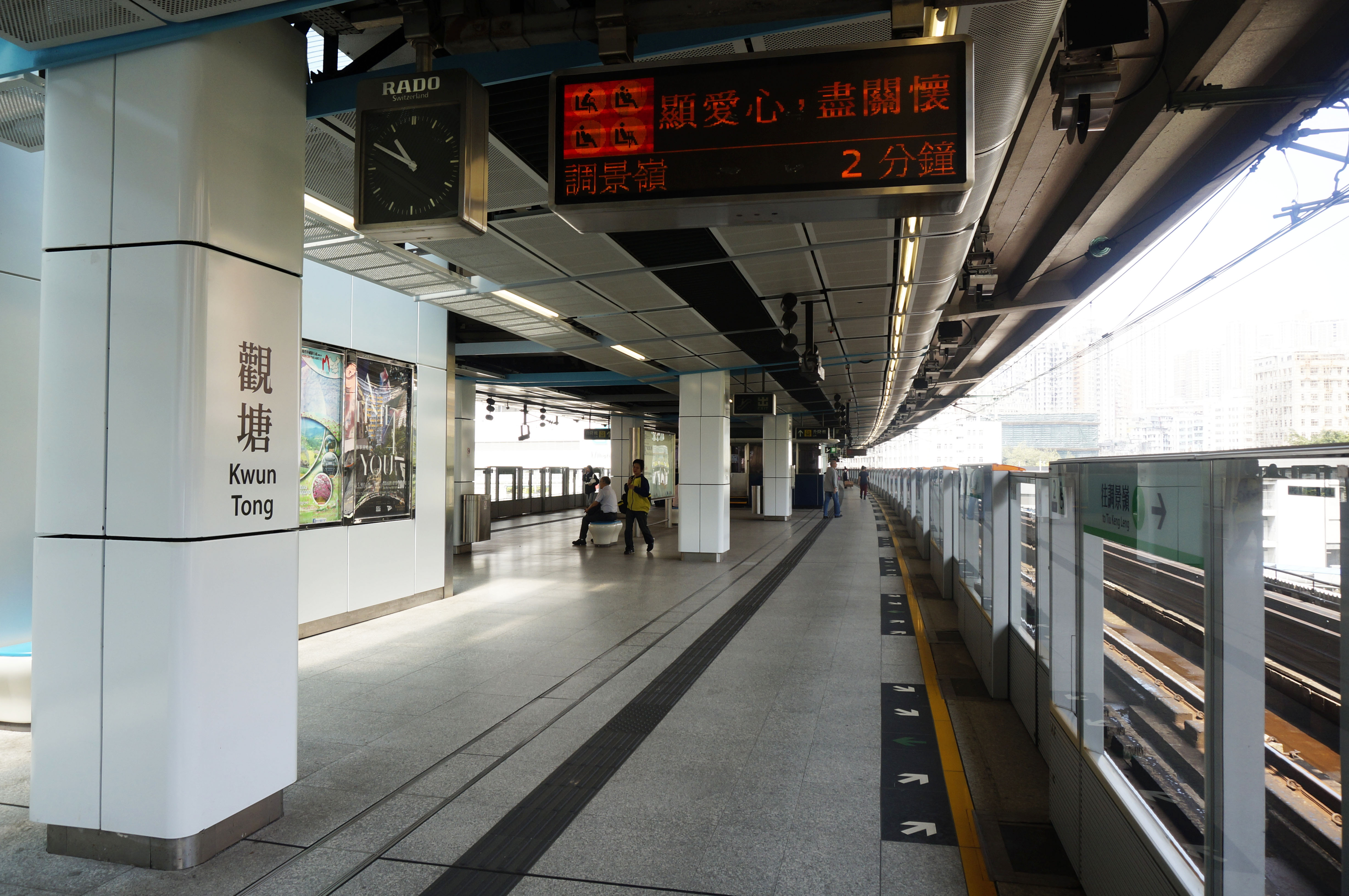
Platform 1 of Kwun Tong station (2014)
