= Tamar station =

Proposed MTR interchange station on Hong Kong Island

Tamar 添馬
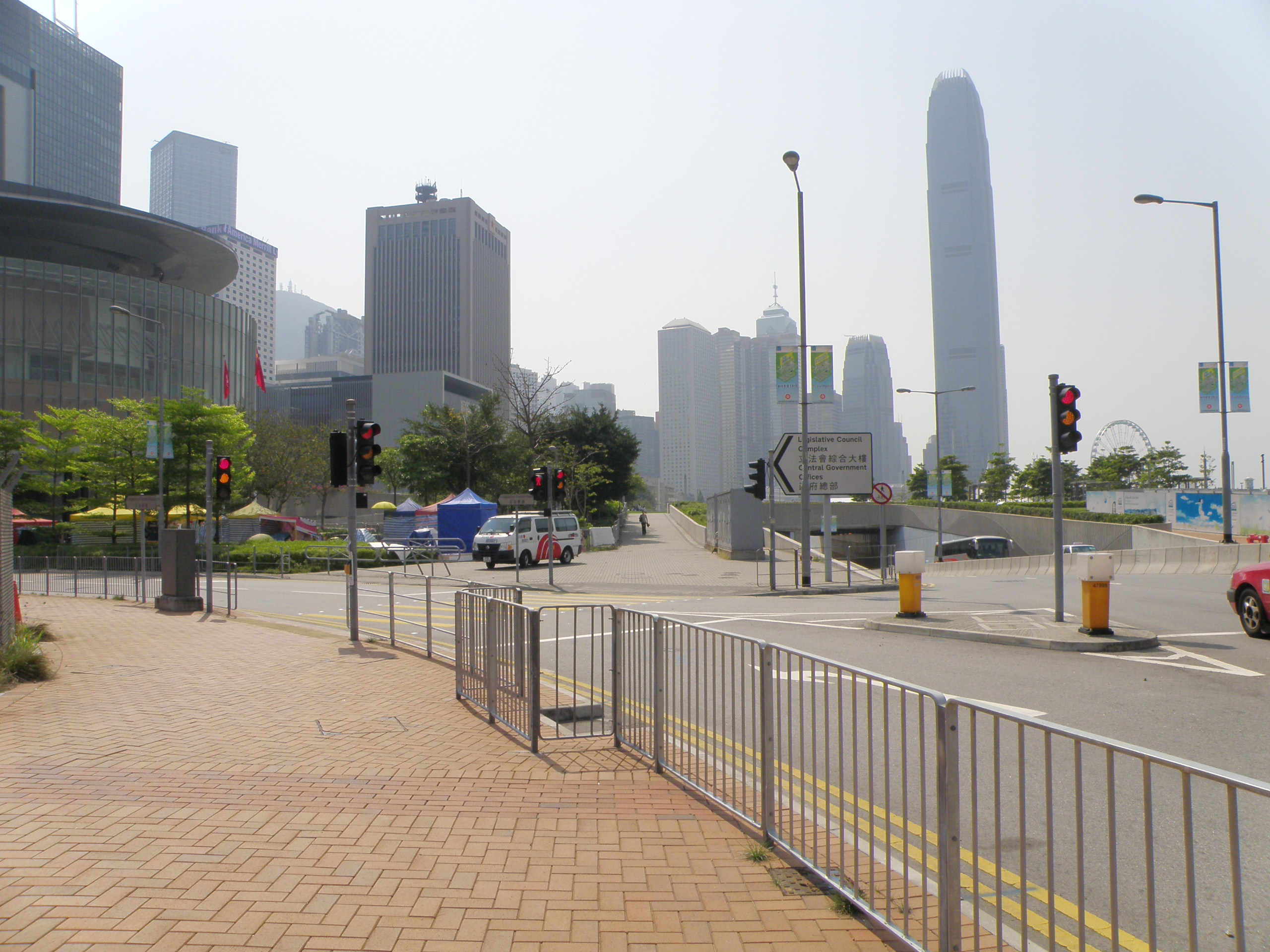
- Proposed station site

Chinese name
- Traditional Chinese: 添馬
- Simplified Chinese: 添马
Transcriptions
Standard Mandarin
- Hanyu Pinyin: Tiānmǎ
Yue: Cantonese
- Yale Romanization: tim1 ma5
- Jyutping: tim1 ma5

General information
- Location: Lung Wo Road × Tim Wa Avenue, Admiralty; Central and Western District, Hong Kong
- Coordinates: 22°16′55″N 114°09′58″E
- System: Proposed MTR rapid transit station
- Owner: MTR Corporation
- Operator: MTR Corporation
- Lines: Tung Chung line (proposed); Tseung Kwan O line (proposed)
- Platforms: 4 (2 island platforms)
- Tracks: 4

Construction
- Structure type: Underground
- Platform levels: 3

Other information
- Station code: TAM

Services
Preceding station	MTR	Following station
Planned (North Island line extension)
Terminus	Tung Chung line (North Island line)	Hong Kong towards Tung Chung West
Terminus	Tseung Kwan O line (North Island line)	Exhibition Centre towards Po Lam or LOHAS Park
Location
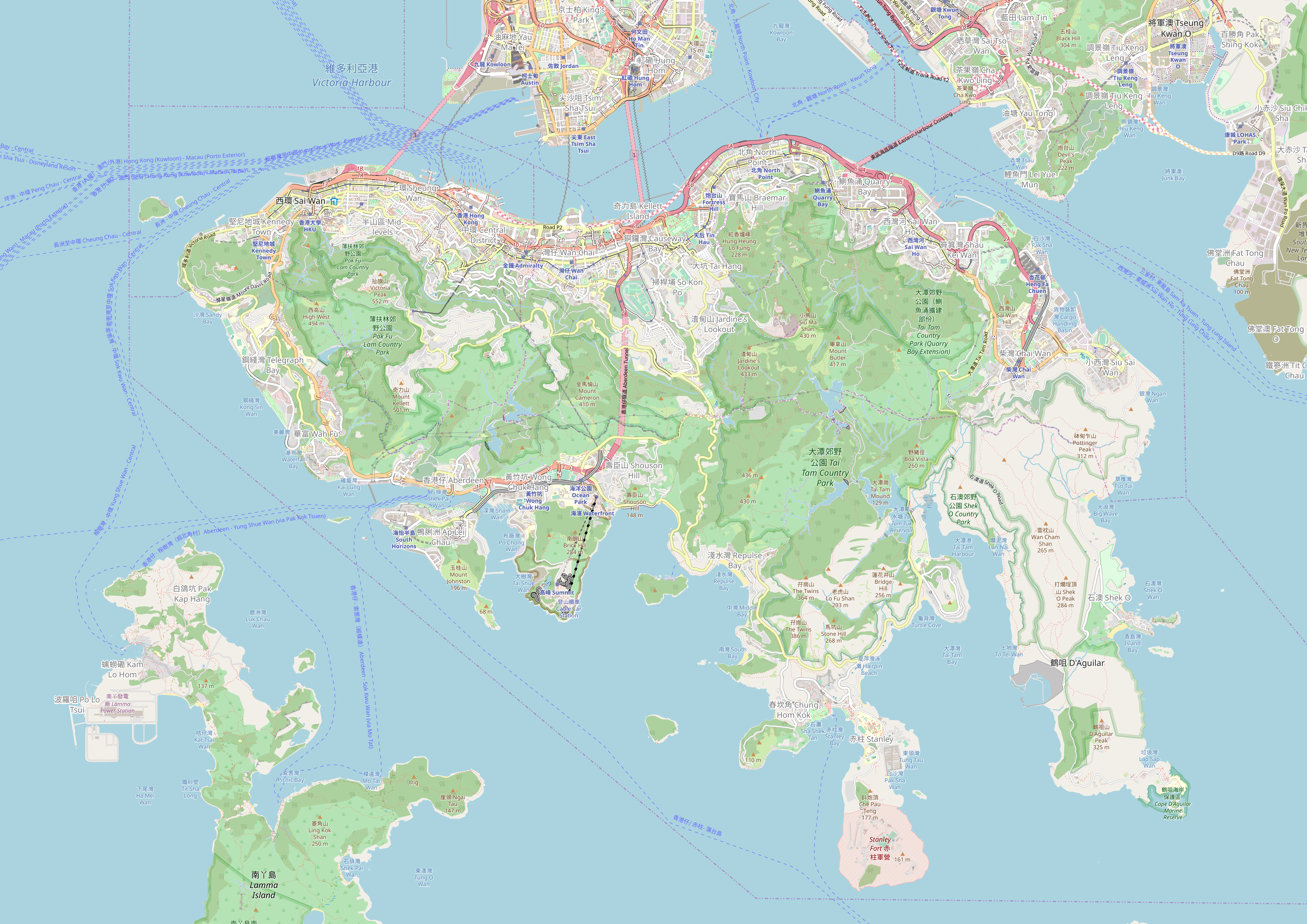
- Location within MTR Location within Hong Kong urban core Location within Hong Kong Island

Tamar (Chinese: 添馬) is a station on MTR's shelved North Island line (NIL) proposal on the north shore of Hong Kong Island. It will be located on the former site of HMS Tamar on Hong Kong Island, Hong Kong. Tamar station will be the eastern terminus of the Tung Chung line and the western terminus of the Tseung Kwan O line. It will also act as a transfer station between the two lines.

According to a 2014 study, it was suggested to start construction of the station in 2021 and open it in 2026. Geographically, the Admiralty MTR station is located to the south, while Tamar Park is located to the north. The station would sit at the foot of the Central Government Complex, directly under Tamar Park.

== History ==
In 2006, the Hong Kong Government was set to implement the Tamar Development Project. The new Government Complex was inaugurated in 2011, but the timetable of the construction of the NIL station was still undecided.

On 21 February 2013, the Highways Department published an improved version of the "Railway Development Strategy." As part of the second phase of public consultation for the North Island line, the department created two proposals: a "swap" scheme and an "interchange" scheme. In the former plan, the North Island line would be split in two lines. The Tung Chung line would extend east from Hong Kong station to serve the new Tamar, Exhibition Centre, and Causeway Bay North stations before using the current Island line track from Fortress Hill to Chai Wan.

Meanwhile, the Tseung Kwan O line would extend west past North Point station to the Island line's Tin Hau station before going along the current Island line to the Kennedy Town station. In the latter, the Tung Chung line would be extended one stop, from Hong Kong to Tamar, while the Tseung Kwan O line would be extended three stops, from North Point to Causeway Bay North, Exhibition (now called Exhibition Centre), and Tamar (with Tamar becoming an interchange station and terminal for the two lines).

The Hong Kong government opted for the "interchange" scheme in 2014, which meant that the Tamar station would be a four-track, two-level station, as opposed to the two-track, one-level station proposed as part of the "swap" scheme.
