= Causeway Bay North station =

Proposed MTR station on Hong Kong Island

Causeway Bay North 銅鑼灣北
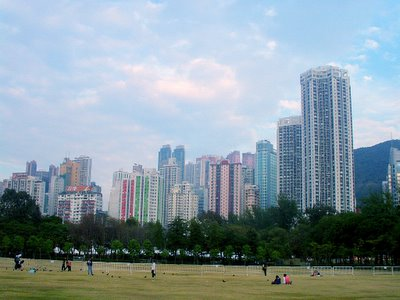
- Victoria Park, Hong Kong

Chinese name
- Traditional Chinese: 銅鑼灣北
- Simplified Chinese: 铜锣湾北
Transcriptions
Standard Mandarin
- Hanyu Pinyin: Tóngluówānběi
Yue: Cantonese
- Yale Romanization: tung4 lo4 waan1 bak1
- Jyutping: tung4 lo4 waan1 bak1

General information
- Location: Causeway Bay; Wan Chai District, Hong Kong
- Coordinates: 22°16′59.99″N 114°11′9.82″E
- System: Proposed MTR rapid transit station
- Owner: MTR Corporation
- Operator: MTR Corporation
- Line: Tseung Kwan O line (proposed)
- Platforms: 2
- Tracks: 2

Construction
- Structure type: Underground

Other information
- Station code: CBN

Services
Preceding station	MTR	Following station
Planned (North Island line extension)
Exhibition Centre towards Tamar	Tseung Kwan O line (North Island line)	North Point towards Po Lam or LOHAS Park
Location
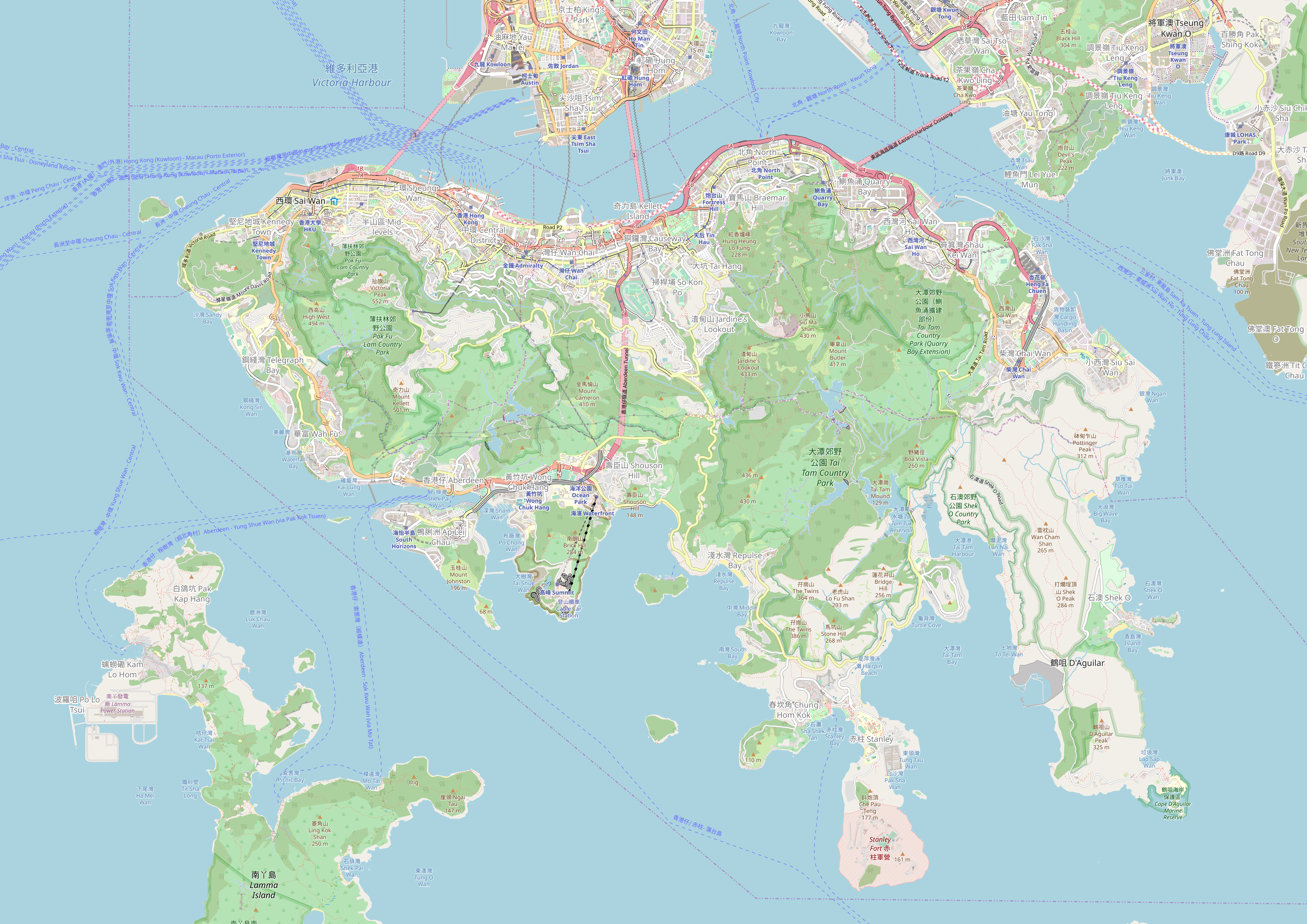
- Location within MTR Location within Hong Kong urban core Location within Hong Kong Island

Causeway Bay North or Victoria Park (Chinese: 銅鑼灣北) is a proposed station of the MTR rapid transit network in Hong Kong, situated in the northern part of Causeway Bay to the northwest of Victoria Park on Hong Kong Island. The station is part of the North Island line (NIL) proposal, which includes the extension of the Tseung Kwan O line from its present North Point terminus to Tamar station in Central.

== History ==
The KCRC also proposed adding Causeway Bay North station as part of the Sha Tin to Central Link (SCL), to be situated between Exhibition Centre and Hung Hom. However, a major drawback was that road traffic would be severely impacted, as this would involve closing Gloucester Road for 5 years. Eventually, the station was eliminated from the SCL plan, after the MTR–KCR merger, and will only be part of the NIL if it is constructed.

In 2013, the name "Causeway Bay North" was mentioned in the Review and Update of the Railway Development Strategy 2000 as an intermediate station on the North Island line, instead of "Victoria Park".

== Station Structure ==
The terminus of the Tseung Kwan O Line is planned to be extended from North Point Station to Tamar Station, where it will intersect with the extended Tung Chung Line, and this station will be set up halfway between the stations. The underground section may pass through Tsing Fung Street flyover and Victoria Park Road.

== See also ==
- North Island line
- Tseung Kwan O line
