= Tseung Kwan O station =

MTR station in the New Territories, Hong Kong

Tseung Kwan O 將軍澳
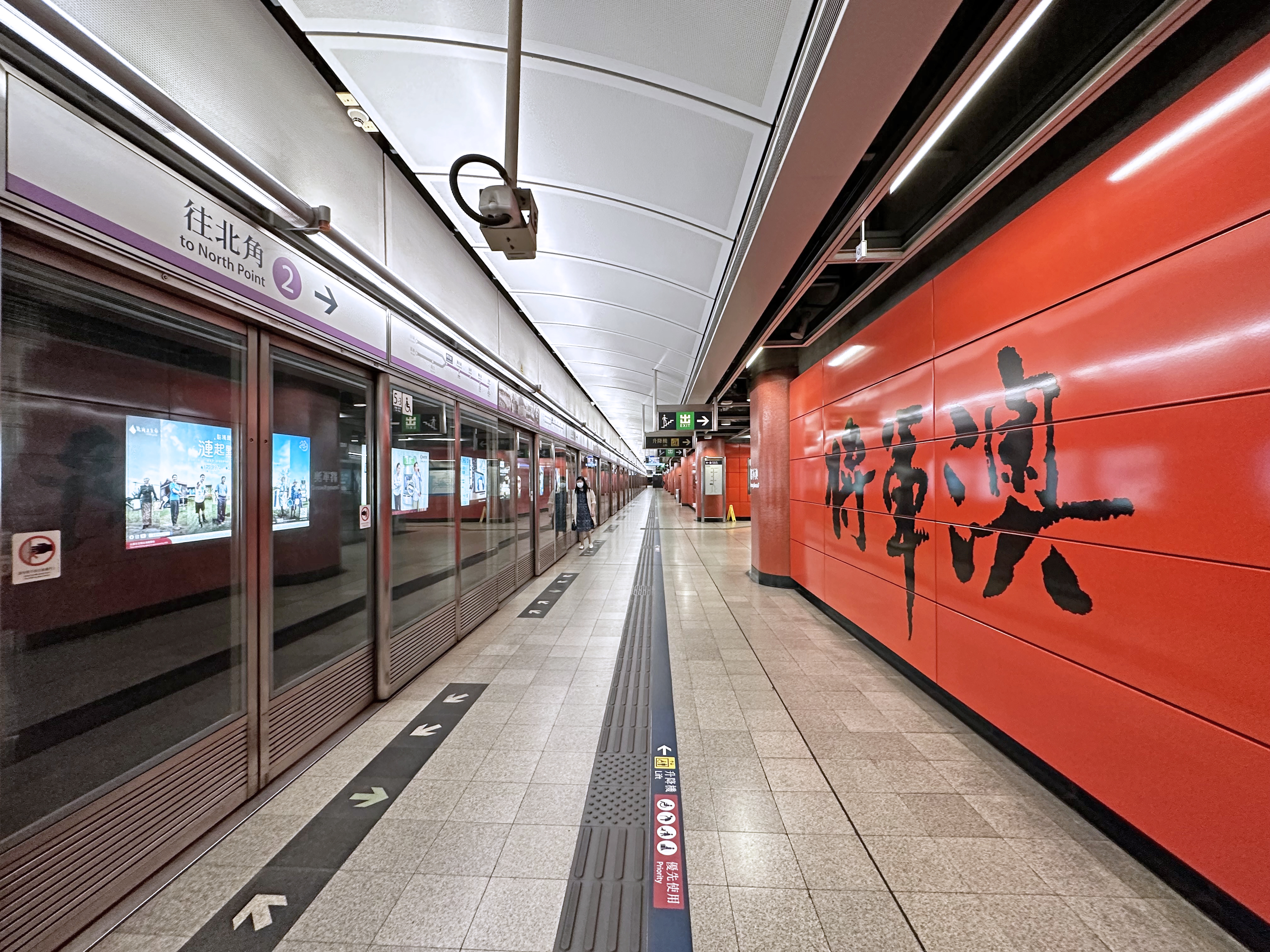
- Station Platform 2

Chinese name
- Traditional Chinese: 將軍澳
- Simplified Chinese: 将军澳
- Literal meaning: General's Bay
Transcriptions
Standard Mandarin
- Hanyu Pinyin: Jiāngjūn'ào
Yue: Cantonese
- Yale Romanization: Jēunggwān'ou
- IPA: [tsœ́ːŋ kʷɐ́n ʔōu]
- Jyutping: Zoeng1gwan1ou3

General information
- Location: Tseung Kwan O Sai Kung District, Hong Kong
- Coordinates: 22°18′27″N 114°15′36″E
- System: MTR rapid transit station
- Owner: MTR Corporation
- Operator: MTR Corporation
- Line: Tseung Kwan O line
- Platforms: 2 (1 island platform)
- Tracks: 2

Construction
- Structure type: Underground
- Accessible: Yes
- Architect: Aedas

Other information
- Station code: TKO

History
- Opened: 18 August 2002; 24 years ago

Services
Preceding station	MTR	Following station
Tiu Keng Leng towards North Point	Tseung Kwan O line	Hang Hau towards Po Lam
Tiu Keng Leng towards North Point	Tseung Kwan O line	LOHAS Park Terminus
Track layout
Location
- Location within MTR

Tseung Kwan O (Chinese: 將軍澳; Cantonese Yale: Jēunggwān'ou; pronounced: [tsœŋ˥kʷɐn˥.ɔw˧]) is a station on the MTR Tseung Kwan O line located at the town centre of the Tseung Kwan O New Town in the New Territories of Hong Kong. The previous station is Tiu Keng Leng and the line splits after this station to LOHAS Park and Hang Hau. The entrances to the station are on Tong Chun Street, Popcorn Mall and Tong Yin Street. A public transport interchange is located outside the station. The architecture firm Aedas designed the station. The station livery is scarlet.

== History ==
Leighton-China State joint venture won the contract for the station.

Tsueng Kwan O station opened to the public on 18 August 2002, together with the spur line to Tsueng Kwan O Depot, right next to LOHAS Park station, but the station did not open until 26 July 2009.

== Station layout ==
G	Concourse	Exits, transport interchange
G	Concourse	Customer service, MTRshops
G	Concourse	Vending machines, automatic teller machines
L1; Platform	Platform 1	Tseung Kwan O line towards Po Lam (Hang Hau) → Tseung Kwan O line towards LOHAS Park (Terminus) →
L1; Platform	Island platform, doors will open on the right
L1; Platform	Platform 2	← Tseung Kwan O line towards North Point (Tiu Keng Leng)

=== Entrances/exits ===
- A1: TKO Spot / Sheung Tak Estate / Transport Interchange
- A2: The Grandiose / Tseung Kwan O Plaza
- B1/B2: Park Central
- C: PopCorn
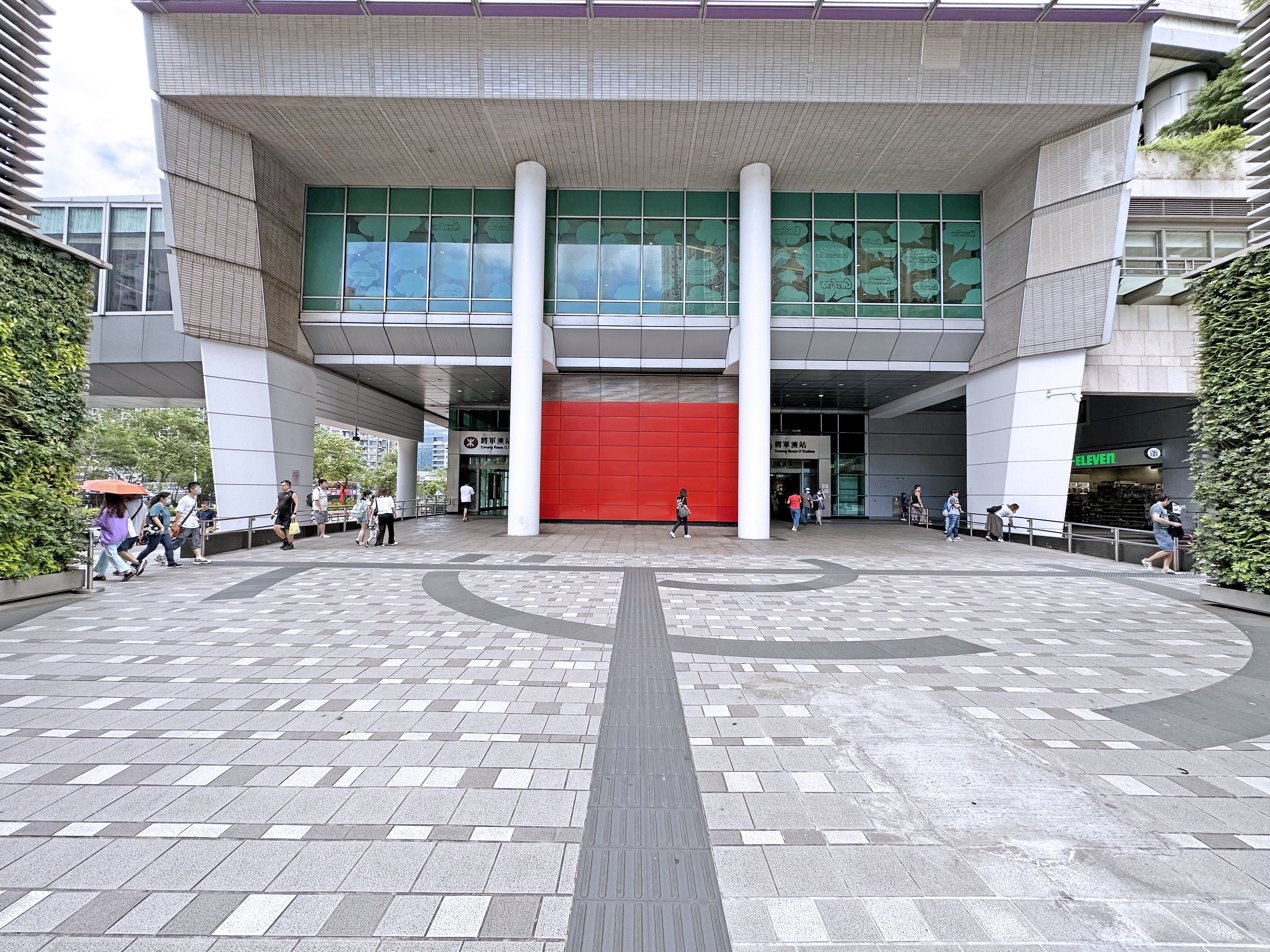
Exits A1 and A2

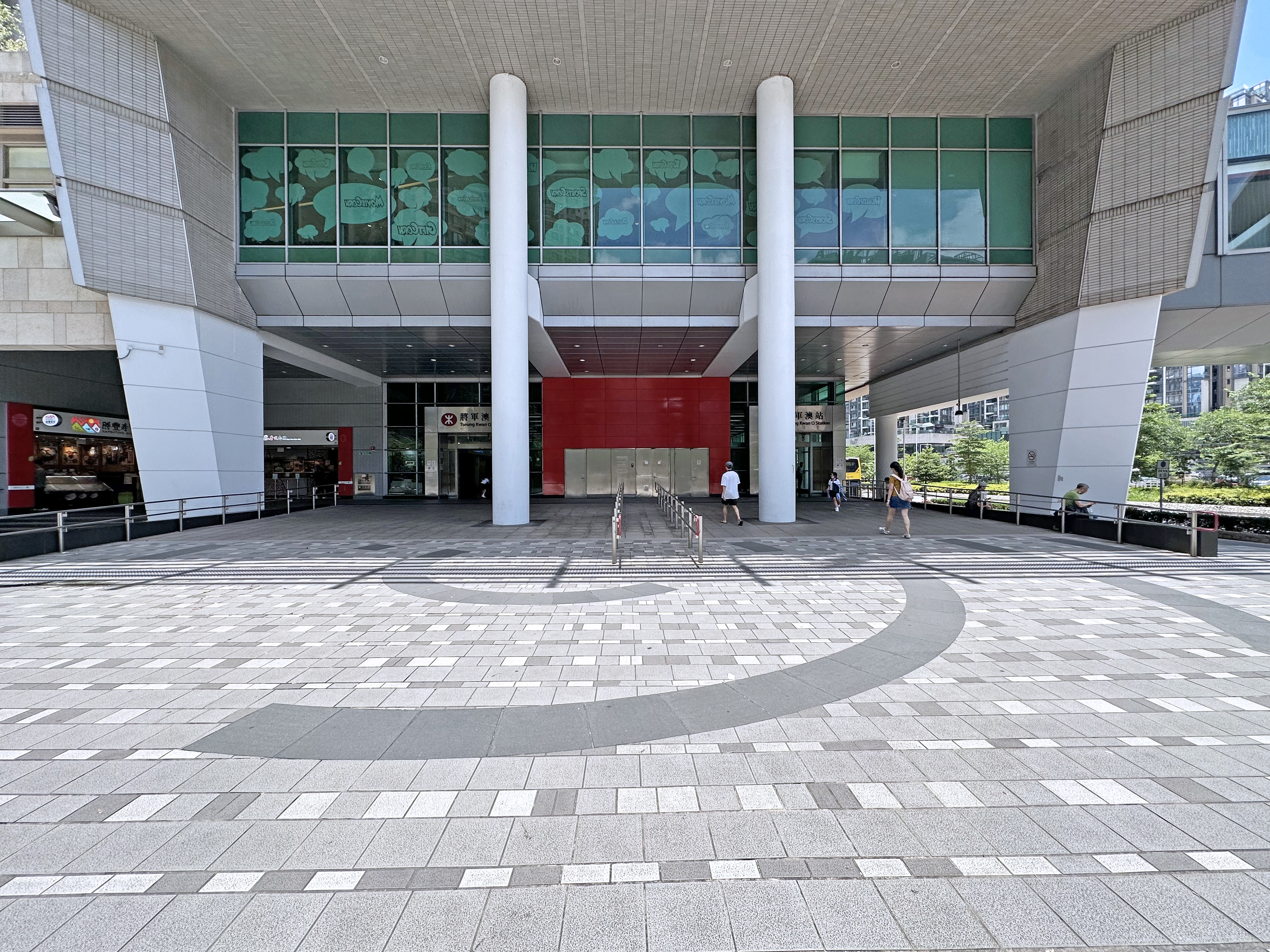
Exits B1 and B2

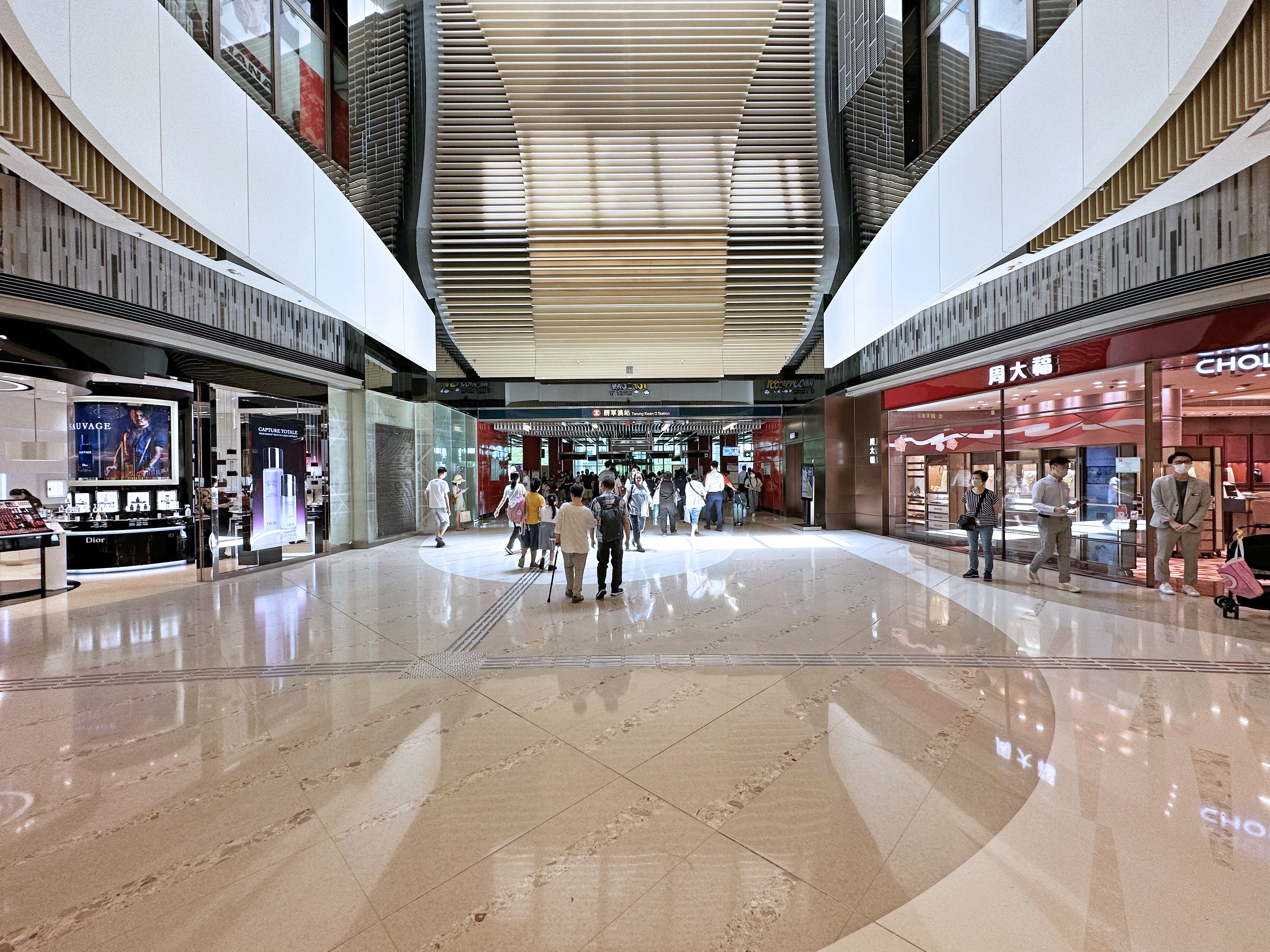
Exit C

== Hotels ==
Sun Hung Kai Properties developed a 359-room Crowne Plaza hotel, a 176-room Vega Suites hotel and a 300-room Holiday Inn Express hotel at Tseung Kwan O station as part of a comprehensive hotel and shopping complex.

== Shopping centre ==
The station is attached to an MTR-owned shopping centre called PopCorn that opened in 2012. It comprises over 40,000 square metres and houses about 150 retailers and a cinema.

PopCorn is an anchor connecting the nearby malls of PopCorn 2, Park Central, and Tseung Kwan O Plaza. A public transport interchange is situated next to PopCorn and serves public light buses routes 103M, 110 and 112S, and Citybus routes 694, 792M, 793, 796S, 796X, 798 and N796.
