= North Island line =

Proposed railway line in Hong Kong

North Island line 北港島綫

Overview
- Owner: MTR Corporation
- Locale: Districts: Central and Western, Wan Chai, Eastern
- Termini: North Point; Hong Kong
- Stations: 4

Service
- System: MTR
- Operator(s): MTR Corporation

History
- Planned opening: 2046+

Technical
- Track gauge: 1,432 mm (4 ft 8 3/8 in)

The North Island line is a shelved proposal to provide rapid transit service for the area between the existing MTR Island line and the northern coast of Hong Kong Island in order to relieve the congested Island line.

Estimates suggest that the proposal may not be completed until 2046.

Originally, according to the document "Rail Projects Under Planning 2000" released by the Highways Department, the current Tung Chung line would be extended from Hong Kong terminus eastward and two new stations, Tamar station and Exhibition Centre station are proposed on the extension. The new route would then connect and continue on the Island line from Fortress Hill station to Chai Wan terminus. The Tseung Kwan O line will have newly constructed tunnels connected from its North Point terminus to Fortress Hill station and continue on the remaining western half of the Island line.

In 2013, the Highways Department released a second option for the North Island line scheme, also known as the "interchange scheme" because it will only extend the Tung Chung line and the Tseung Kwan O line to meet at Tamar station where it will act as an interchange station for the two lines without dividing the Island line. The original scheme is known as the "swap scheme" for distinction.

== 2000 proposal ==
The extension of the Tung Chung line formed part of the third phase of land reclamation in Victoria Harbour on Hong Kong Island's northern coast. Due to environmental and utilization concerns, the MTR Corporation did not set a commencement date. The proposed Sha Tin to Central Link and the merger of MTRC and KCRC also was a consideration. For these reasons, in 2003 the Hong Kong Government postponed the project indefinitely.

However, the MTRC included the Sha Tin to Central Link and the North Island line details in the diagrams of the latest schemes of the West Island line and South Island line, released in 2008. Those diagrams have excluded the now cancelled Central South station and Racecourse Station in Happy Valley.

== 2013 proposal ==
On 21 February 2013, the Highways Department launched stage two of public consultation of Our Future Railway, and proposed two schemes for the North Island line. In addition to a "Swap" scheme which was similar to previous proposals, the consultation documents also included a second "Interchange" scheme.

=== "Swap" scheme ===
The existing Tung Chung line would be extended along the northern coast of Hong Kong Island, with Tamar, Exhibition Centre, Causeway Bay North and Fortress Hill stations along the route. The extension would then connect eastwards to the existing Island line at Fortress Hill station, and continue on the remaining Island line section to Chai Wan station.

Concurrently, the Tseung Kwan O line would extend from its current westbound terminus at North Point station to the existing Island line at Fortress Hill station, and continue on the remaining Island line to Kennedy Town station.

This scheme would greatly increase the number of stations reached directly by the Tung Chung line and the Tseung Kwan O line on Hong Kong Island, but east–west directional traffic along the existing Island line would be interrupted and require an interchange. In addition, the maximum train frequency between Fortress Hill and Chai Wan stations, which would be served by the Tung Chung line, would have to reduce by 8 trains per hour because the service frequency of the Tung Chung line is restricted by the capacity of the Tsing Ma Bridge. The signalling system and rolling stock used on both lines are also different, so the “swap” scheme was not considered in the plan.

Original North Island line route scheme, namely the swap scheme, including the proposed Sha Tin to Central Link, West Island line and South Island line

=== "Interchange" scheme ===
Both the existing Tung Chung line and Tseung Kwan O line would be extended along the northern coast of Hong Kong Island. Three stations, namely Tamar, Exhibition Centre and Causeway Bay North, would be constructed along the extensions, and either Tamar or Causeway Bay North station would be chosen as an interchange between the two lines.

This scheme would preserve the existing Island line in its current form and would not change the current commuting pattern between the Central, Western and Eastern Districts. However, as the Tung Chung and Tseung Kwan O lines would not be run on the Island line, passengers would still need to interchange as they currently do. Also, this arrangement would be less effective than the "Swap" scheme in relieving congestion, since although the number of stations and the area served has increased, the link with the current Island line would still be the same, unlike the "Swap" scheme.

North Island line interchange scheme

== 2014 plan ==
According to the "Railway Development Strategy 2014" document, the government opted for the interchange scheme because its construction cost and difficulties are lower and it does not interfere with the commuting patterns of current Island line users. The cost is estimated to be HK$20 billion in 2013 prices. Planning and construction for the North Island Line was later postponed to 2022 with the opening of East Rail Line to Admiralty; and there is enough capacity for Island Line.

Following the approval of the North Island line in the Railway Development Strategy 2014, implementation faced delays starting in 2016, primarily due to anticipated capacity enhancements from other MTR projects. The Shatin to Central Link, which opened in phases culminating in full service on June 27, 2021, diverted passengers from the East Rail Line, thereby alleviating pressure on the Island Line. Additionally, the East Rail Line extension to Admiralty, operational from May 15, 2022, was expected to increase Island Line patronage but was projected to remain manageable without immediate need for the North Island line. These developments led to the deferral of planning and construction activities through 2022, as the MTR Corporation conducted further assessments to evaluate overall network capacity. In 2022, a government review confirmed the North Island line's indefinite shelving in the short term, though it remained part of long-term railway plans as an extension connecting the Tung Chung Line eastward and the Tseung Kwan O Line westward. The project, spanning approximately 5 km along Hong Kong Island's northern shore, continued to undergo detailed engineering, environmental, and financial studies due to technical challenges, including limited construction areas and proximity to existing infrastructure. No firm construction timeline was established, with alignment revisions, such as those for Tamar and Causeway Bay North stations, still under review in coordination with harbourfront developments.

As of 2025, the North Island line has not advanced to funding allocation or construction commencement, with MTR investment updates focusing on other extensions like the Northern Link and Tung Chung Line Extension. It is retained as a prospective measure to divert harbour-crossing traffic and ease Island Line congestion, but ongoing studies highlight persistent complexities without a scheduled way forward. As of November 2025, there have been no new announcements or progress on the project. In broader policy contexts, such as the Northern Metropolis development strategy, rail priorities have shifted toward New Territories connectivity, indirectly underscoring the North Island line's lower immediacy compared to southern extensions like the South Island Line West, which advanced to preliminary alignment proposals in 2025.
