= LOHAS Park =

Private housing estate in Tseung Kwan O, Hong Kong

Coordinates: 22.295°N 114.271°E

- Chinese: 日出康城
Transcriptions
Standard Mandarin
- Hanyu Pinyin: Rìchū Kāng Chéng
Yue: Cantonese
- Jyutping: jat6 ceot1 hong1 sing4

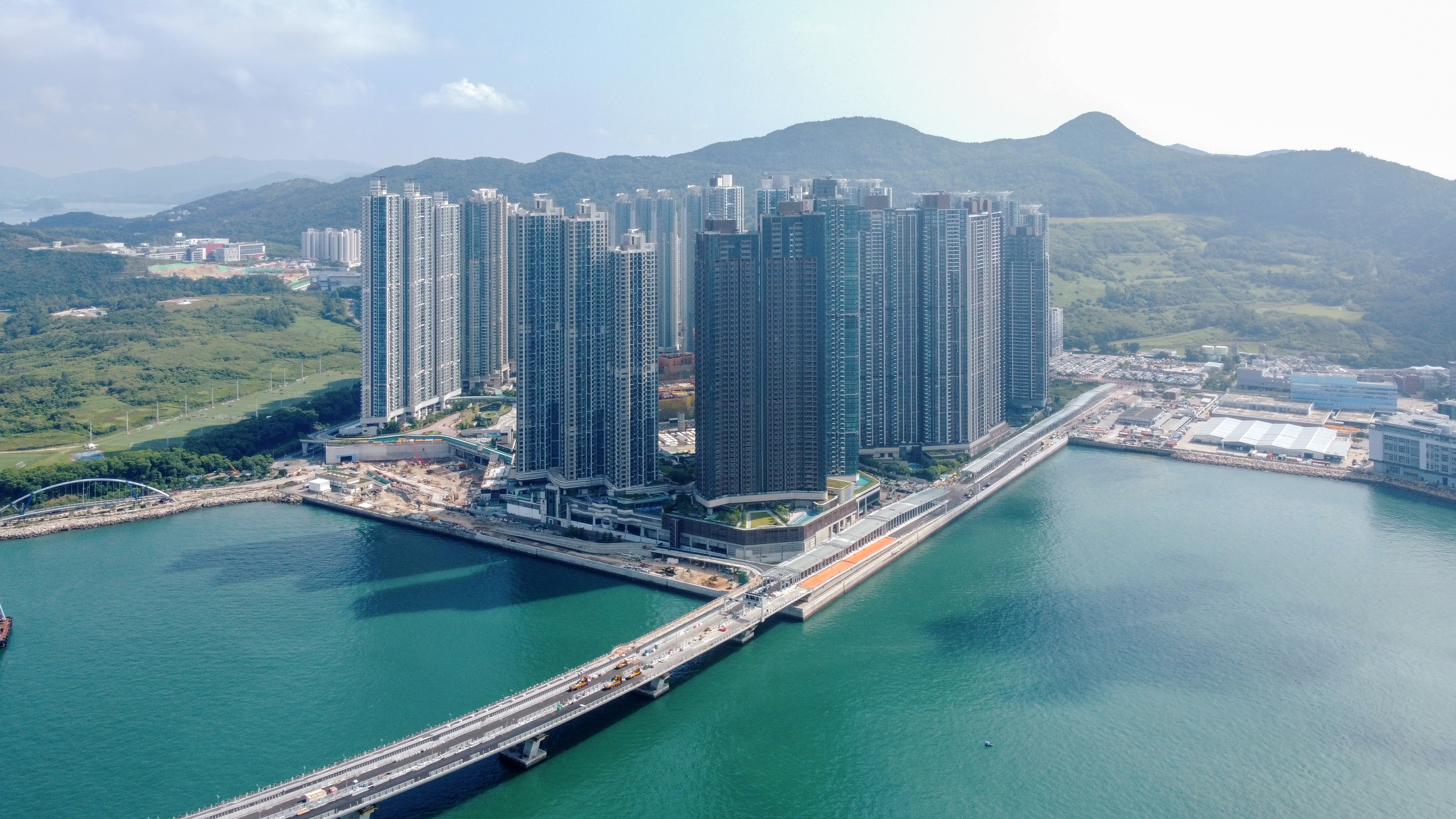
Aerial view of LOHAS Park 2022

LOHAS Park Map

LOHAS Park (Chinese: 日出康城) is a Hong Kong seaside private residential development run by the MTR Corporation. Overlooking Junk Bay, it is located in Tseung Kwan O Area 86, New Territories.

== Name and concept ==
Originally planned under the name "Dream City" in 2002, it was designated as an "environmental protection city". The name was later changed to LOHAS (standing for "lifestyle of health and sustainability") following the 2002–2004 SARS outbreak.

The Chinese name means "sunrise health city". The CLP power substation references the original name, as it is called the "Dream City Power Substation."

Following controversy over "wall effect" buildings in 2007, the developers promised there will be sufficient space to allow wind to circulate the estate.

== The project ==
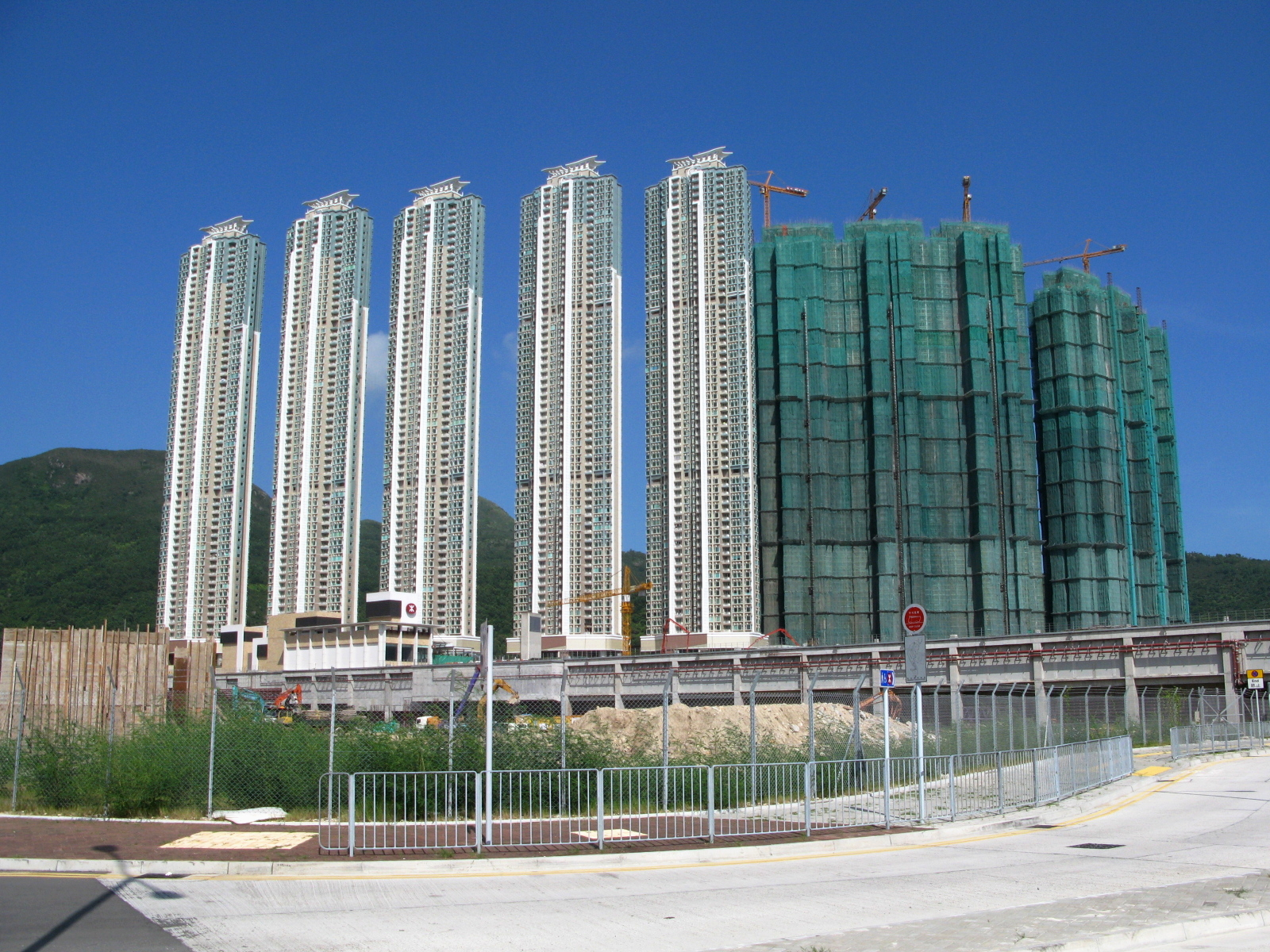
Le Prestige under construction in August 2009

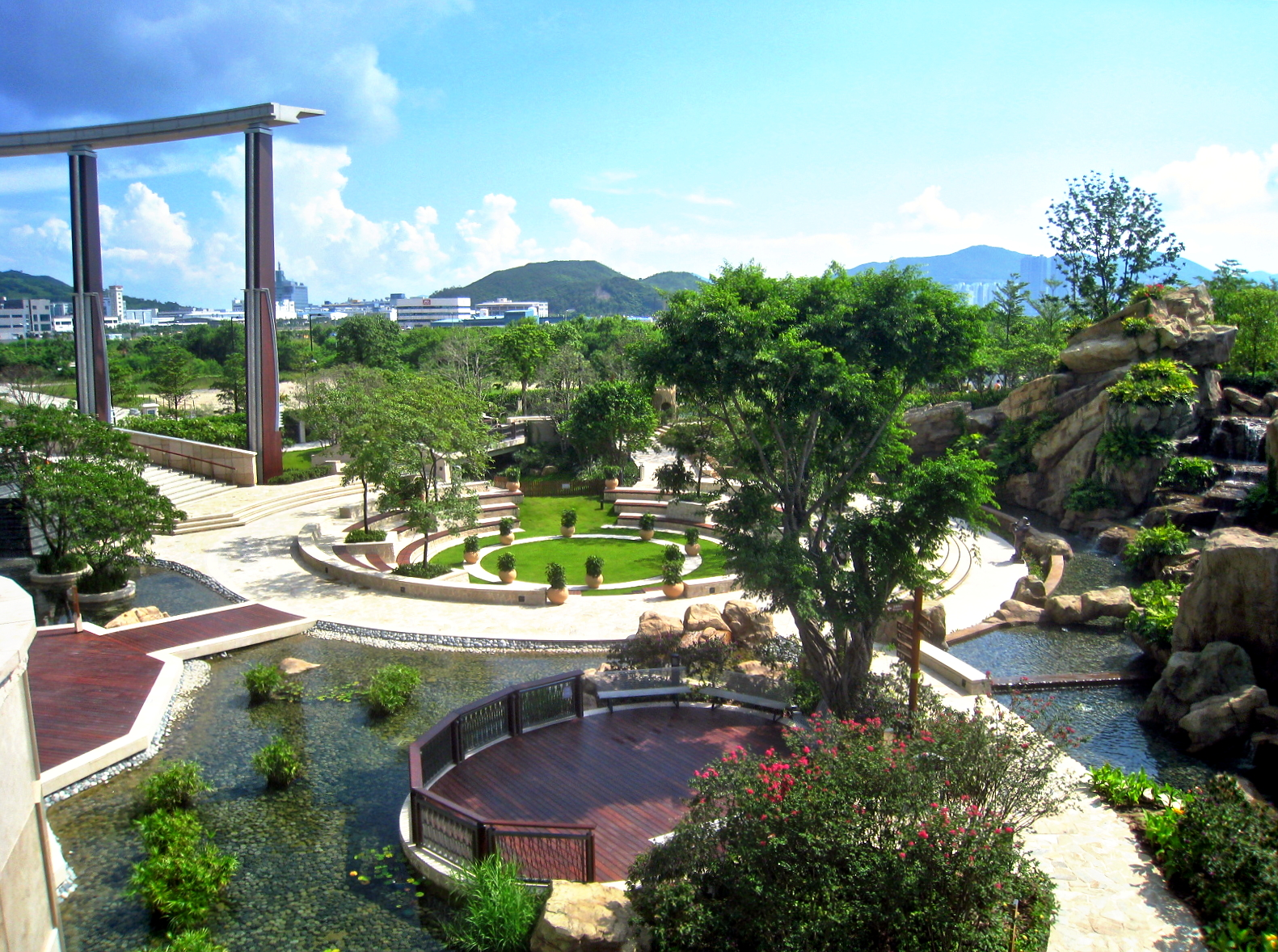
Central Park in LOHAS Park

The 3,550,000 square feet (330,000 m^{2}) estate is divided into 13 phases, composed of 50 high-rise residential towers, offering 21,500 apartments and accommodating roughly 58,000 residents on the site. These will sit above the MTR LOHAS Park station. The gross floor area (GFA) for domestic purposes is up to 1.6 million square metres, and retail GFA will occupy up to 50,000 m^{2}.

Apart from residential development, LOHAS Park will also include 3 shopping malls upon completion, including a 480,000-square-foot MTR mall named THE LOHAS, which opened in 2020.

== Environmental features ==
1.4 million sq ft (40% of the site) of the site is green space: the common area includes a 200,000 sq ft (19,000 m^{2}) park and a 330-metre seafront promenade. Pedestrians can walk to various facilities without having to cross a road since they are linked with covered walkways. The garden is watered by a 440,000-litre water-recycling system.

LOHAS Park, itself on land reclaimed from the sea, is surrounded by land reclaimed from a landfill, as the large piece of greenery immediately to the north was recovered from the (closed in 1995) Tseung Kwan O Stage I landfill. The large mountain slope on the eastern side of LOHAS Park is the old Tseung Kwan O Stage II/III landfill which closed in 1994. According to an MTR spokesman, the landfill can no longer be smelled since the collection of domestic waste was halted in 2014. These landfills should not be confused with the still operational South East New Territories (SENT) Landfill which is about 1 km southeast of LOHAS Park. The SENT is commonly called the Tseung Kwan O landfill in the media. The SENT was expected to become full in the financial year 2014/2015, if the decision to extend its coverage area was not granted.

== Construction ==
'The Capitol' (Chinese: 首都; Cantonese Yale: Sáudōu) belongs to Phase I of the development. It was jointly developed by Cheung Kong Holdings and MTR Corporation in 2008. It comprises 5 high-rise buildings of up to 67 storeys, occupying 1,380,000 square feet (128,000 m^{2}) of floor area and has 2,096 flats.

Phase II of the development was jointly developed by Cheung Kong Holdings and MTR Corporation and Nan Fung Development.

'Le Prestige' (Chinese: 領都; Cantonese Yale: Líhngdōu), Phase IIA (the first of three sub-phases of Phase II of the development) comprises four high-rise buildings up to 70 storeys, with 1,688 flats, completed in 2009.

'Le Prime' (Chinese: 領峰; Cantonese Yale: Líhngfūng), Phase IIB (the second of three sub-phases of Phase II of the development) comprises three high-rise buildings of up to 76 storeys and 1,416 flats, and was completed in 2011.

'La Splendeur' (Chinese: 領凱; Cantonese Yale: Líhnghói), Phase IIC (the third of three sub-phases of Phase II of the development) comprises three high-rise buildings of up to 72 storeys and roughly 1,416 flats and was completed in 2013.

Phase III was jointly developed by Cheung Kong Holdings, the MTR Corporation and Nan Fung Group. It is connected directly to LOHAS Park MTR station.

'Hemera' (Chinese: 緻藍天) belongs to Phase III. It comprises 4 high-rise towers of up to 66 storeys. The towers are named after gemstones: Diamond, Emerald, Amber and Topaz.

Phase IV was jointly developed by Sun Hung Kai Properties and the MTR Corporation.

'Wings at Sea' (Chinese: 晉海) was built as part of Phase IV. It comprises two sub-phases: Phase IVA for the construction of Towers 1 and 2 and Phase IVB (also known as 'Wings at Sea II') for the construction of Towers 3 and 5.

In April 2015, the tender for LOHAS Park Package 4 was awarded to a subsidiary of Sun Hung Kai Properties. In November 2015, the tender for LOHAS Park Package 5 was awarded to a subsidiary of Wheelock & Co.

== The LOHAS ==
The LOHAS 康城

The LOHAS
- Chinese: 康城
Transcriptions
Standard Mandarin
- Hanyu Pinyin: Kāng Chéng
Yue: Cantonese
- Jyutping: hong1 sing4

A shopping mall called The LOHAS is located in LOHAS Park. It opened on 23 August 2020.

== See also ==
- LOHAS Park station
- Tseung Kwan O New Town
- Tseung Kwan O line
