= North Point station =

MTR station on Hong Kong Island

North Point 北角
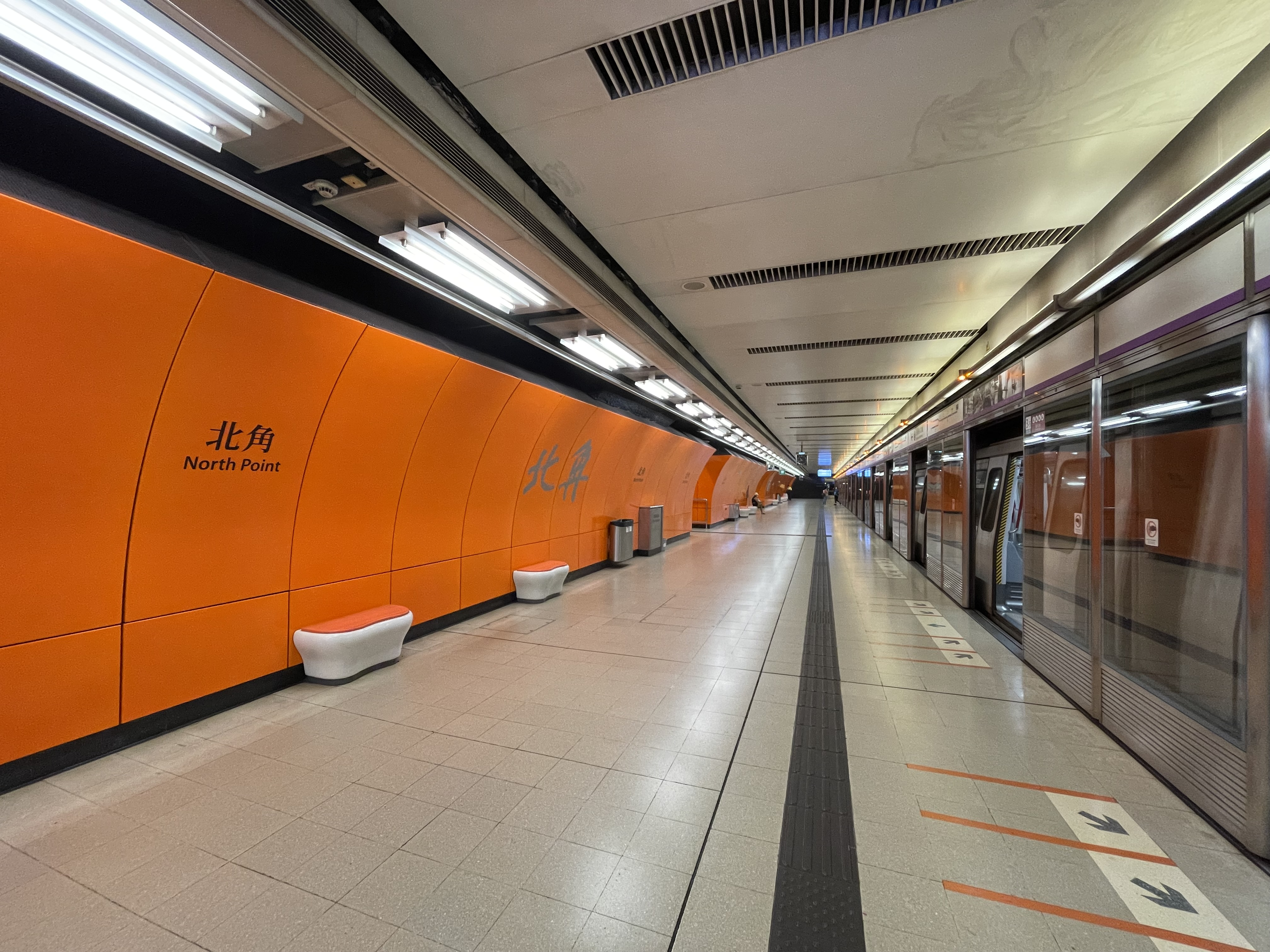
- Platform 3

Chinese name
- Chinese: 北角
- Hanyu Pinyin: Běijiǎo
- Cantonese Yale: Bākgok
- Literal meaning: North Corner
Transcriptions
Standard Mandarin
- Hanyu Pinyin: Běijiǎo
Yue: Cantonese
- Yale Romanization: Bākgok
- Jyutping: Bak1gok3
Southern Min
- Hokkien POJ: Pak-kak

General information
- Location: Near Roca Centre, King's Road, North Point; Eastern District, Hong Kong
- Coordinates: 22°17′27″N 114°12′03″E
- System: MTR rapid transit station
- Operator: MTR Corporation
- Lines: Island line; Tseung Kwan O line
- Platforms: 4 (2 island platforms)
- Tracks: 4
- Connections: Tram; North Point Ferry Pier; Bus, minibus

Construction
- Structure type: Underground
- Platform levels: 2
- Accessible: Yes

Other information
- Station code: NOP

History
- Opened: Island line : 31 May 1985; 41 years ago; Kwun Tong line : 27 September 2001; 25 years ago

Services
Preceding station	MTR	Following station
Fortress Hill towards Kennedy Town	Island line	Quarry Bay towards Chai Wan
Terminus	Tseung Kwan O line	Quarry Bay towards Po Lam or LOHAS Park
Proposed (North Island line extension)
Causeway Bay North towards Tamar	Tseung Kwan O line (North Island line)	Quarry Bay towards Po Lam or LOHAS Park

Former services
Preceding station	MTR	Following station
Quarry Bay towards Yau Ma Tei	Kwun Tong line (2001-2002)	Terminus
Track layout
Location
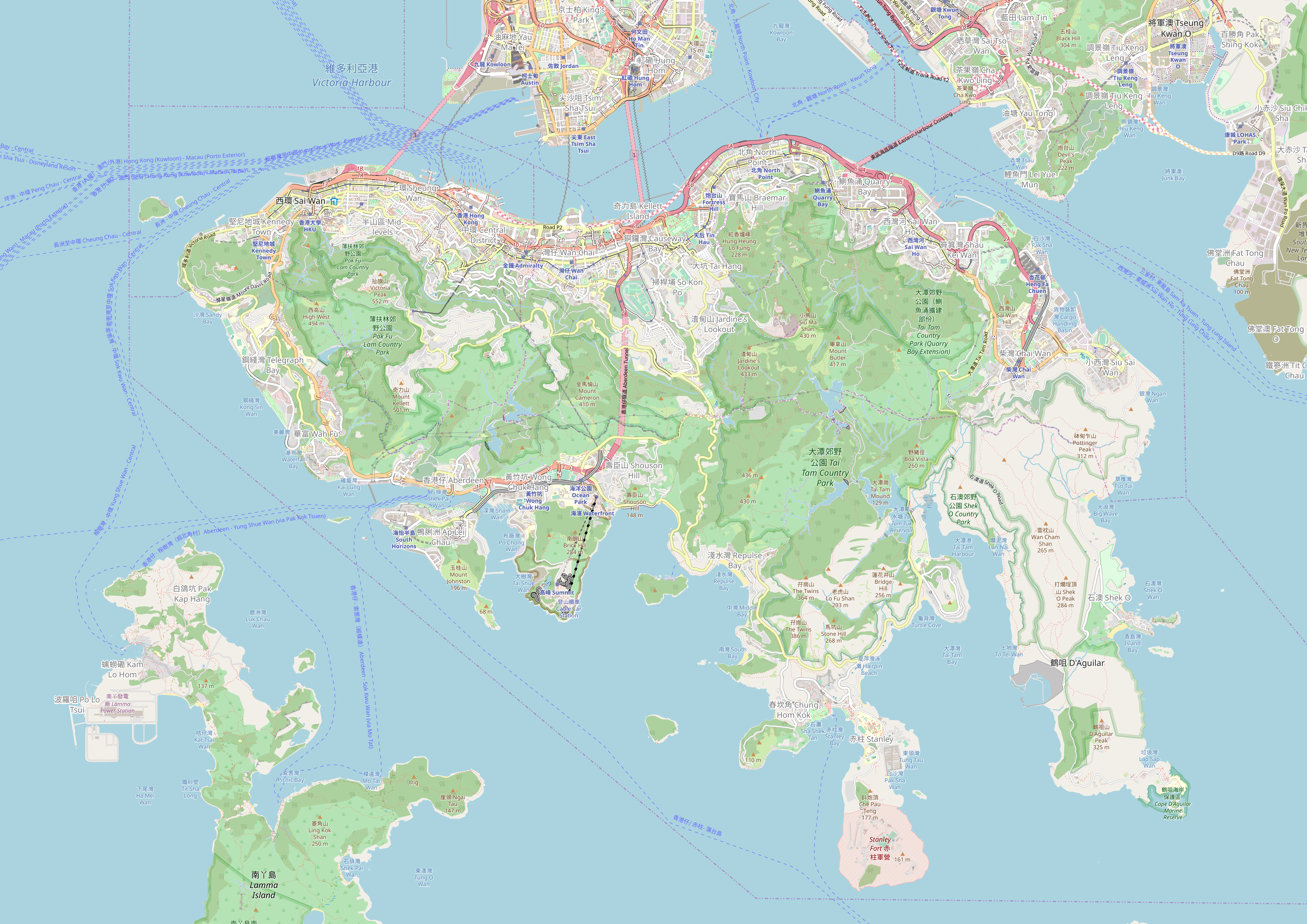
- Location within MTR Location within Hong Kong Island Location within Hong Kong urban core

North Point (Chinese: 北角; Cantonese Yale: Bākgok) is a station on the Hong Kong MTR Island line and the western terminus of the Tseung Kwan O line, located in North Point on Hong Kong Island. The livery of the station is tomato orange. The interchange between the Island line and the Tseung Kwan O line is a cross-platform interchange. North Point is the northernmost station on the Island line.

== History ==
=== Island line ===
The contactors for the station are Leighton Contractors (Asia) for the station's concourse and Paul Y. for the tunnels and platforms.

This station was opened on 31 May 1985 upon the completion of the Island line. Until 2001, the station was only used by that line, and the layout of the station at that time featured a stacked side platform arrangement with trains running towards Sheung Wan station operating on the level above trains running towards Chai Wan station.

=== Tsueng Kwan O line ===
Between 2001 and 2002, this station was expanded to facilitate a cross-platform interchange with the Kwun Tong line. The contractor for the station expansion was awarded to Nishimatsu Construction, and works started in July 1998.

A new platform was constructed on each level opposite the existing platform and the station served as the temporary terminus of Kwun Tong line. On 4 August 2002, the section of Tseung Kwan O line from this station to Yau Tong was opened to allow passengers to develop familiarity with the new cross-harbour interchange arrangement. Since 18 August 2002, this station serves as an interchange station between the two lines as well as the terminus of Tseung Kwan O line.

In 2001, an artwork by architect Tao Ho and local schoolchildren called North Point, My Neighbourhood was installed in the station. It is an illustrated mural depicting familiar sights from around North Point.

== Station layout ==
G	-	Exits
-	Walkway	MTRshops; Walkway to all exits
L1	Concourse	Customer Service, MTRshops; Vending machines, Automatic teller machines Octopus Promotion Machine
L2; Upper Platforms	Platform 2	← Island line towards Kennedy Town (Fortress Hill)
L2; Upper Platforms	Island platform, doors will open on the left for Island line, right for Tseung Kwan O line
L2; Upper Platforms	Platform 4	← Tseung Kwan O line termination platform
L3; Lower Platforms	Platform 1	Island line towards Chai Wan (Quarry Bay) →
L3; Lower Platforms	Island platform, doors will open on the right for Island line, left for Tseung Kwan O line
L3; Lower Platforms	Platform 3	Tseung Kwan O line towards Po Lam or LOHAS Park (Quarry Bay) →

Compared to cross-platform arrangements at other MTR stations, the transfer distance is longer here; however, it is nevertheless much more convenient for commuters to transfer than passing through the corridors in Quarry Bay station, which provides no cross-platform arrangement.

== Entrances/exits ==
All exits are located on King's Road and the side streets nearby.

- A1: Java Road
- A2: Marble Road
- A3: Odeon Plaza
- A4: Shu Kuk Street
- B1/B2/B3: King's Road
- B4: Tsat Tsz Mui Road

== Transport connections ==
North Point is the home of a large bus terminus, situated at the North Point Ferry Pier. (Exit A1) At the same time, other modes of transport like buses, trams and taxis are accessed at King's Road, which can be reached through Exits B1 and B3.

=== Ferry ===
The North Point Ferry Pier (entrance/exit A1) provides services to Hung Hom, Kowloon City and Kwun Tong. Passengers who wish to take the ferry should leave North Point station at entrance/exit A1, and follow Shu Kuk Street until they reach the seashore.

== Special train ==
To relieve overcrowding of the Kennedy Town-bound platform in morning peak hours, a number of trains from Chai Wan Depot run empty and are placed into service at North Point.

== Future development ==
North Point will become an intermediate station on the Tseung Kwan O line once the North Island line project is completed. Tseung Kwan O line North Point-bound train will run towards Tamar via Fortress Hill, Causeway Bay North and Exhibition Centre stations, paralleling the Island line. This will significantly relieve the overcrowding on Kennedy Town-bound trains of the Island line during the morning rush hour.

== Gallery ==
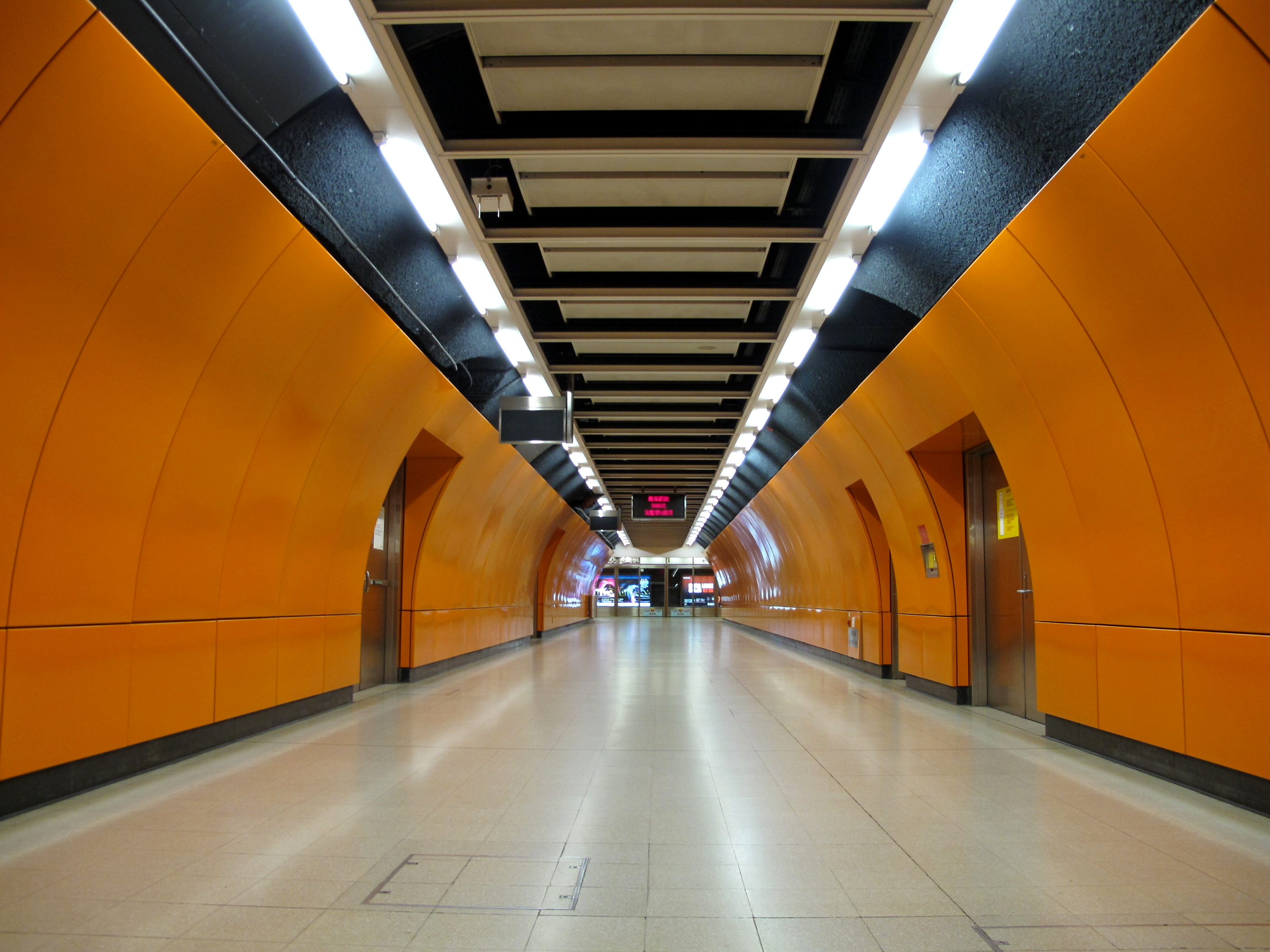
Long passageway between two platforms

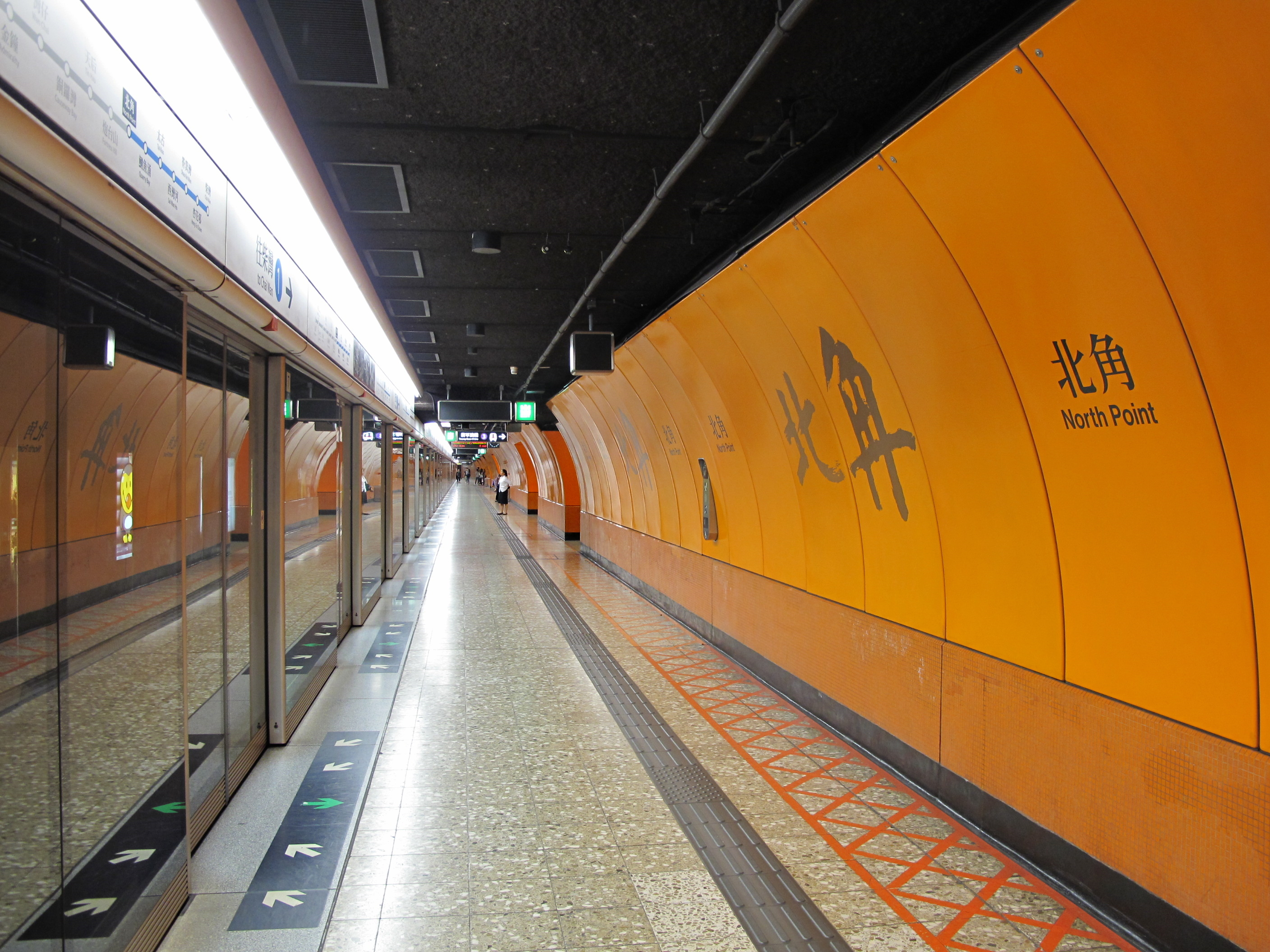
Platform 1 (Towards Chai Wan)

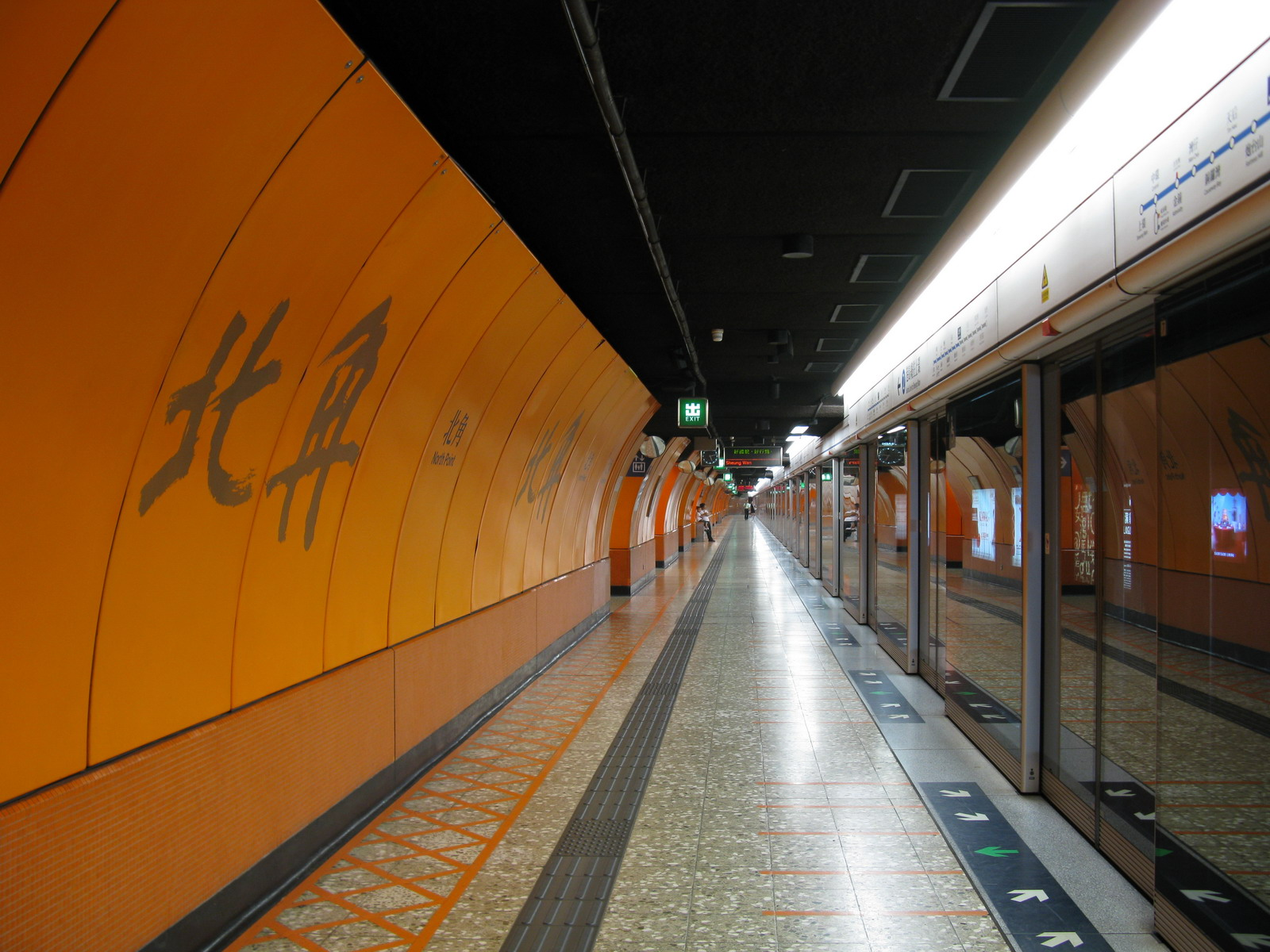
Platform 2 (Towards Kennedy Town)

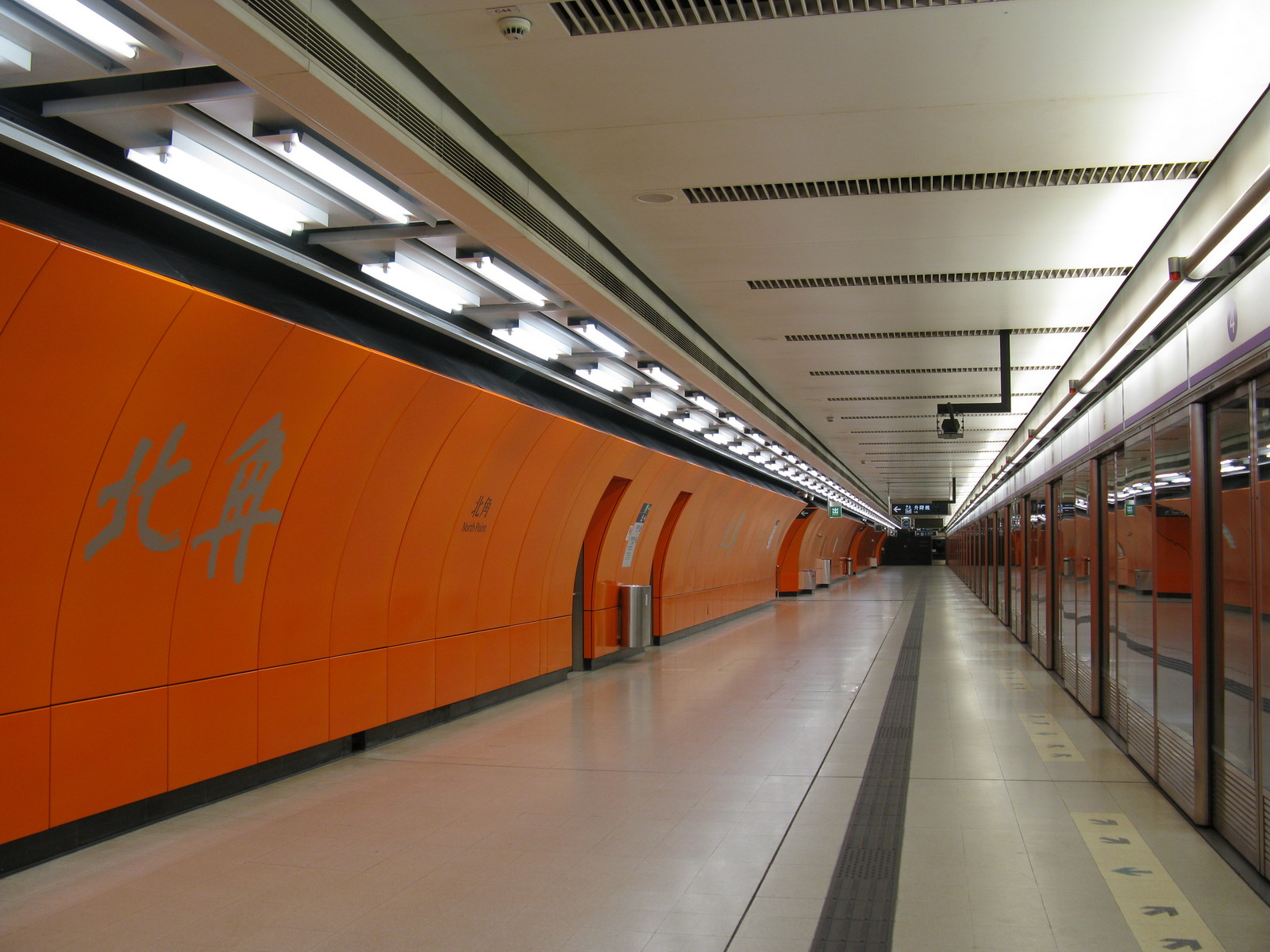
Platform 4 (termination platform)

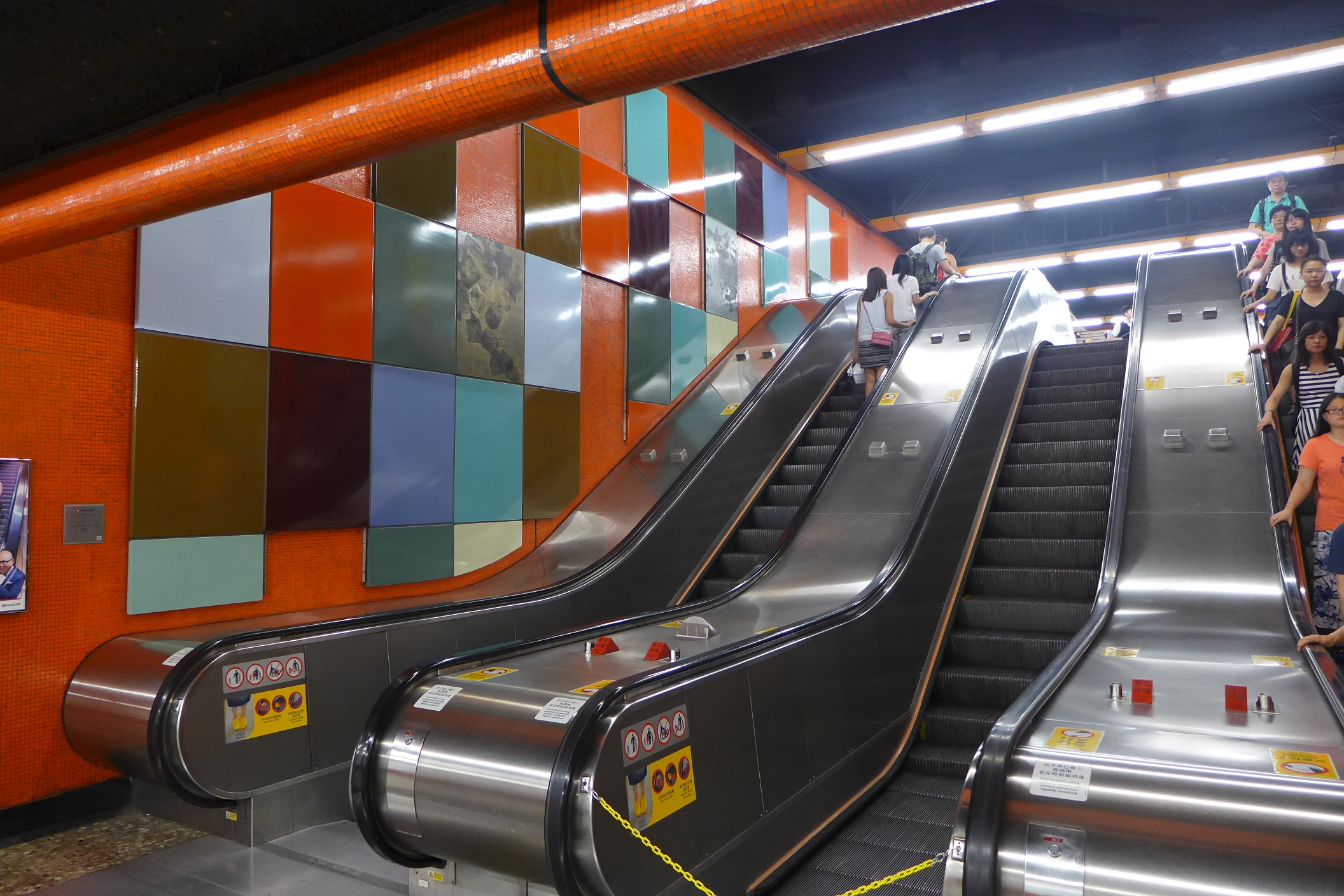
Art wall

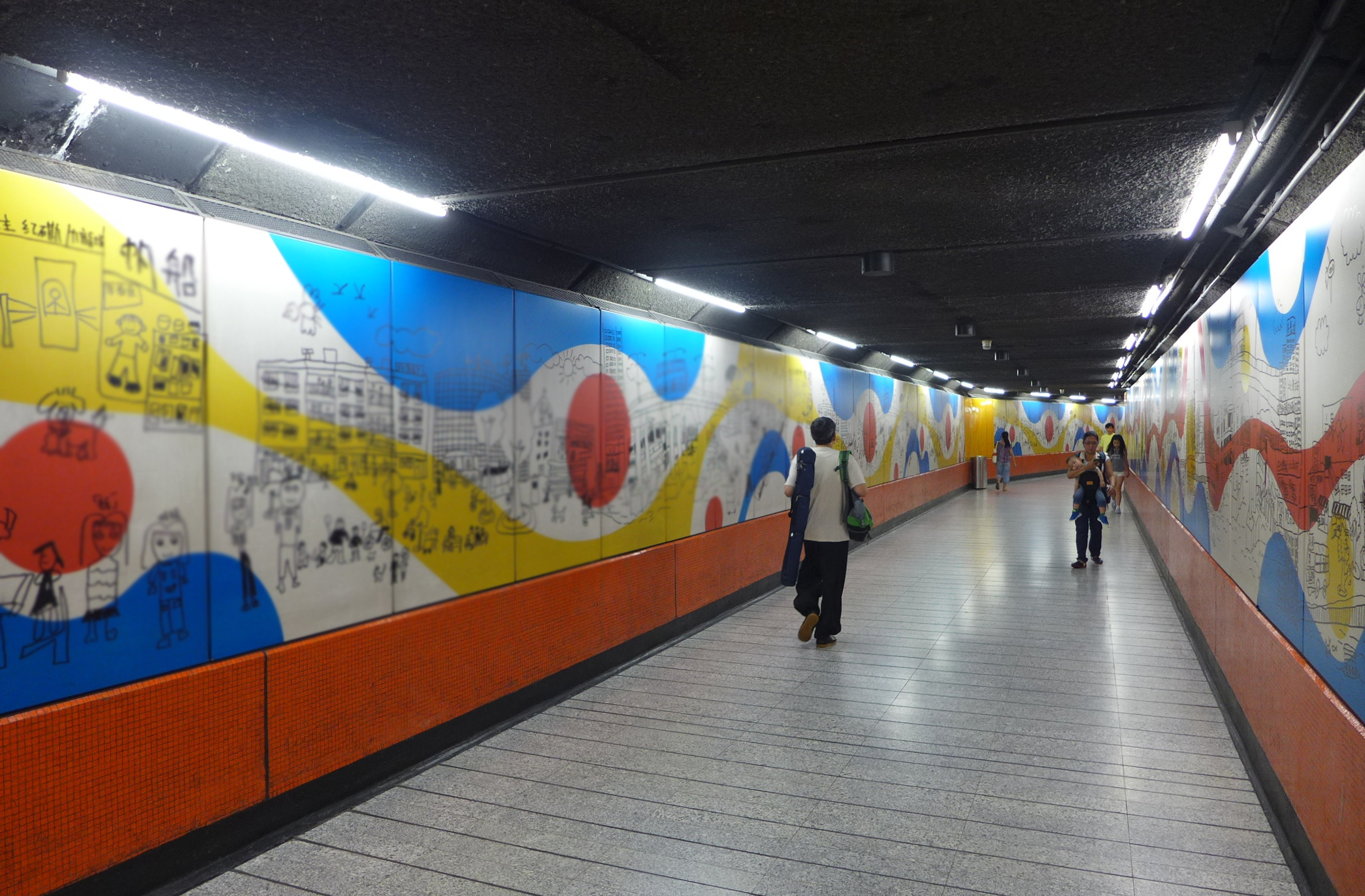
Exit A art

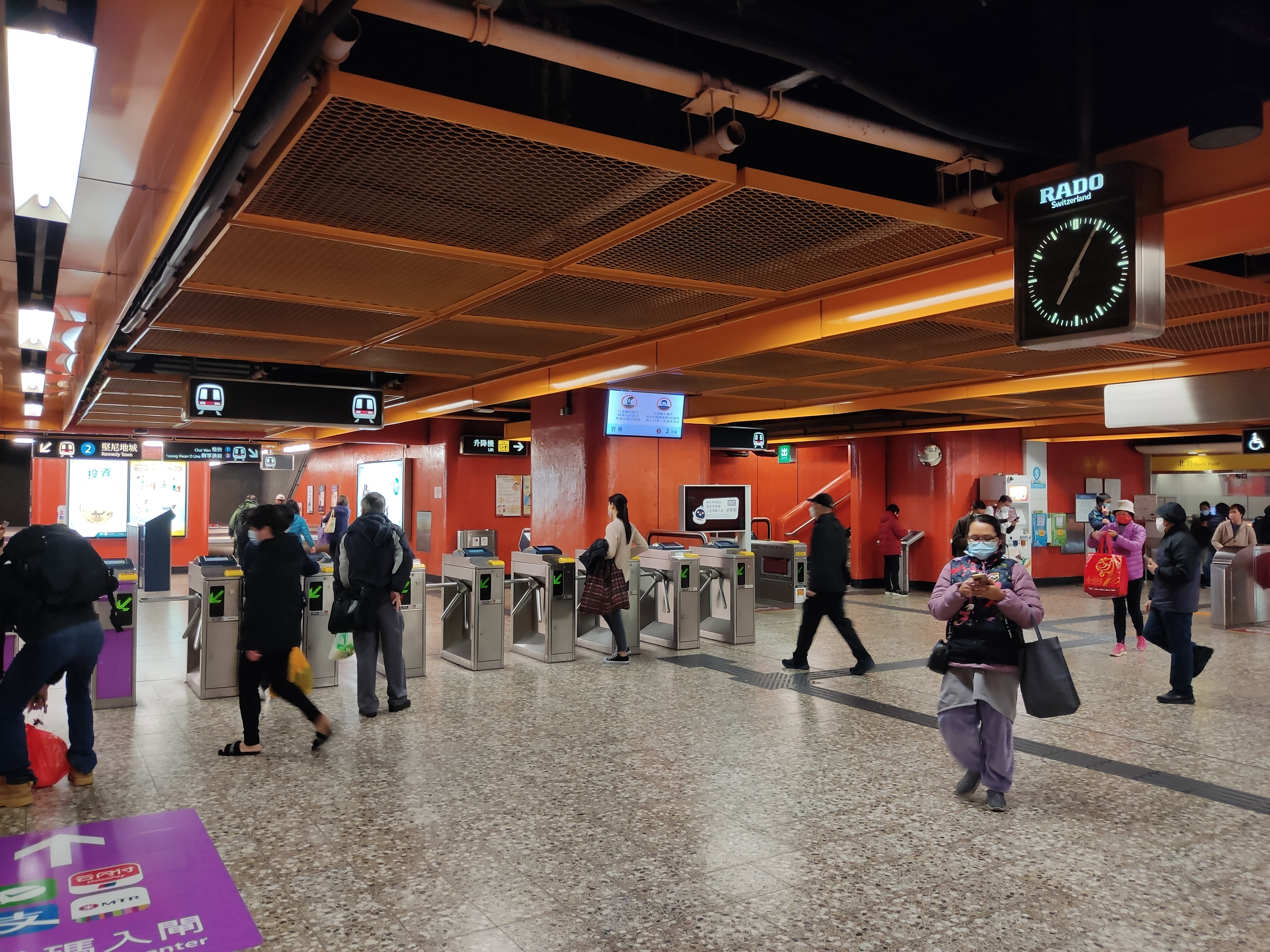
Concourse

== See also ==
- North Island line
