= Fortress Hill station =

MTR station on Hong Kong Island

Fortress Hill 炮台山
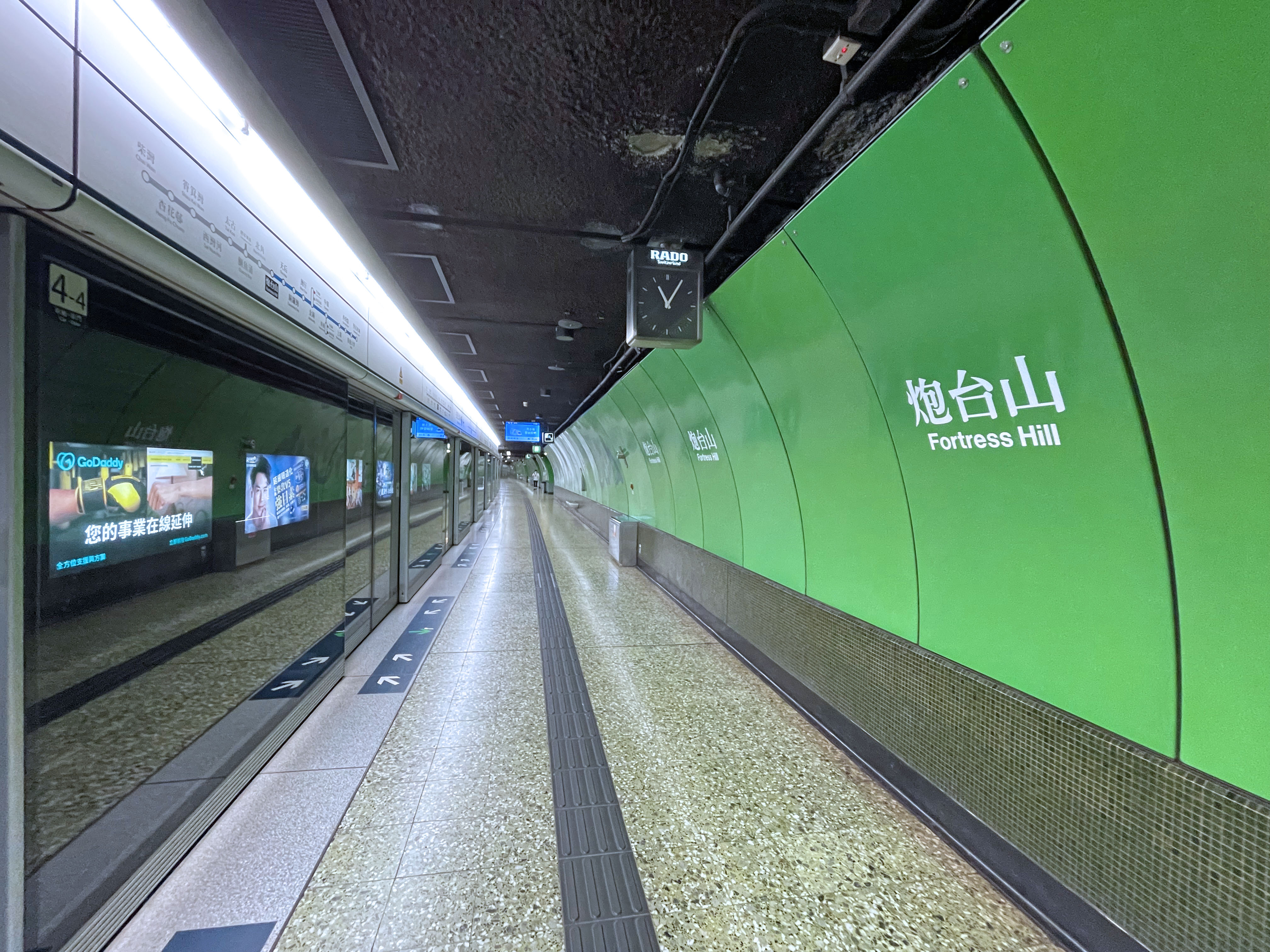
- Platform 2 of Fortress Hill station

Chinese name
- Chinese: 炮台山
- Hanyu Pinyin: Pàotáishān
- Cantonese Yale: Paautòisāan
- Literal meaning: Battery Hill
Transcriptions
Standard Mandarin
- Hanyu Pinyin: Pàotáishān
Yue: Cantonese
- Yale Romanization: Paautòisāan
- Jyutping: Paau3toi4saan1

General information
- Location: Fortress Metro Tower, King's Road, Fortress Hill; Eastern District, Hong Kong
- Coordinates: 22°17′17″N 114°11′37″E
- System: MTR rapid transit station
- Operator: MTR Corporation
- Line: Island line
- Platforms: 2 (1 island platform)
- Tracks: 2
- Connections: Tram; Bus, minibus

Construction
- Structure type: Underground
- Platform levels: 1
- Accessible: Yes (with staff assistance from street to concourse)

Other information
- Station code: FOH

History
- Opened: 31 May 1985; 41 years ago
- Former names: Causeway Bay East

Services
Preceding station	MTR	Following station
Tin Hau towards Kennedy Town	Island line	North Point towards Chai Wan
Track layout
Location
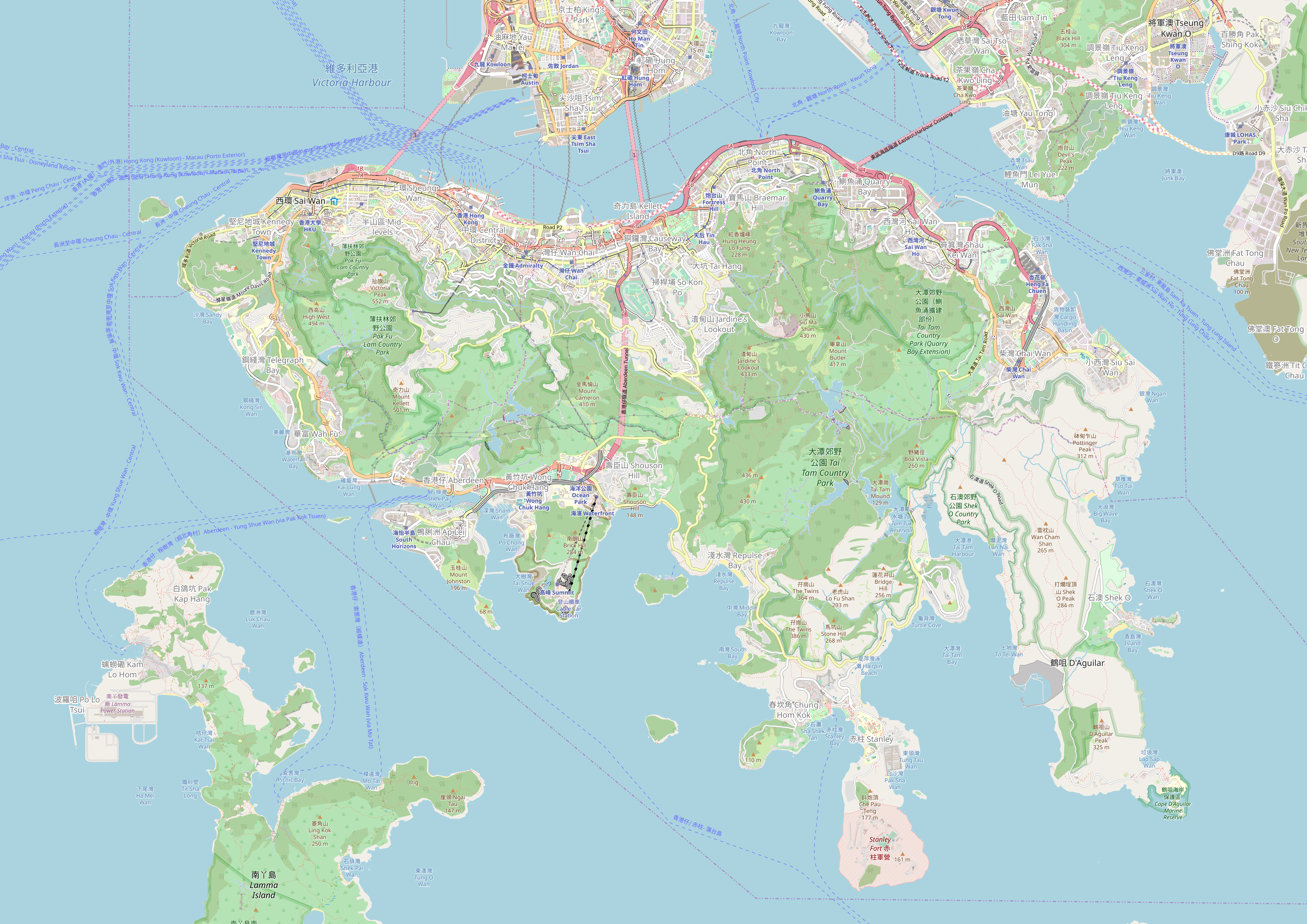
- Location within MTR Location within Hong Kong urban core Location within Hong Kong Island

Fortress Hill (Chinese: 炮台山; Cantonese Yale: paau tòi sāan, lit. Barbette Hill) is a station on the Island line of the Hong Kong MTR system. The station is located in the Fortress Hill section of Hong Kong on the eponymous island. Like all MTR stations, Fortress Hill has a unique colour scheme; its livery is dark green. The distance between this station and Tin Hau to the west is approximately 480 metres, the second-closest stations after Mong Kok and Prince Edward.

== History ==
On 31 May 1985, Fortress Hill station opened with the first phase of the Island line. The station was built by Paul Y. Construction (now Paul Y. Engineering).

== Station layout ==
Fortress Hill is laid out in a manner similar to many other MTR stations. Passengers enter on the ground level and take escalators down to the concourse. From the concourse level they take another escalator ride down to the platform.

Platforms 1 and 2 are arranged in an island platform layout. In a similar manner to the deep-level London Underground stations, each track and platform is in a separate tube shaft with a common entrance and exit point between the two tubes. Each platform is equipped with platform screen doors for safety and ventilation reasons. As with most of the Island Line platforms, the platform walls are curved.

There are only four escalators that connect the concourse and the platforms; they are some of the longest in the MTR system.

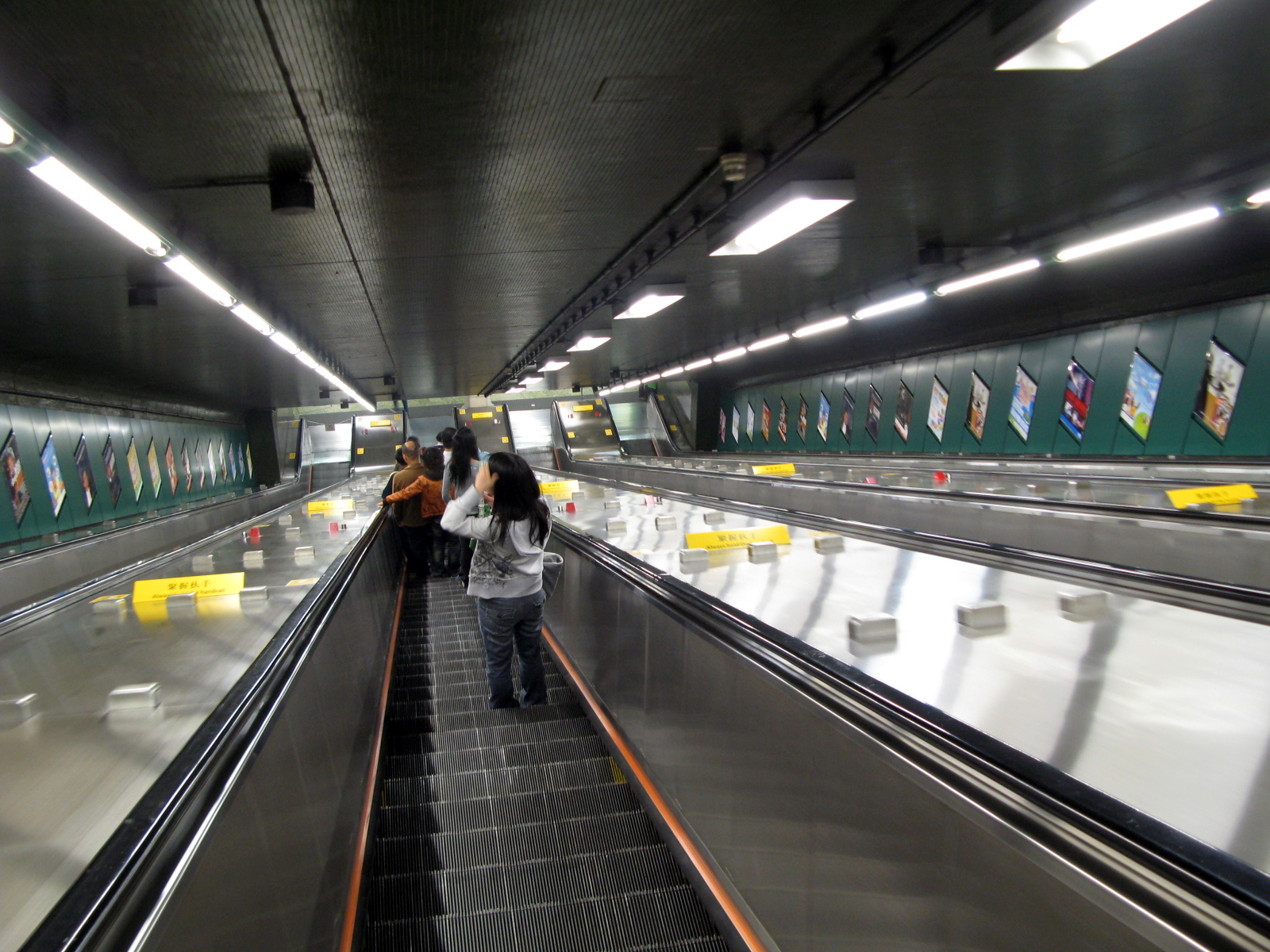
The longest escalators in the MTR system

G	Ground level	Exits
L1	Concourse	Customer service, MTR shops
L1	Concourse	ATM
L3; Platform	Platform 1	Island line towards Chai Wan (North Point) →
L3; Platform	Island platform, doors will open on the right
L3; Platform	Entrance/exit vestibule
L3; Platform	Island platform, doors will open on the right
L3; Platform	Platform 2	← Island line towards Kennedy Town (Tin Hau)

== Entrances and exits ==
There are two exits at Fortress Hill station. Both are located on the same side of King's Road (英皇道) but on opposite ends of the Fortress Metro Tower, a high-rise residential complex.

- A: for the AIA Tower and Citicorp Centre
- B: for the Olympia Plaza and Electric Centre
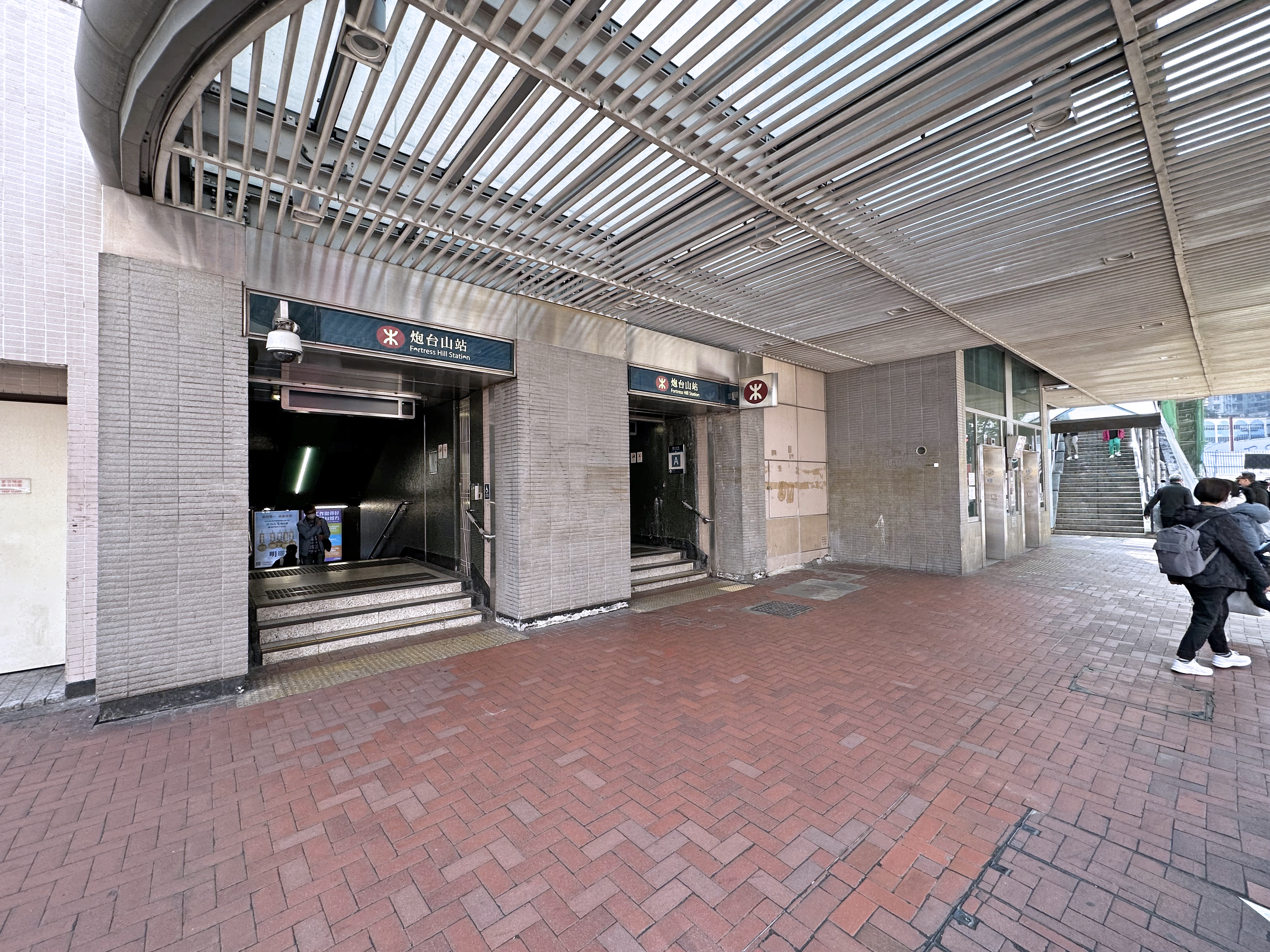
Exit A

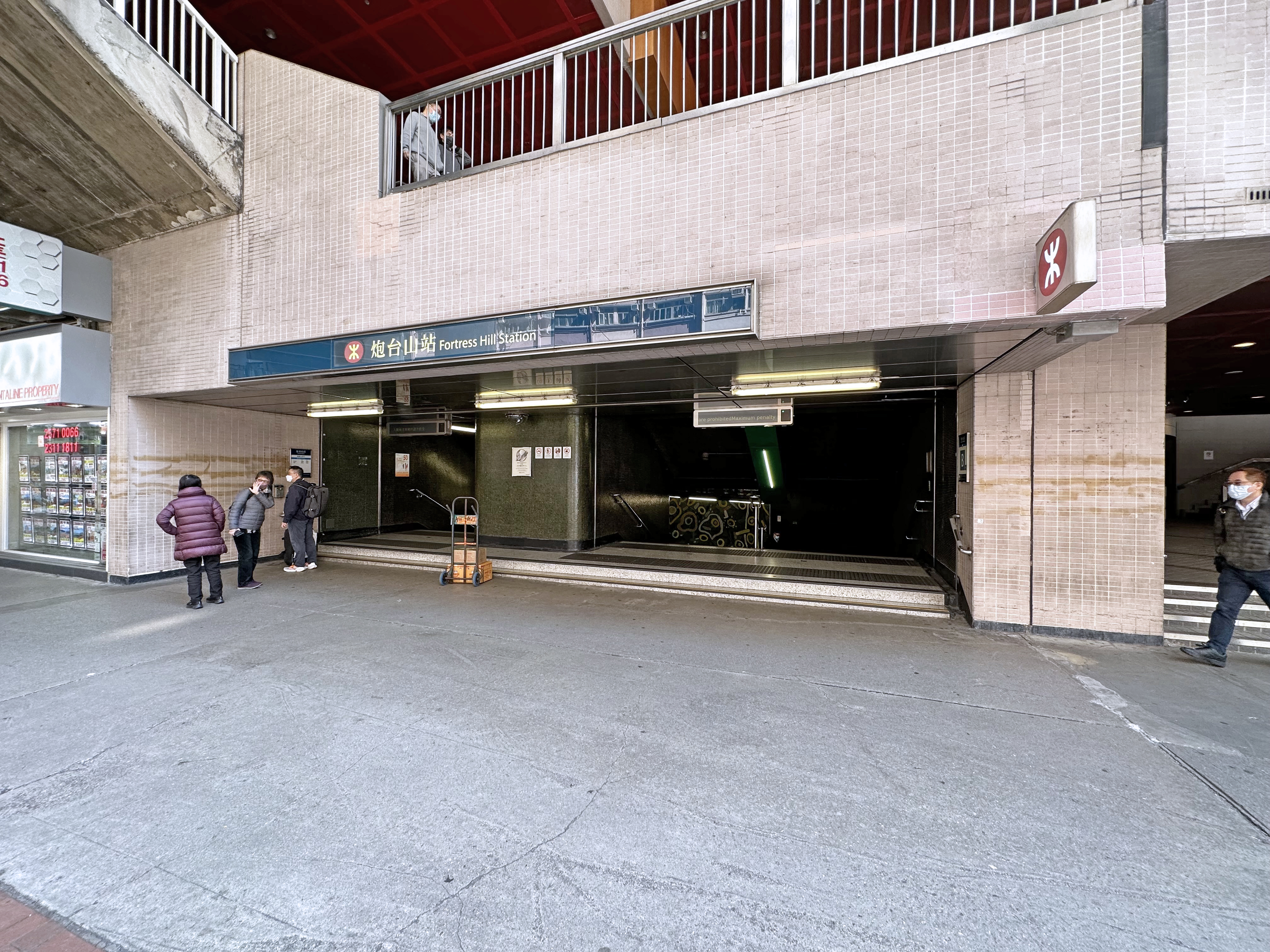
Exit B
