= Olympia Plaza =

- Location: North Sumatra, Indonesia
- Coordinates: 3.5879695°N 98.6875084°E
- Address: Jl. Letjen. M.T. Haryono, No. 99, Pusat Pasar, Medan Kota, Medan City
- Opened: June 22, 1984; 42 years ago
- Owner: PT Olympia Plaza Medan
- Floors: 9
- Public transit: Taxi, Angkot, Ojek, Becak, DAMRI

Olympia Plaza is one of the shopping malls located in the city of Medan, North Sumatra. Olympia Plaza is the oldest mall still standing in Medan. This mall was inaugurated on 22 June 1984 by the Mayor of Medan, Agus Salim Rangkuti. Olympia Plaza is located near Pusat Pasar, commonly called Pajak Sentral, and is also adjacent to Medan Mall.

== History ==
During its heyday, around the mid-1980s, the facilities available at Olympia were considered complete. Floors 1, 2 and 3 were used as places for selling fabrics and clothing, Floor 4 was occupied by a supermarket selling various household supplies, Floor 5 was used as an arcade game park, Floor 6 was occupied by a movie theater and food court, Floors 7 and 8 were used for night entertainment venues, and Floor 9 was used as a warehouse and the head office of the mall management.

Medan Mall was built right next to it in 1995. Medan Mall, which offered a more modern and comfortable concept, became an attraction of its own for visitors. Entering the late 1990s, Olympia Plaza began to be abandoned by sellers and visitors as a result of losing the competition, and the building had experienced several fires. At present, the Olympia Plaza building only functions on Floors 1, 2 and 3, where clothing wholesale shops are located.
