= LOHAS Park station =

MTR station in the New Territories, Hong Kong

LOHAS Park 康城
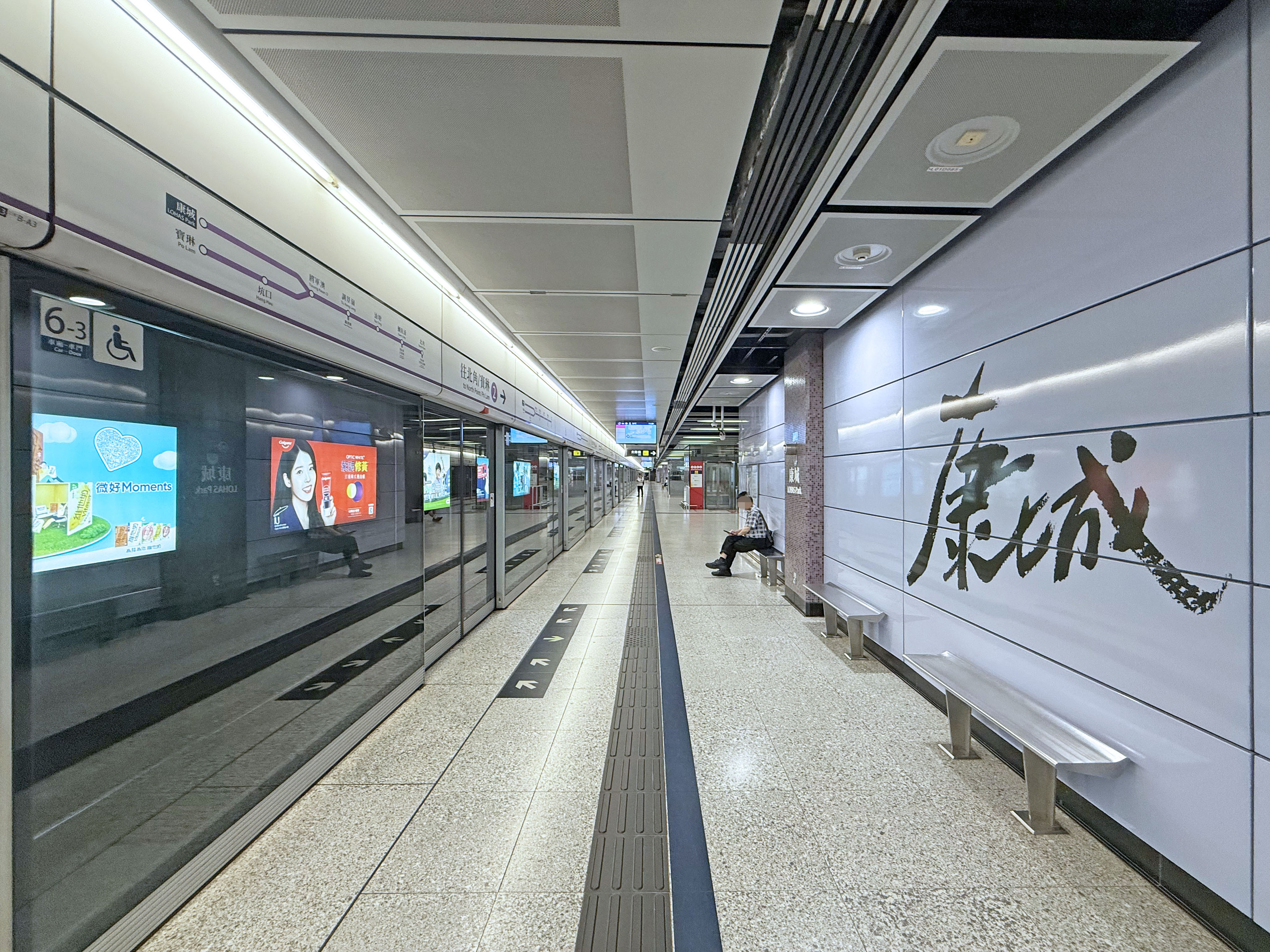
- LOHAS Park station

Chinese name
- Traditional Chinese: 康城
- Cantonese Yale: Hōngsìhng
- Literal meaning: Health City
Transcriptions
Standard Mandarin
- Hanyu Pinyin: Kāngchéng
Yue: Cantonese
- Yale Romanization: Hōngsìhng
- IPA: [hɔ́ːŋ.sɪ̏ŋ]
- Jyutping: Hong1sing4

General information
- Location: 1 LOHAS Park Road, LOHAS Park, Tseung Kwan O Sai Kung District, Hong Kong
- Coordinates: 22°17′45″N 114°16′08″E
- System: MTR rapid transit station
- Owner: MTR Corporation
- Operator: MTR Corporation
- Line: Tseung Kwan O line
- Platforms: 2 (1 island platform)
- Tracks: 2
- Connections: Bus, minibus

Construction
- Structure type: At-grade
- Platform levels: 1
- Accessible: Yes

Other information
- Station code: LHP

History
- Opened: 26 July 2009; 17 years ago
- Electrified: 1,500 V DC (Overhead line)

Services
| Preceding station | MTR | Following station |
|---|---|---|
| Tseung Kwan O towards North Point | Tseung Kwan O line | Terminus |
Track layout
Location
- Location within MTR

LOHAS Park (Chinese: 康城; Cantonese Yale: Hōngsìhng) is a Mass Transit Railway station on the Tseung Kwan O line of the MTR system in Hong Kong. It opened on 26 July 2009 and its livery is lavender.

== Location ==
The station serves a residential project called LOHAS Park (formerly "Dream City") at Area 86. The first tenders for the construction of Phase 1 were completed in January 2005. Next to the Tseung Kwan O line Depot, it is the easternmost railway station in Hong Kong.

=== Transit-oriented development ===
In accordance with both MTR's "Rail + Property" funding scheme and one of the goals of the Tseung Kwan O line being to connect large housing estates on the eastern side of Victoria Harbour to Hong Kong Island, LOHAS Park is a site for transit-oriented development. LOHAS Park will be the largest MTR property development, a 32.08 ha (79.27 acres) site with 50 towers containing 21,500 apartments and approximately 45,000 m^{2} (480,000 sq ft) of retail.

== History ==
During the construction stages, the station was temporarily named Tseung Kwan O South, after its location in the southern part of the Tseung Kwan O New Town.

Since the station opened on 26 July 2009, the Tseung Kwan O line has been split into two branches at Tseung Kwan O, with the original northern branch towards Po Lam, and the new southern branch towards LOHAS Park. This is the second branch in the MTR system, after Lok Ma Chau station on the East Rail line.

=== Service controversy ===
To operate the branch, MTR instituted a "3+1" service whereby every fourth train runs to LOHAS Park. After 8 December 2014, MTR instituted a "2+1" service in peak hours. During off peak and Sundays, a shuttle train between LOHAS Park and Tiu Keng Leng would operate. This is one example when the "terminus" of some trains are within intermediate stations.

Although MTR compensated for the slight reduction of service by decreasing headways by ten seconds to 2.5 minutes, residents and passengers have complained that the branched nature of the line has increased delays. MTR says that its on-time rate is still 99.9%.

== Station layout ==
| U3; Podium | Podium | Exit C, Passageway to LOHAS Park |
| U2 | Concourse | Customer service centre, MTRShops, Exit B, Public Transport Interchange |
| U1; Platform | Platform 1 | ← Tseung Kwan O line towards North Point (Tseung Kwan O) |
| U1; Platform | Island platform, doors will open on the left/right |
| U1; Platform | Platform 2 | ← Tseung Kwan O line towards North Point (Tseung Kwan O) |

There are two platform faces on an island platform. Like in other underground MTR stations, platform screen doors have been installed.

=== Entrances and exits ===
==== Podium (U3) ====
- C: LOHAS Park
  - C1: LOHAS Park, LOHAS Youth S.P.O.T., The Capitol, Le Prestige, Le Prime, La Splendeur
  - C2: LOHAS Park

==== Concourse (U2) ====
- B: The LOHAS, Public Transport Interchange
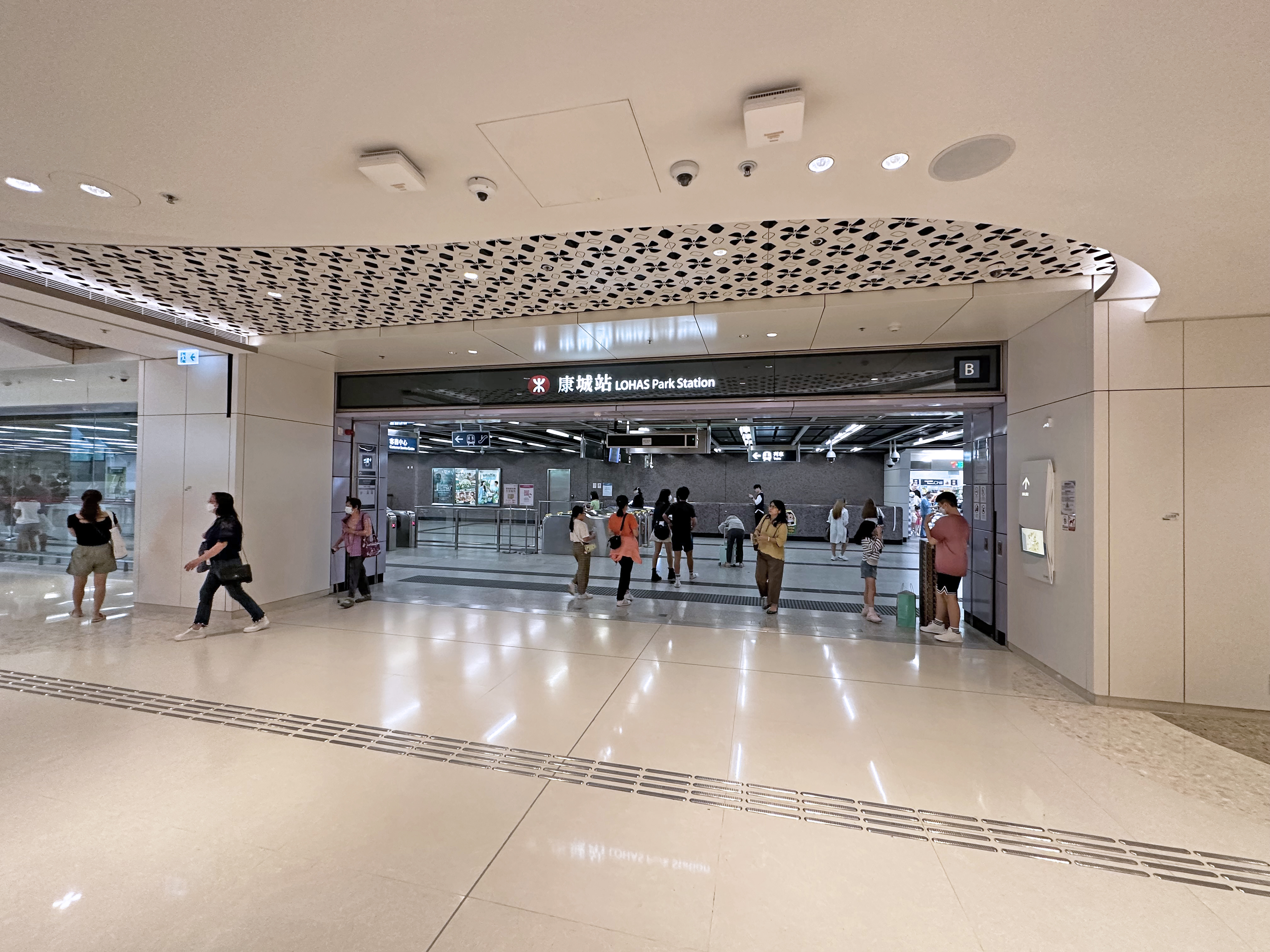
Exit B

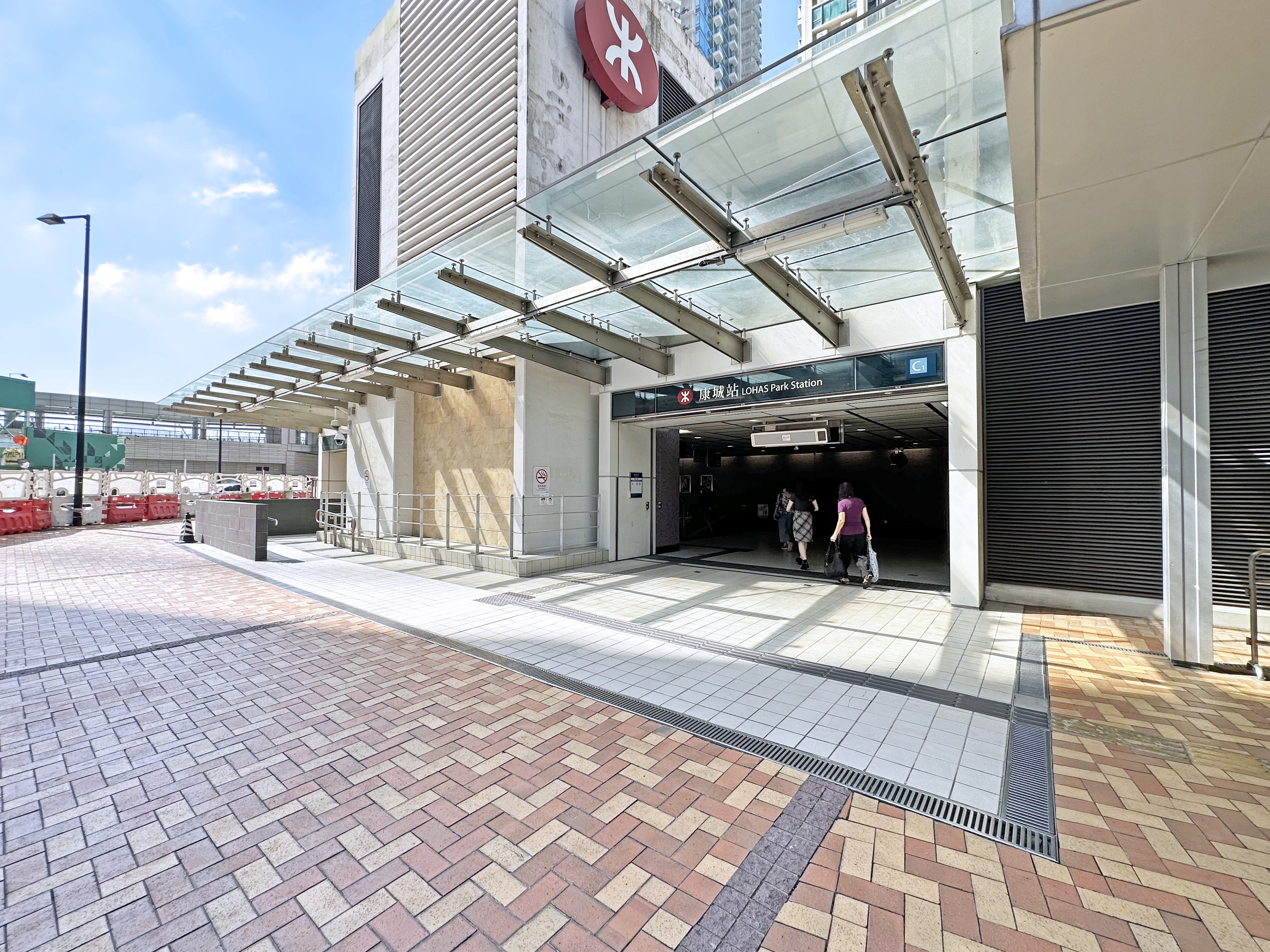
Exit C1

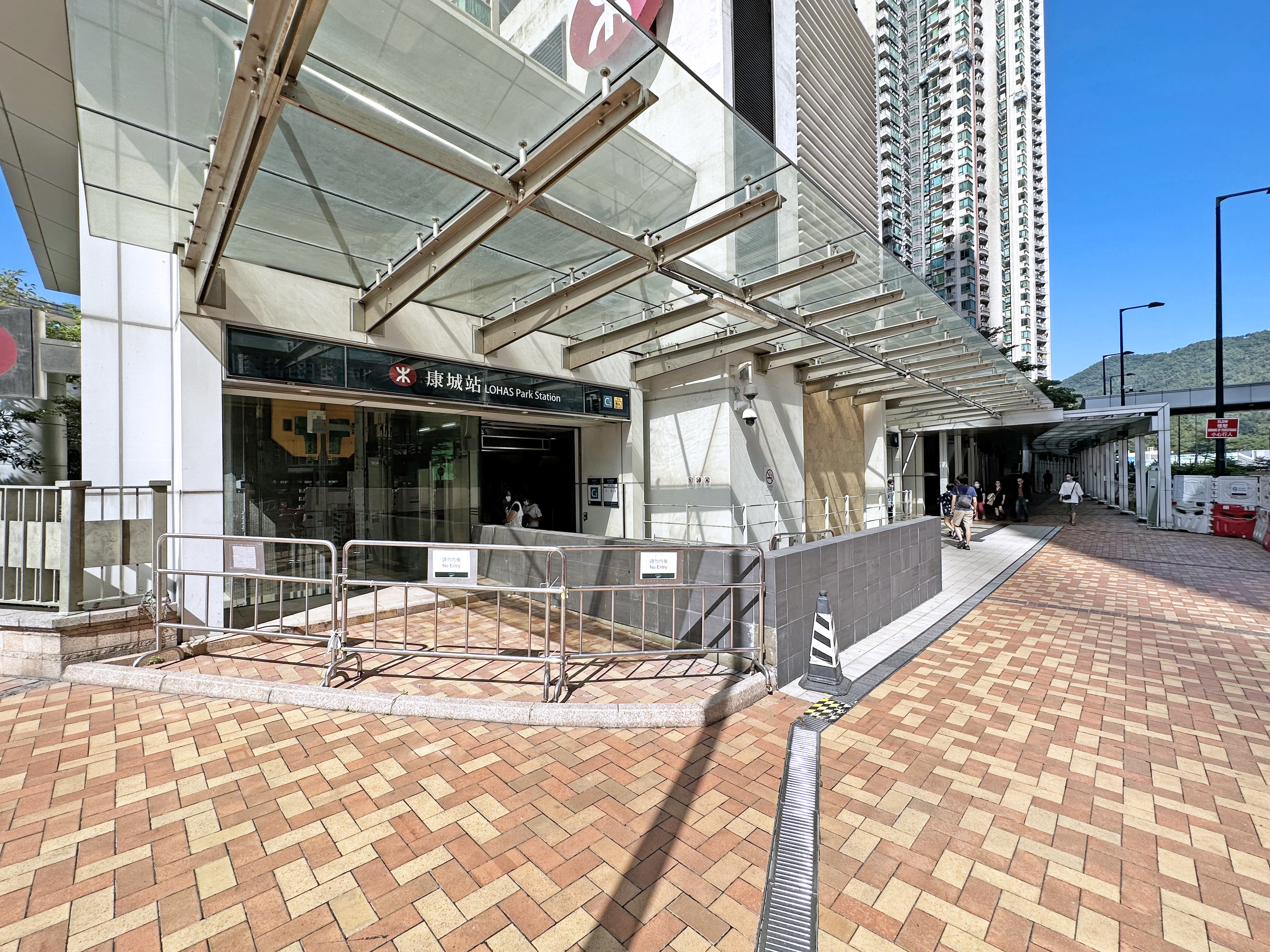
Exit C2

== Gallery ==
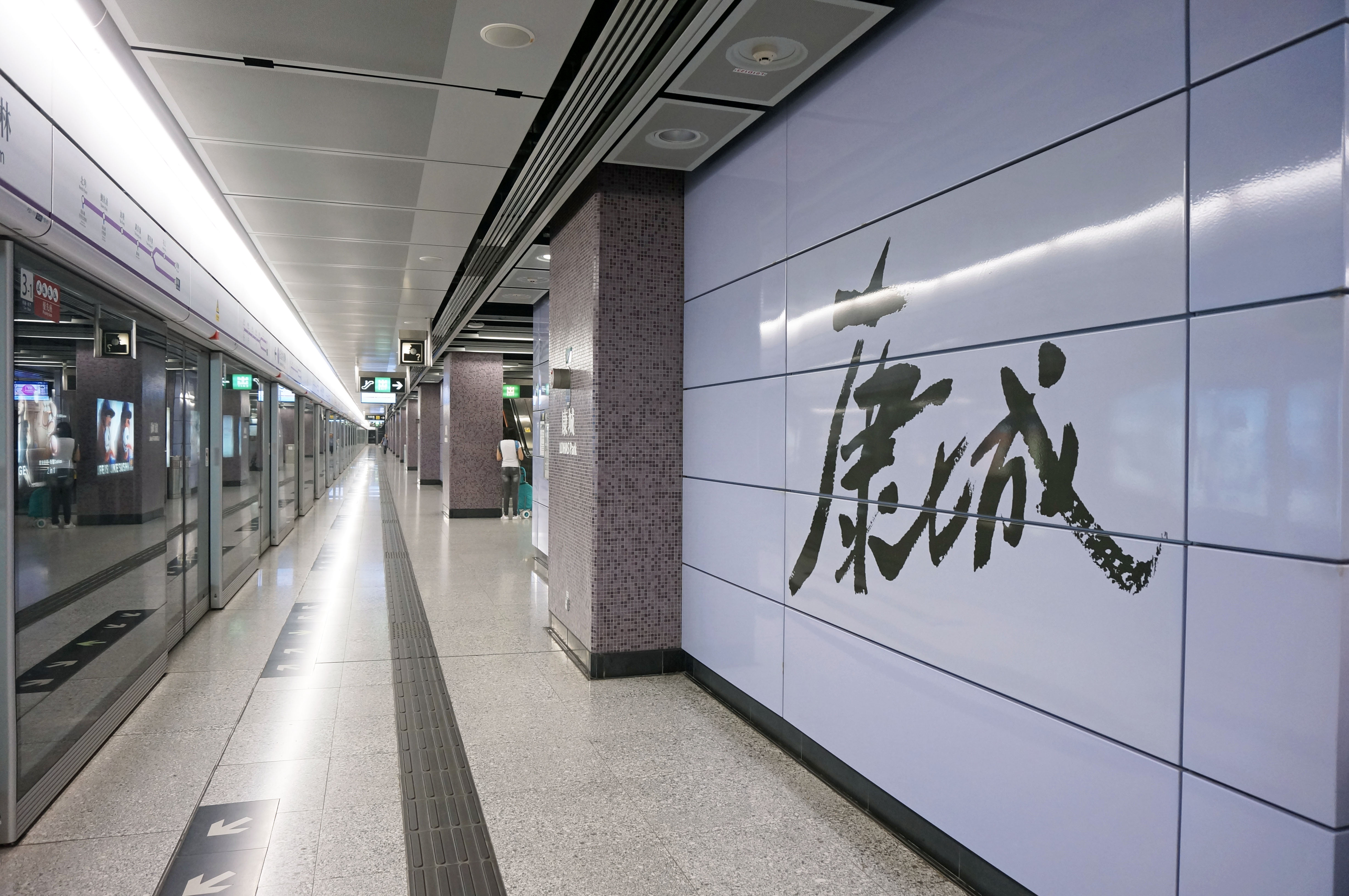
Platform 1

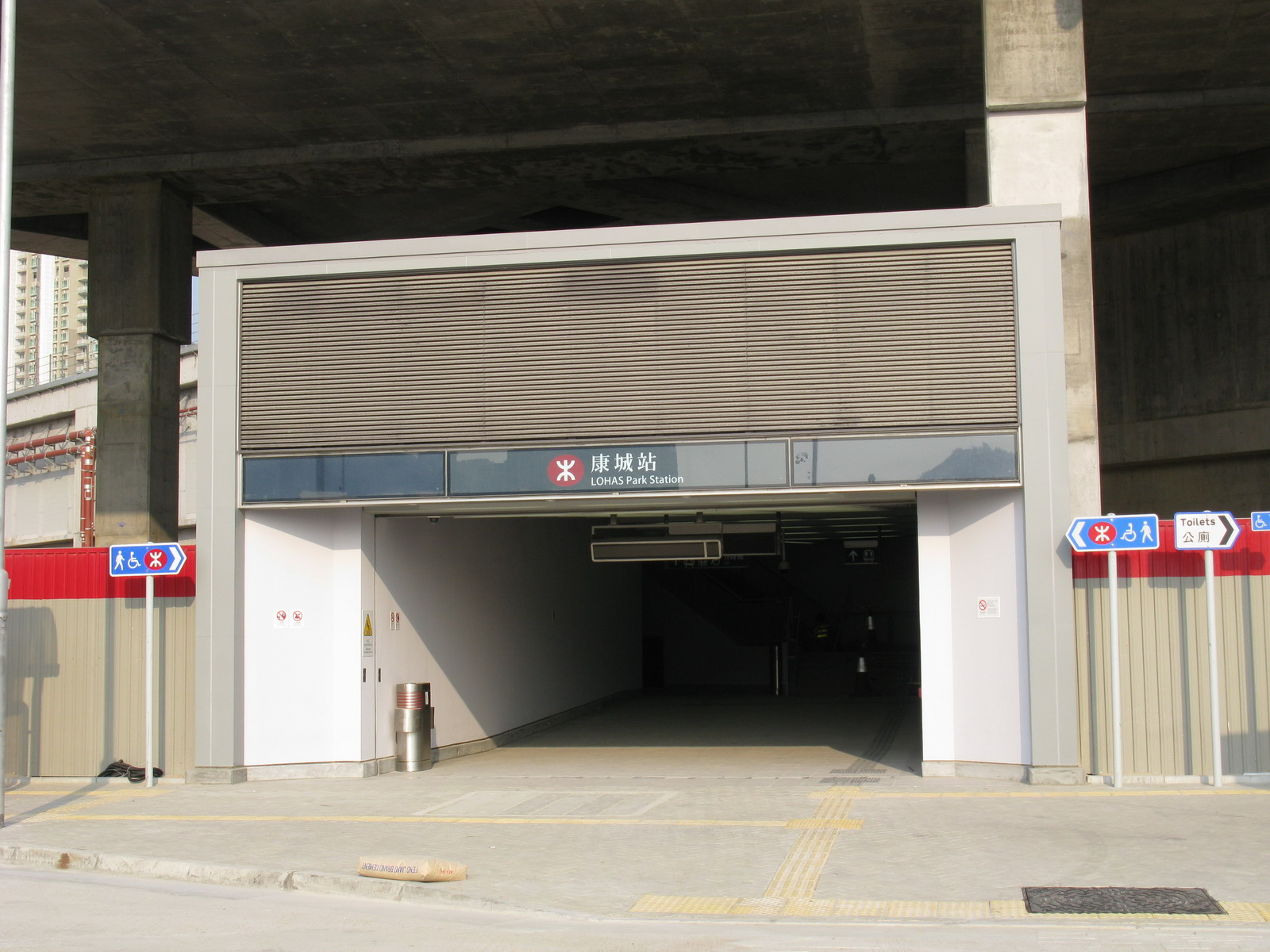
LOHAS Park station Exit A (closed 14 March 2022)

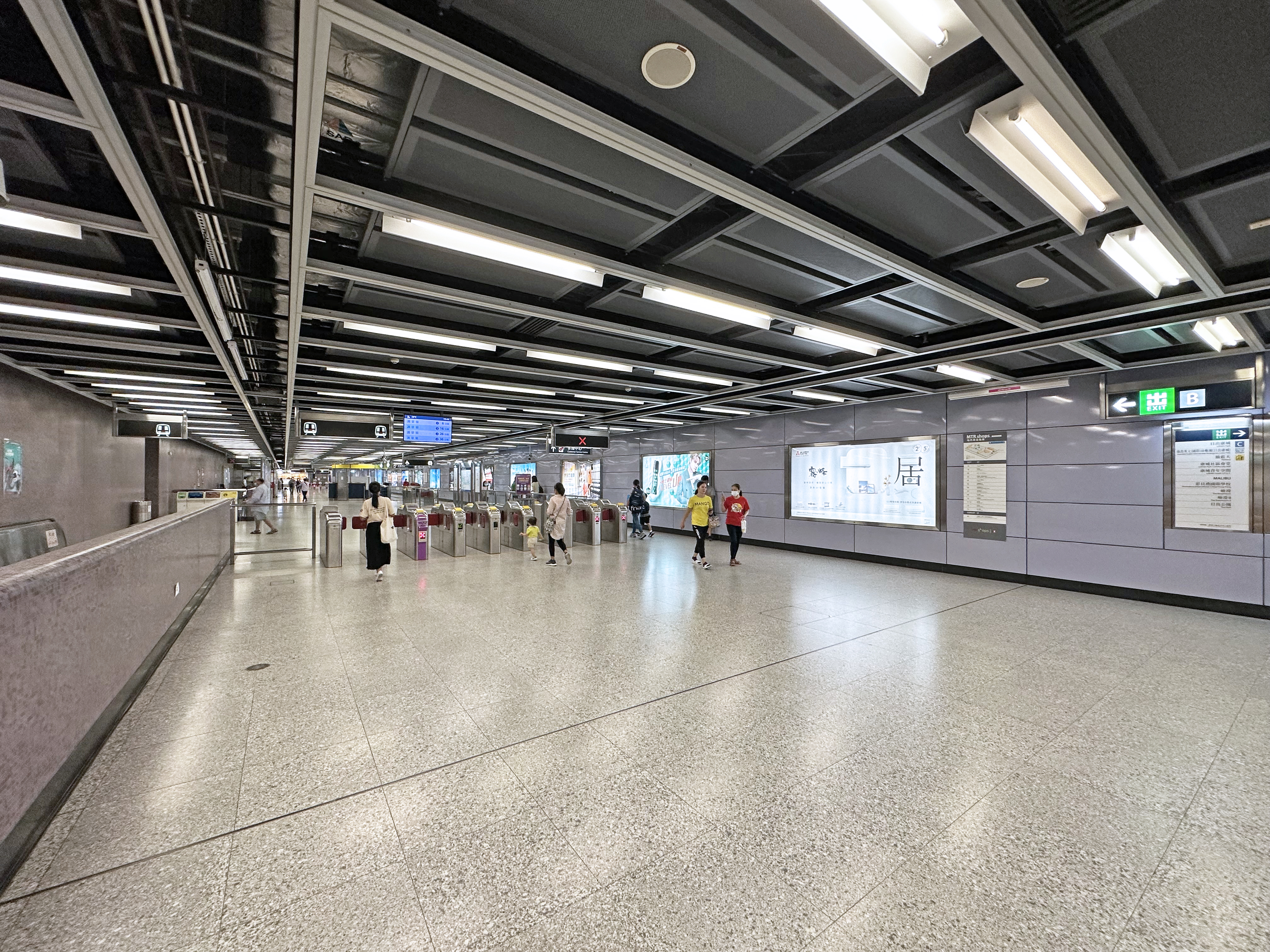
Concourse

== See also ==
- LOHAS Park
- Tseung Kwan O New Town
