= K train =

K Train or simply K may refer to:

- K (Broadway Brooklyn Local), earlier KK, discontinued in 1976
- K (Eighth Avenue Local), replaced the AA in 1985 and merged into the C in 1988
- K Ingleside, Muni Metro line serving the West Portal and Ingleside neighborhoods
- K Line (Los Angeles Metro), a light rail line in Los Angeles County, California
- MTR Rotem EMU, rolling stock on the Hong Kong MTR often referred to as "K-Train"
