= Tiu Keng Leng station =

MTR interchange station in the New Territories, Hong Kong

Tiu Keng Leng 調景嶺
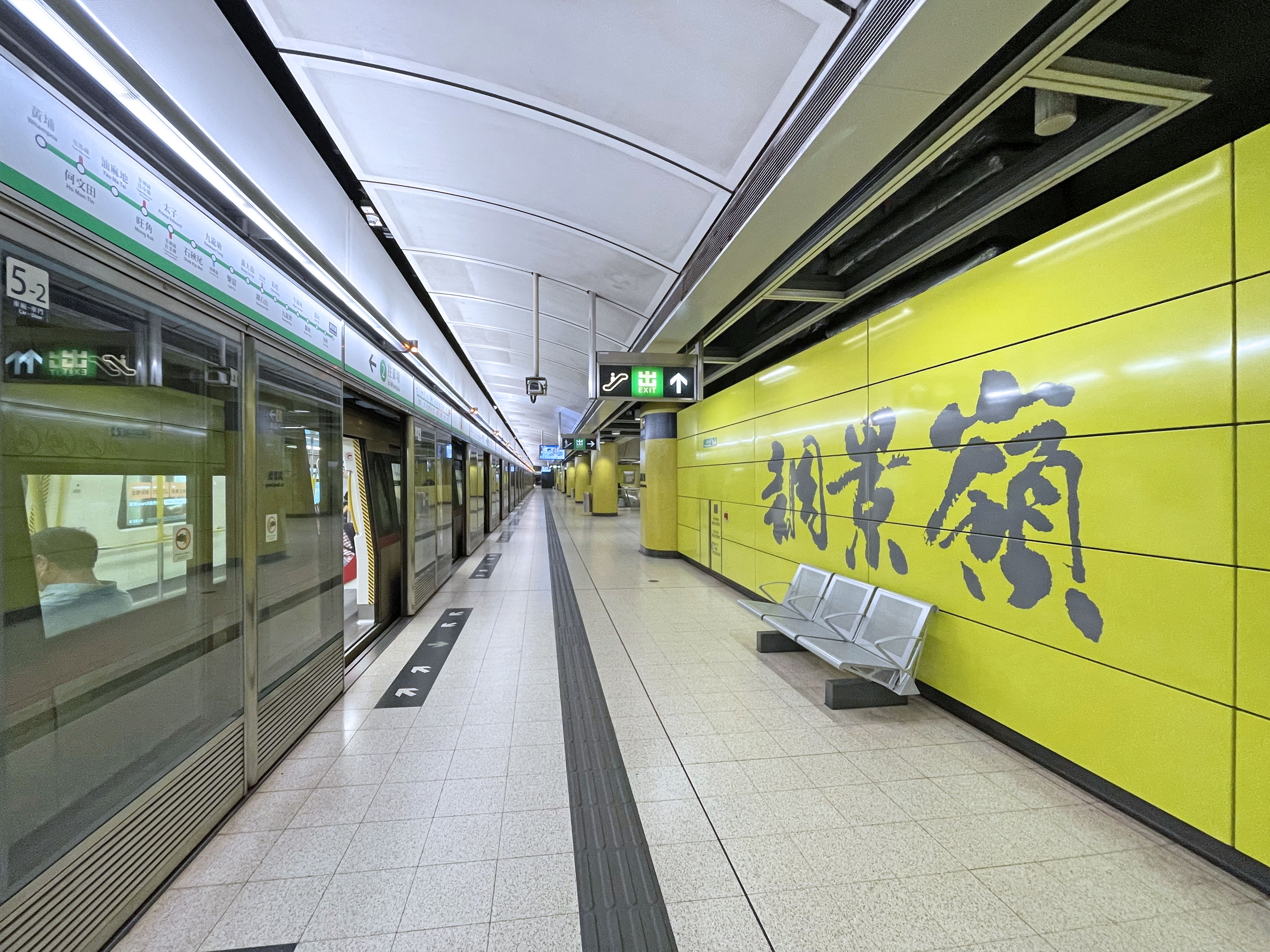
- Platform 2 of Tiu Keng Leng station in December 2022

Chinese name
- Traditional Chinese: 調景嶺
- Simplified Chinese: 调景岭
- Jyutping: Tiu4 ging2 leng5 / Tiu4 ging2 ling5
- Cantonese Yale: Tìuhgíngléhng / Tìuhgínglíhng
- Hanyu Pinyin: Tiáojǐnglǐng
- Literal meaning: Adjust Ridge
Transcriptions
Standard Mandarin
- Hanyu Pinyin: Tiáojǐnglǐng
Yue: Cantonese
- Yale Romanization: Tìuhgíngléhng / Tìuhgínglíhng
- IPA: [tʰiw˩kɪŋ˧˥lɛŋ˩˧]
- Jyutping: Tiu4 ging2 leng5 / Tiu4 ging2 ling5

General information
- Location: Metro Town, 8 King Ling Road, Tiu Keng Leng; Sai Kung District, Hong Kong
- Coordinates: 22°18′15″N 114°15′09″E
- System: MTR rapid transit station
- Owner: MTR Corporation
- Operator: MTR Corporation
- Lines: Kwun Tong line; Tseung Kwan O line
- Platforms: 4 (2 island platforms)
- Tracks: 4
- Connections: Bus

Construction
- Structure type: Underground
- Platform levels: 2
- Accessible: Yes
- Architect: Aedas

Other information
- Station code: TIK

History
- Opened: 18 August 2002; 24 years ago

Services
| Preceding station | MTR | Following station |
|---|---|---|
| Yau Tong towards Whampoa | Kwun Tong line | Terminus |
| Yau Tong towards North Point | Tseung Kwan O line | Tseung Kwan O towards Po Lam or LOHAS Park |
Track layout
U2 (upper level)
U1 (lower level)
Location
- Location within MTR

Tiu Keng Leng station is an MTR station located in Tiu Keng Leng. The station features cross-platform interchange between the Tseung Kwan O line and the Kwun Tong line, and serves as the eastern terminus of the Kwun Tong line and the western terminus of the Tseung Kwan O line for LOHAS Park shuttle. It is located between Tseung Kwan O and Yau Tong stations on the Tseung Kwan O line, and proceeds to Yau Tong station on the Kwun Tong line. It is the only station on the Kwun Tong line located in the New Territories. The livery of the station is yellow-green.

The station is situated next to the developments of Kin Ming Estate and Choi Ming Court. Its main entrance is located on Chui Ling Road. There is a public transport area outside the station for interchange to ground-level transport.

== History ==
Tiu Keng Leng station was built under the Tseung Kwan O Extension contract 602, which was awarded in 1999 to the Paul Y-CREC Joint Venture. The station opened on Sunday, 18 August 2002, the day the new Tseung Kwan O line fully opened for service.

Public toilets and a babycare room opened within the paid area on 20 February 2019 as part of an MTR expansion of facilities at interchange stations.

== Station layout ==
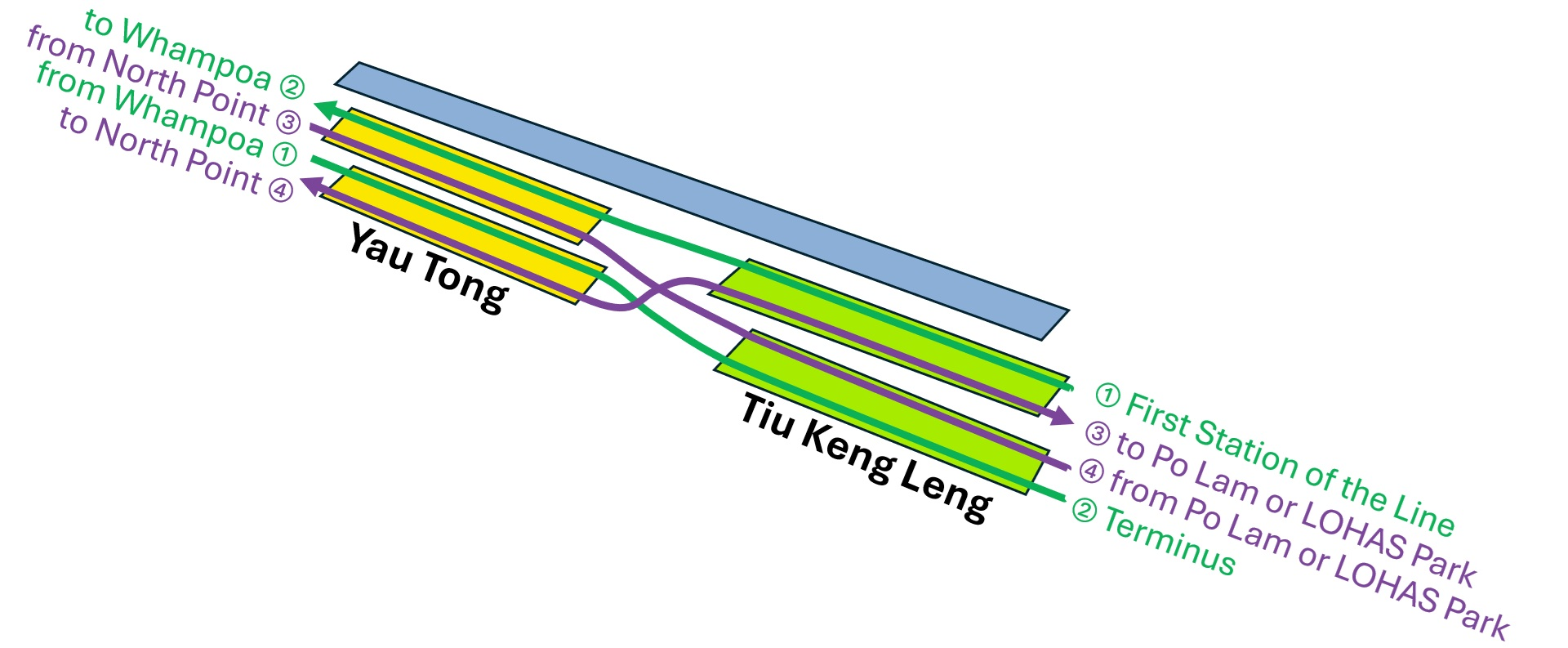
Three-level interchange at Tiu Keng Leng and Yau Tong

The multiple cross-platform interchange system between Tiu Keng Leng and Yau Tong

Passengers from Tseung Kwan O who wish to travel to other destinations in Kowloon can ride the Tseung Kwan O line to Tiu Keng Leng, where they can interchange at the opposite platform for the Kwun Tong line.

Passengers on the Kwun Tong line can ride on the line to the Tiu Keng Leng terminus where they can alight and walk over to the opposite platform to change to Tseung Kwan O line trains for Po Lam or LOHAS Park.

| G | Concourse | Exits, transport interchange |
| G | Concourse | Customer service, MTR shops |
| G | Concourse | Vending machines, automatic teller machines |
| L1; Upper Platforms | Platform 2 | ← Kwun Tong line towards Whampoa (Yau Tong) |
| L1; Upper Platforms | Island platform, doors will open on the left for Kwun Tong line, right for Tseung Kwan O line |
| L1; Upper Platforms | Platform 4 | ← Tseung Kwan O line towards North Point (Yau Tong) |
| L2; Lower Platforms | Platform 3 | Tseung Kwan O line towards Po Lam or LOHAS Park (Tseung Kwan O) → |
| L2; Lower Platforms | Island platform, doors will open on the left for Kwun Tong line, right for Tseung Kwan O line |
| L2; Lower Platforms | Platform 1 | Arrival platform for Kwun Tong Line trains |

=== Entrances and exits ===
- A1: Public transport interchange
- A2: Hong Kong Design Institute, Immigration Headquarters
- B: Metro Town, Le Point, Caritas Institute of Higher Education
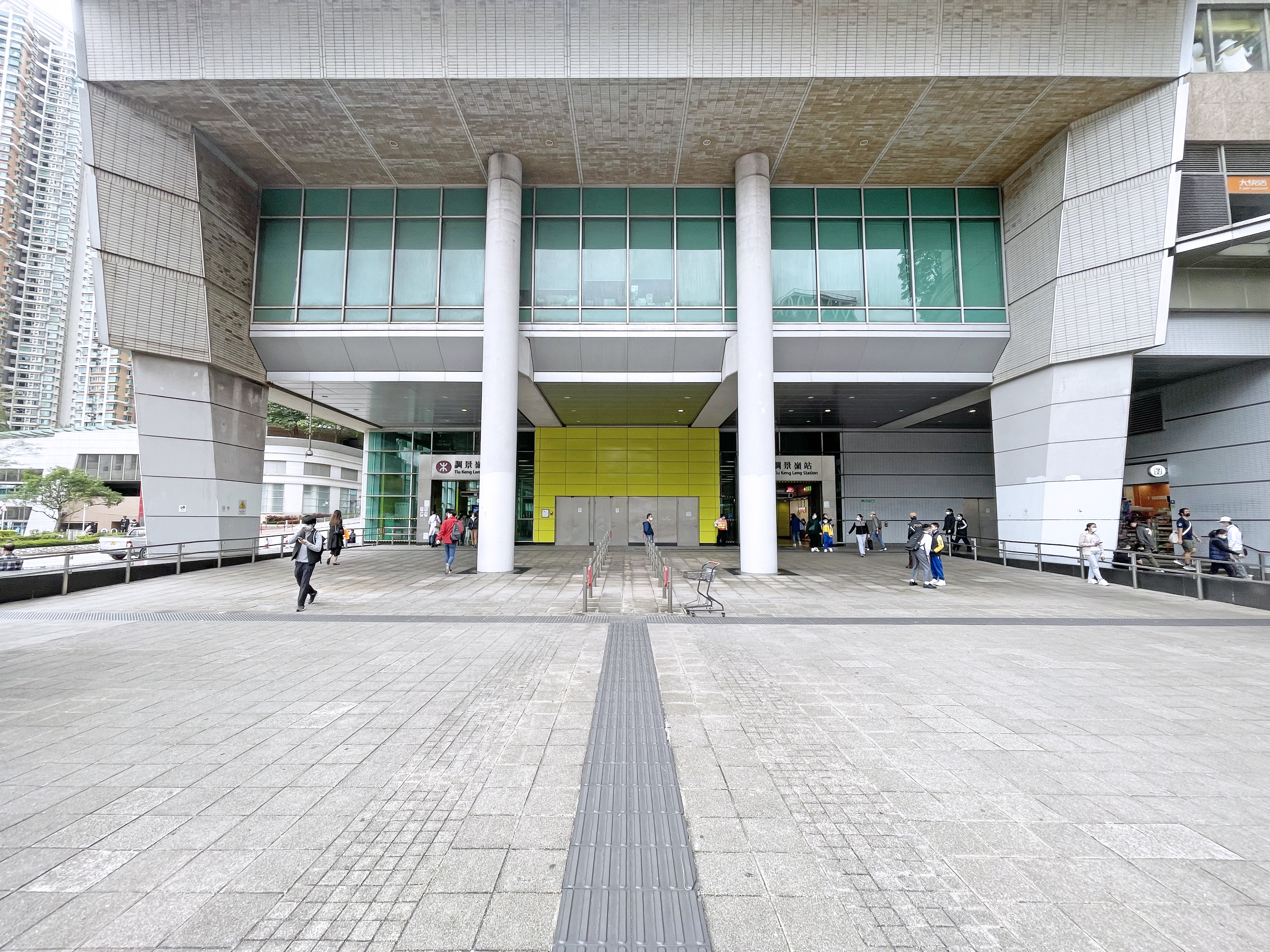
Exit A

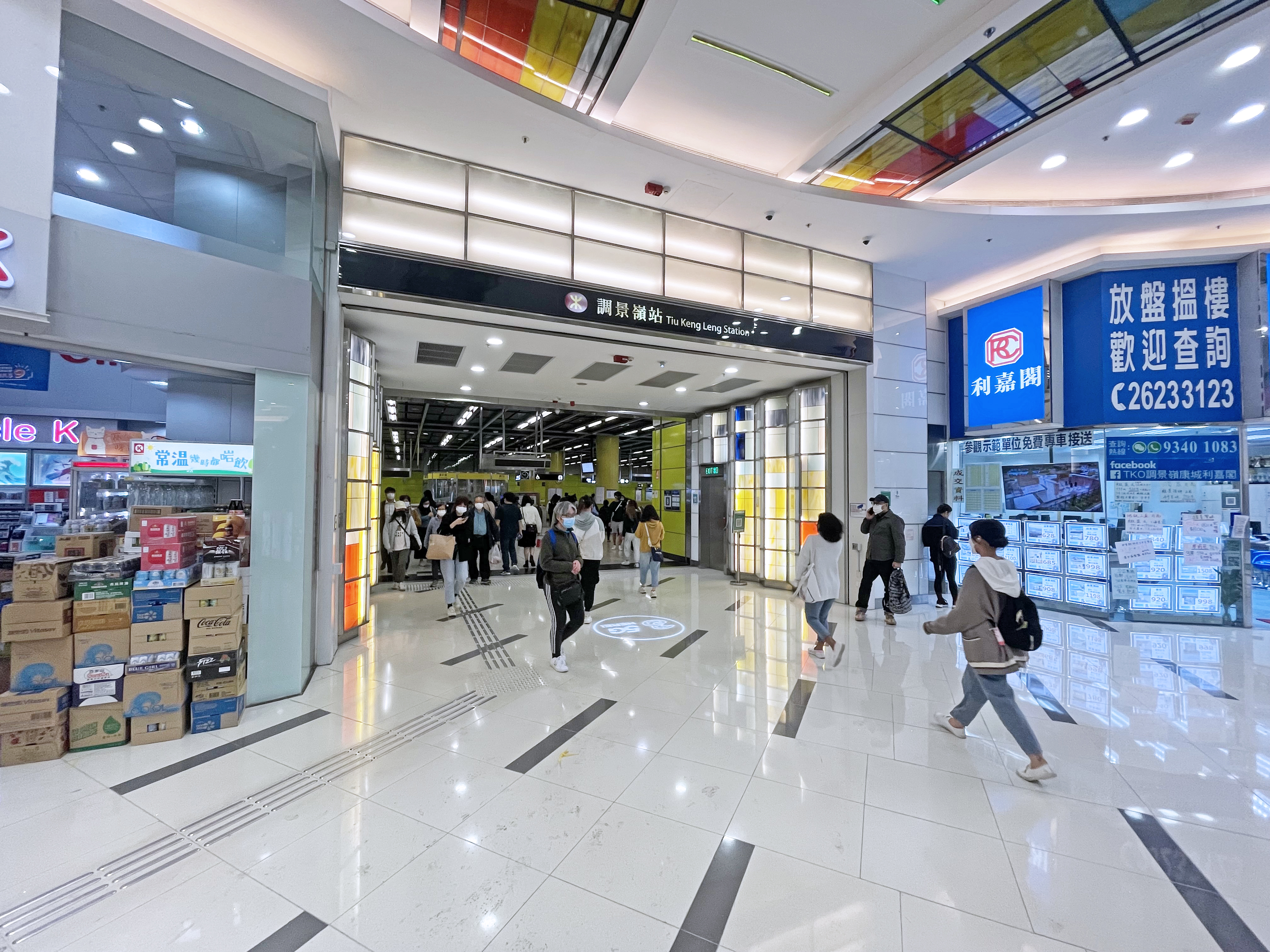
Exit B
