= Quarry Bay station =

MTR interchange station on Hong Kong Island

Quarry Bay 鰂魚涌
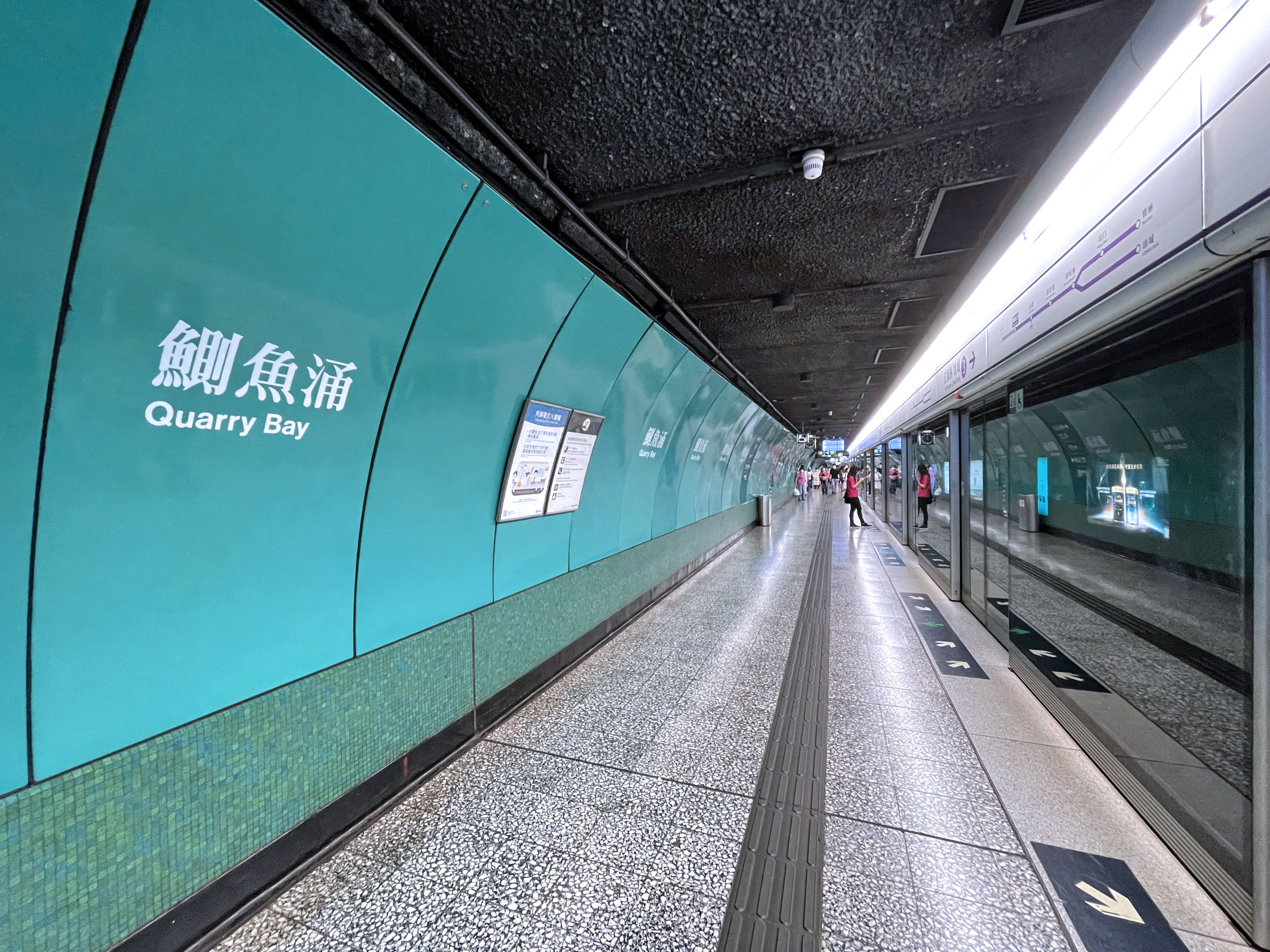
- Platform 3

Chinese name
- Traditional Chinese: 鰂魚涌
- Simplified Chinese: 鲗鱼涌
- Hanyu Pinyin: Zéiyúchōng
- Cantonese Yale: Jākyùchūng
- Literal meaning: Octopus stream
Transcriptions
Standard Mandarin
- Hanyu Pinyin: Zéiyúchōng
Yue: Cantonese
- Yale Romanization: Jākyùchūng
- Jyutping: Zak1jyu4cung1

General information
- Location: Near Wah Shun Gardens, King's Road, Quarry Bay; Eastern District, Hong Kong
- Coordinates: 22°17′16″N 114°12′35″E
- System: MTR rapid transit station
- Owner: MTR Corporation
- Operator: MTR Corporation
- Lines: Island line; Tseung Kwan O line
- Platforms: 4 (2 island platforms)
- Tracks: 4
- Connections: Bus, minibus; Tram

Construction
- Structure type: Underground
- Depth: 37 m (121 ft)
- Platform levels: 2
- Accessible: Yes

Other information
- Station code: QUB

History
- Opened: Island line : 31 May 1985; 41 years ago; Kwun Tong line : 6 August 1989; 37 years ago

Services
Preceding station	MTR	Following station
North Point towards Kennedy Town	Island line	Tai Koo towards Chai Wan
North Point Terminus	Tseung Kwan O line	Yau Tong towards Po Lam or LOHAS Park

Former services
Preceding station	MTR	Following station
Lam Tin towards Yau Ma Tei	Kwun Tong line (2001-2002)	North Point Terminus
Track layout
Upper platforms
Lower platforms
Location
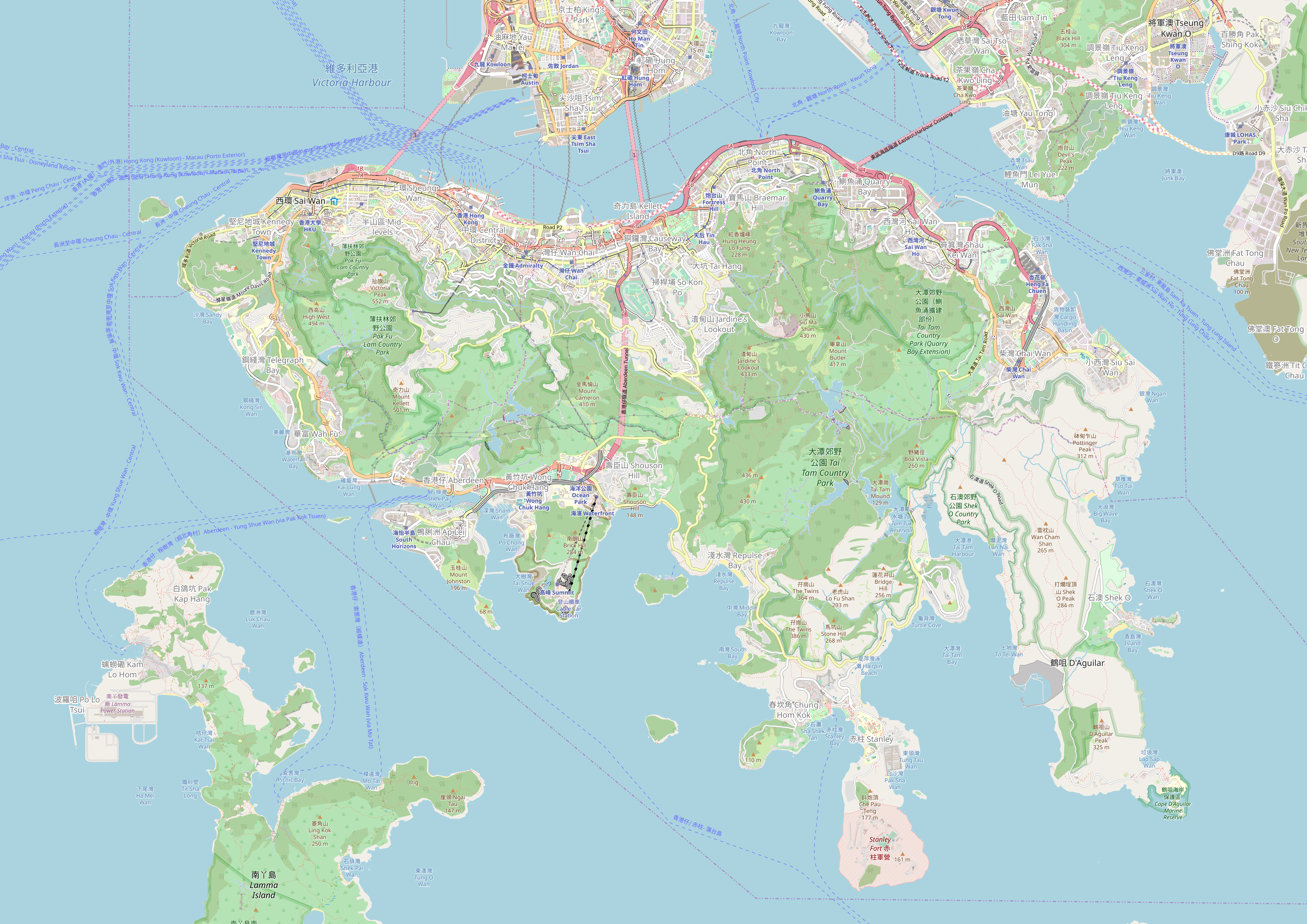
- Location within MTR Location within Hong Kong Island

Quarry Bay (Chinese: 鰂魚涌; Cantonese Yale: Jāk'yùhchūng) is a station on the Island line and Tseung Kwan O line of the MTR in Quarry Bay on Hong Kong Island. The station has a unique livery of teal.

== Location ==
As with all stations on the Island line, Quarry Bay is located on the northern shore of Hong Kong Island. Platforms 1 and 2 are built beneath King's Road to Pak Fuk Road. Platforms 3 and 4 are built beneath King's Road to the south of Model Housing Estate.

== History ==
The construction contract was awarded to Paul Y. Construction (now Paul Y. Engineering) and work started in 1982.

In the course of constructing Quarry Bay station, with the initial two platforms, 70,000 cubic metres (2,472,027 cu ft) of rock was excavated and 28,000 cubic metres (988,811 cu ft) of concrete was poured. The station opened as part of the first phase of the Island line on 31 May 1985. The station was expanded in 1989 with the addition of platforms 3 and 4, which served as the terminus of Kwun Tong line upon the opening of the Eastern Harbour Crossing.

The station was badly congested in the mid-1990s. With a capacity of 30,000 people per hour, it was "close to saturation". Contingency plans were developed to evacuate trains ahead of Quarry Bay to avoid overcrowding, while construction options were planned to alleviate the problem permanently. On 27 September 2001, the Quarry Bay Congestion Relief Works was completed, extending the Kwun Tong line to North Point station and providing an easier and more spacious interchange there for Central bound passengers. On 4 August 2002, the Kwun Tong line platforms began serving the newly opened Tseung Kwan O line instead.

== Station layout ==
The station is noted for having the deepest platforms in the MTR network by metres above sea level to allow the Tseung Kwan O line tunnel to traverse Victoria Harbour. They are also among the deepest by metres below ground level (with a maximum depth of 37 m (121 ft 5 in) below ground level,, although HKU and Sai Ying Pun stations are deeper) The station's concourses, however, are at ground level and open directly onto the street. As a result, four sets of escalators and many long passageways are necessary to connect the concourses to the deepest platforms. The walking time between concourse and Tseung Kwan O line platforms takes five minutes, therefore passengers are not allowed to enter the paid area of the station from seven minutes before the last train departs, which is different from the five minutes applied at other stations.

Since platforms 3 and 4 were built some time after platforms 1 and 2, no cross-platform interchange is available in Quarry Bay station. Commuters interchanging between the two lines have to walk through a long passageway and two flights of escalators for about five minutes to reach the platforms of the other line.

This inconvenience and increasing passenger numbers were what prompted the MTRC to undergo the Quarry Bay Congestion Relief Works, which extended the Kwun Tong line one station to the west to North Point station, where cross-platform interchanges are provided. The platform numbers of platforms 3 and 4 were switched when the Kwun Tong line was extended to North Point on 27 September 2001.

G	King's Road Concourse	Exits, Footbridge to Finnie Street
L1	Model Lane Concourse	Exits, Customer Service, MTRShops
L2; Platform	Platform 1	Island line towards Chai Wan (Tai Koo) →
L2; Platform	Island platform, doors will open on the right
L2; Platform	Platform 2	← Island line towards Kennedy Town (North Point)
L3; Platform	Platform 3	Tseung Kwan O line towards Po Lam or LOHAS Park(Yau Tong) →
L3; Platform	Island platform, doors will open on the right
L3; Platform	Platform 4	← Tseung Kwan O line towards North Point (Terminus)

=== Entrances and exits ===
- A: King's Road, Taikoo Place
- B: Finnie Street
- C: Model Lane, Harbour Plaza North Point

Entrances/exits A and B share the same concourse while entrance/exit C has a separate concourse.

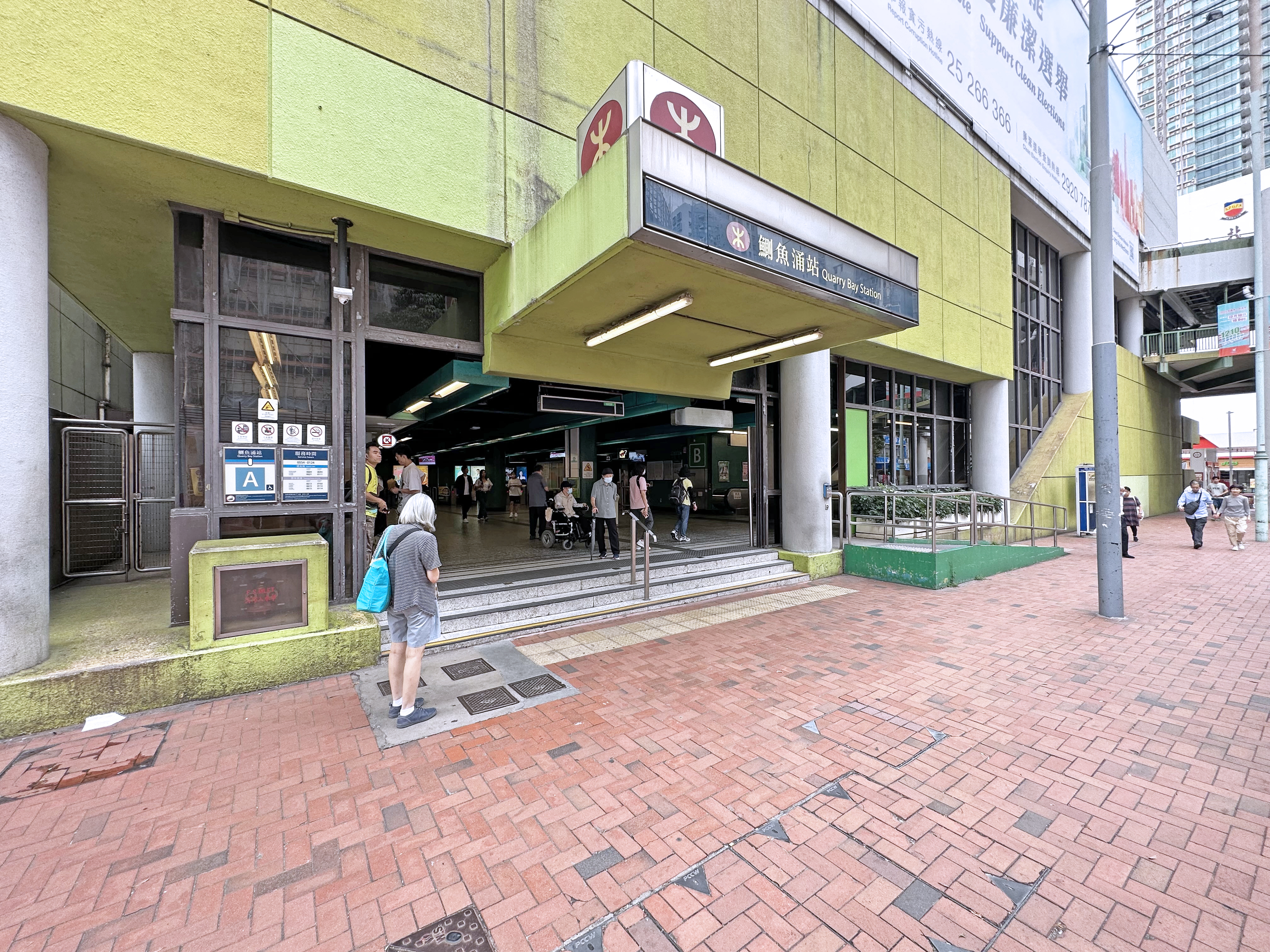
Exit A

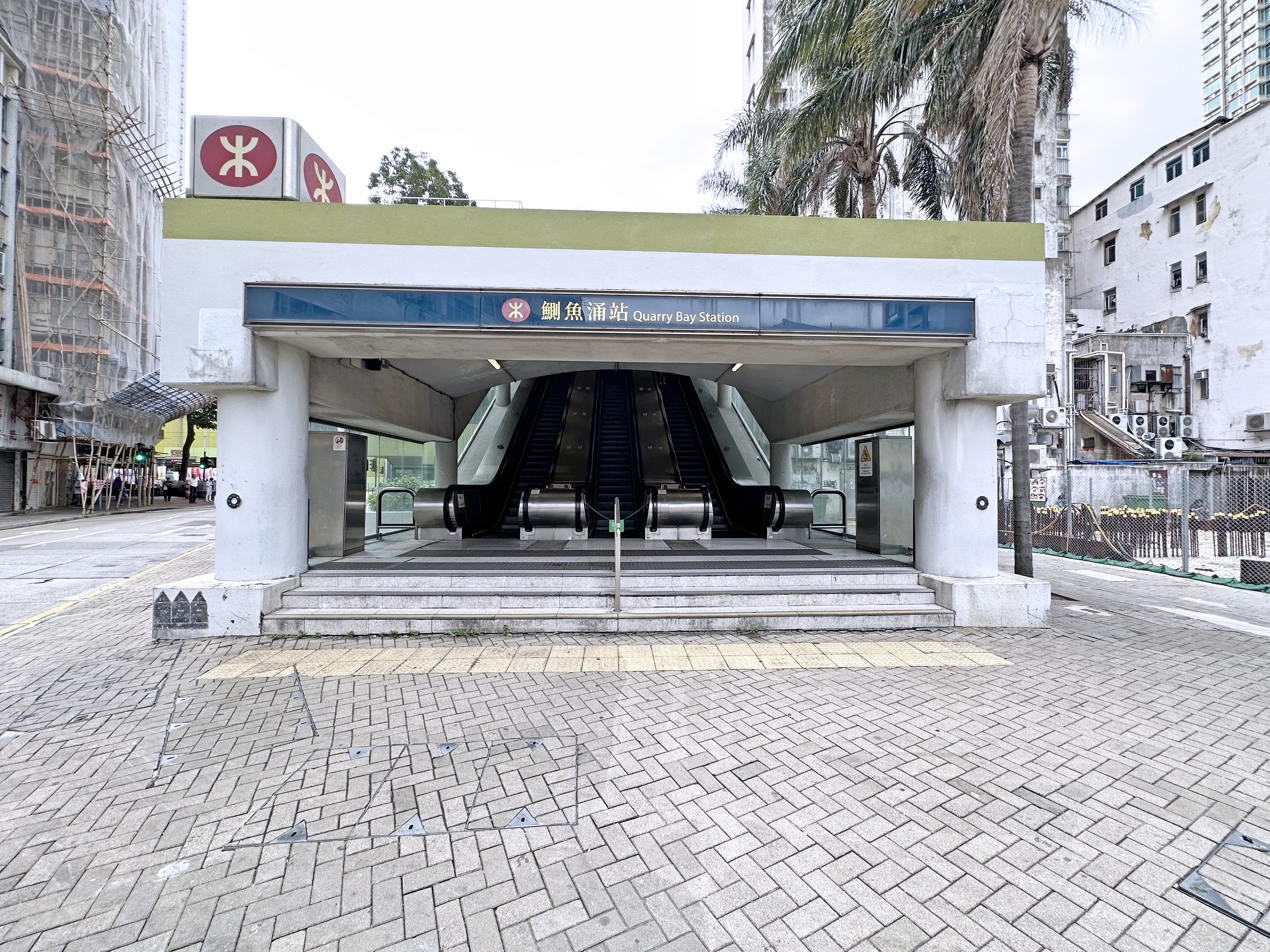
Exit B

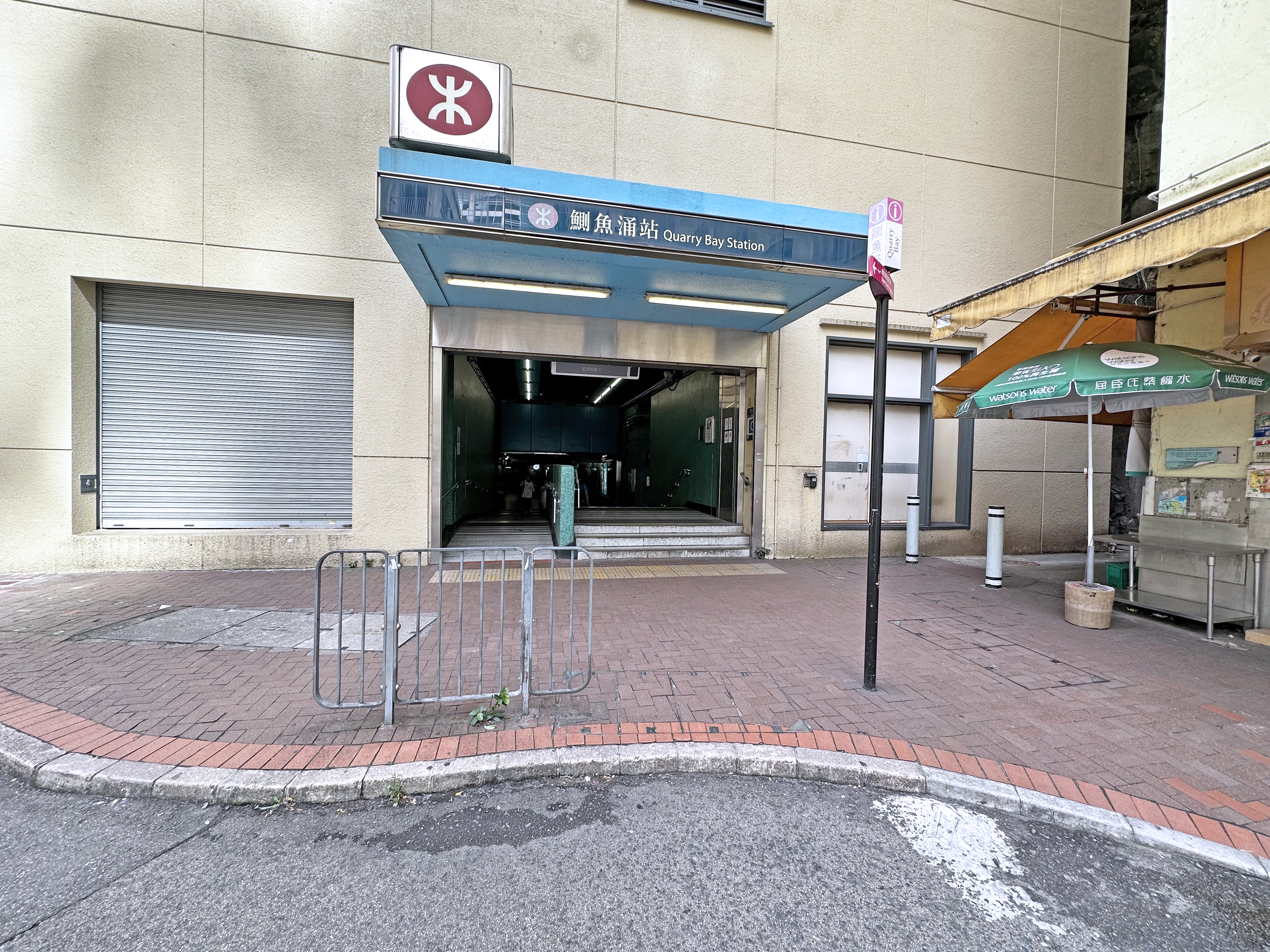
Exit C

=== Shops ===
- Circle K Mini-store
- Hang Seng Bank ATM
- Maxim's Cakes
- 2 Bank of China (Hong Kong) ATMs
- An automatic photo machine (Max Sight Photo-Me)
- A vending machine (Swire Coca-Cola)

== Gallery ==
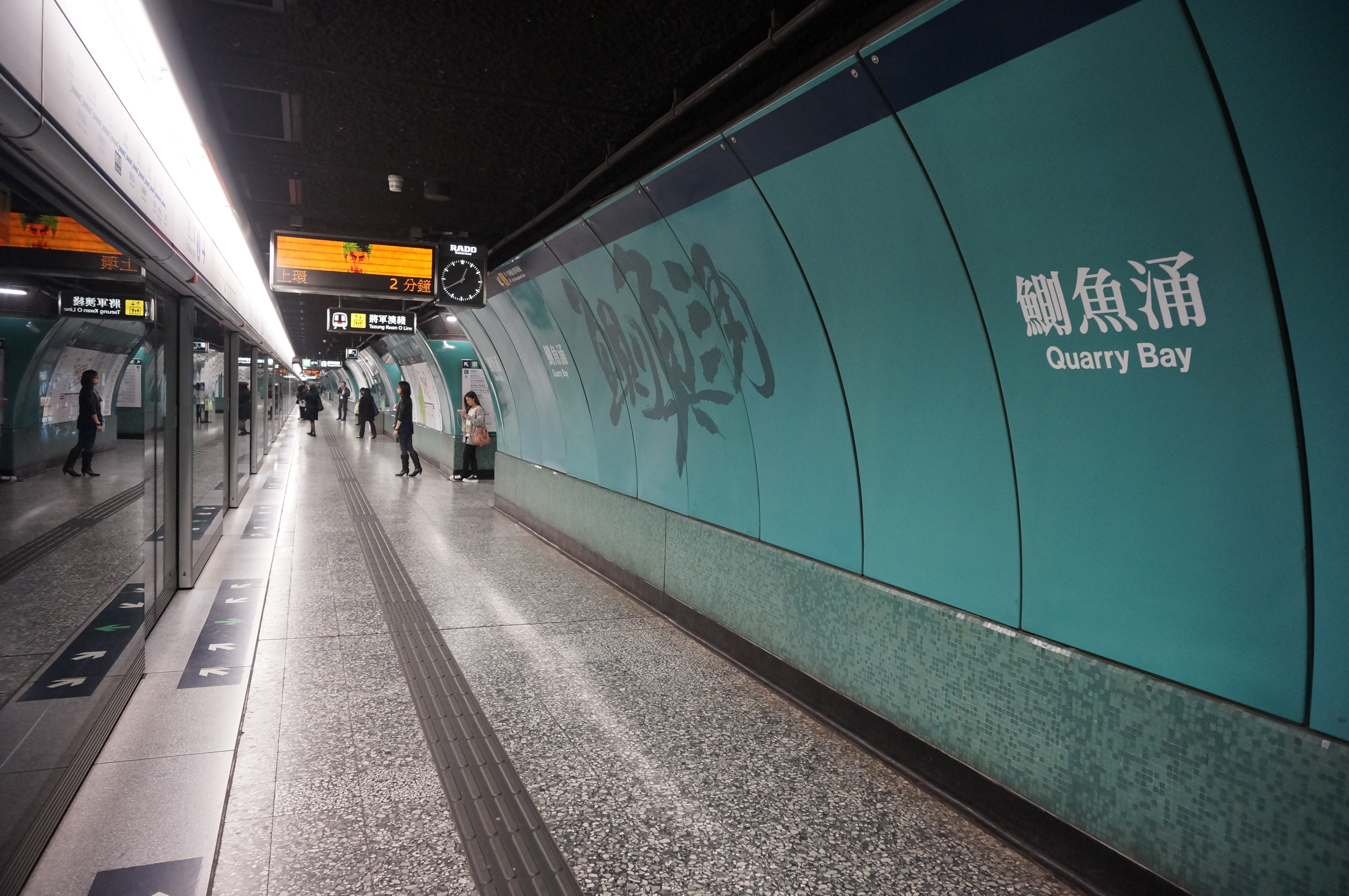
Platform 2 (Towards Kennedy Town)

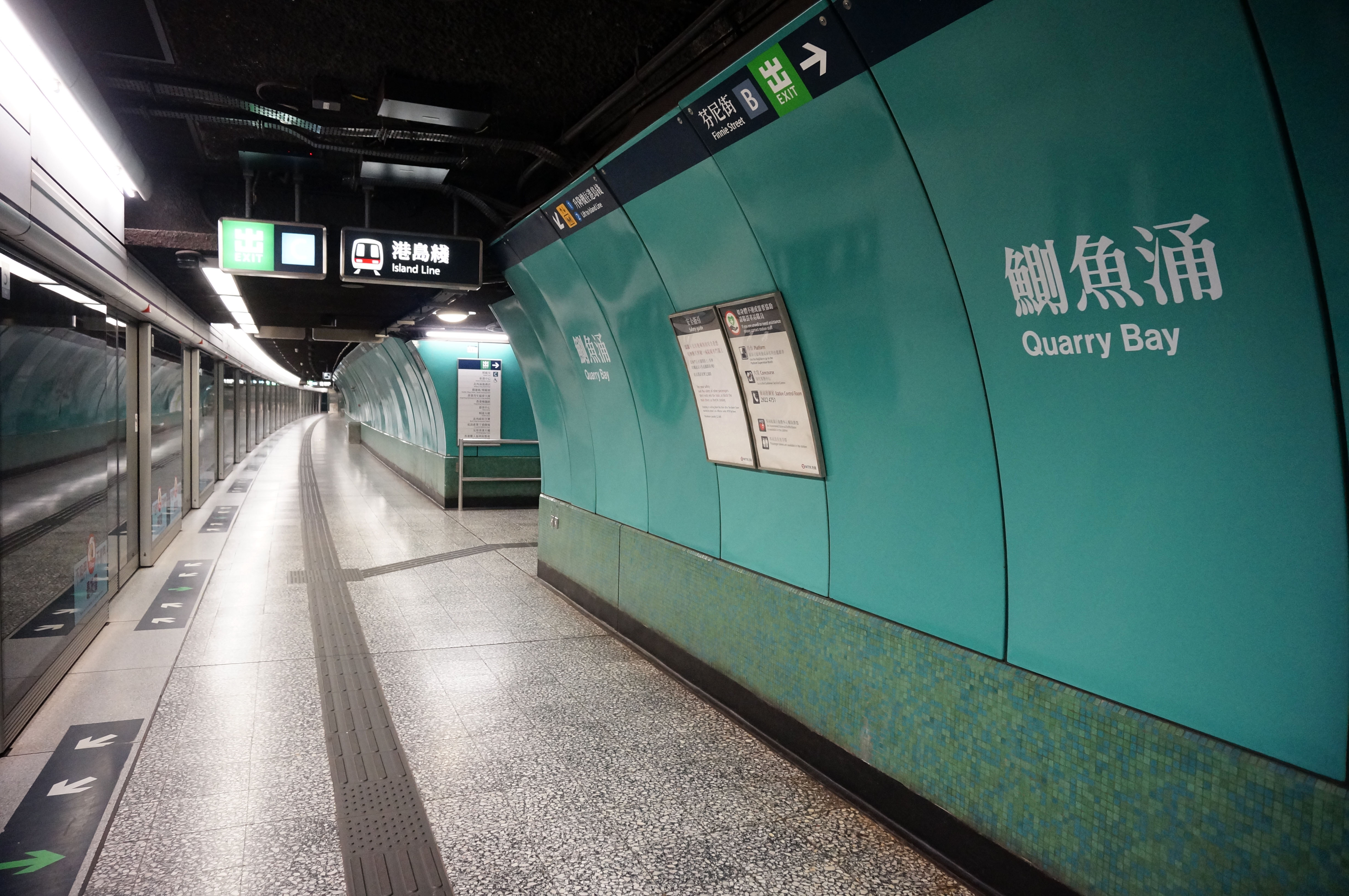
Platform 4 (Towards North Point)

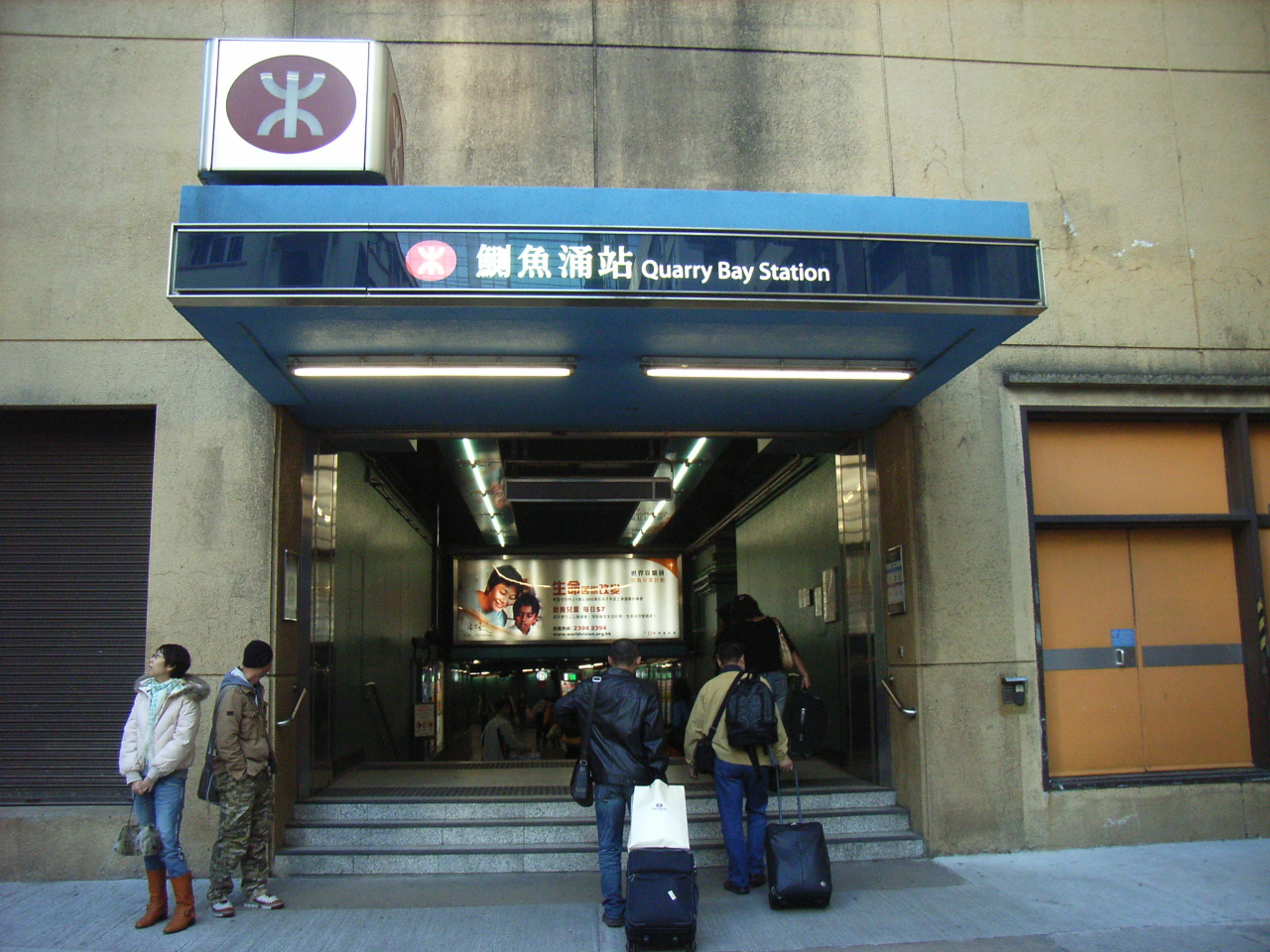
Exit C
