= Tseung Kwan O line =

Hong Kong MTR railway line

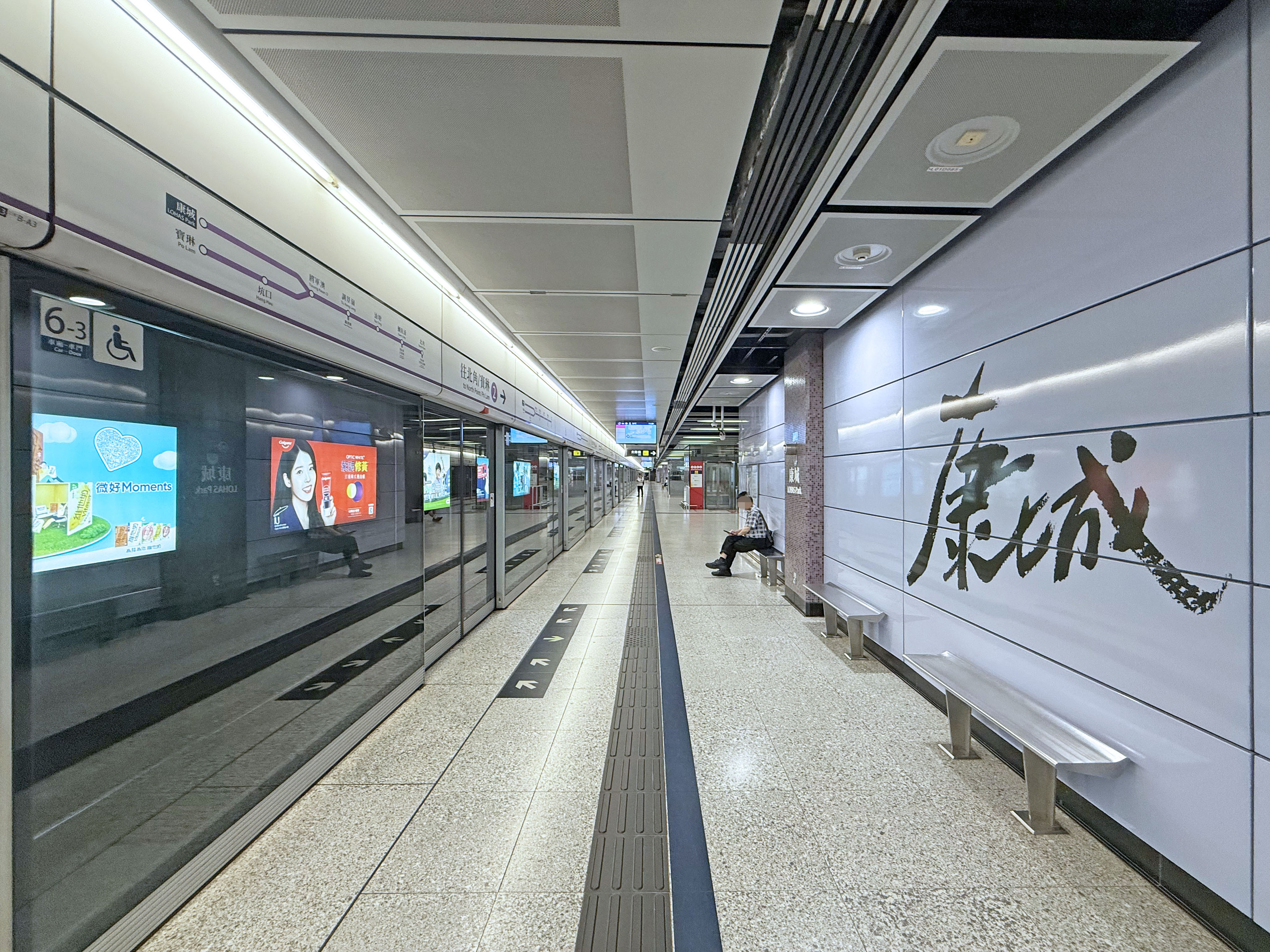
- Platforms of LOHAS Park station.

Overview
- Native name: 將軍澳綫
- Status: Operational
- Owner: MTR Corporation
- Locale: Districts: Sai Kung, Kwun Tong, Eastern
- Termini: Po Lam / LOHAS Park; North Point
- Connecting lines: Island line Via North Point, Quarry Bay; Kwun Tong line Via Yau Tong, Tiu Keng Leng
- Stations: 8
- Color on map: Purple (#7D499D)

Service
- Type: Rapid transit
- System: MTR
- Operator: MTR Corporation
- Depot: Kowloon Bay (2002-2009) Tseung Kwan O
- Rolling stock: Rotem EMU (K-Stock)
- Ridership: 333,300 daily average (weekdays, September 2014)

History
- Opened: 4 August 2002
- Last extension: 26 July 2009 (LOHAS Park)

Technical
- Line length: 12.3 km (7.6 mi)
- Num of tracks: Double-track
- Track gauge: 1,432 mm (4 ft 8 3/8 in)
- Electrification: 1,500 V DC (Overhead lines)
- Operating speed: Average: 33 km/h (21 mph); Maximum: 80 km/h (50 mph)
- Signalling: Advanced SelTrac CBTC (Future)
- Train protection system: SACEM (currently being replaced)
Route map

Tseung Kwan O line
- Traditional Chinese: 將軍澳綫
- Simplified Chinese: 将军澳线
Transcriptions
Standard Mandarin
- Hanyu Pinyin: Jiāngjūn'ào xiàn
Yue: Cantonese
- Yale Romanization: jēung gwān ou sin
- Jyutping: zoeng1 gwan1 ou3 sin3

The Tseung Kwan O line (Chinese: 將軍澳綫) is one of the ten lines of the MTR system in Hong Kong. It is currently 12.3 kilometres (7.6 mi) long, taking 15 minutes to travel throughout the entire line (including the LOHAS Park Branch Line).

The line runs from North Point on Hong Kong Island to the new town of Tseung Kwan O. It bifurcates east of Tseung Kwan O station into two branches, one northward to Po Lam and one southward to LOHAS Park. The Tseung Kwan O Depot at LOHAS Park is responsible for the maintenance of the line's rolling stock.

During the morning peak period, the Tseung Kwan O line uses 15 trains to maintain a frequency of 2.5 minutes between Tseung Kwan O and North Point.

== Route map ==
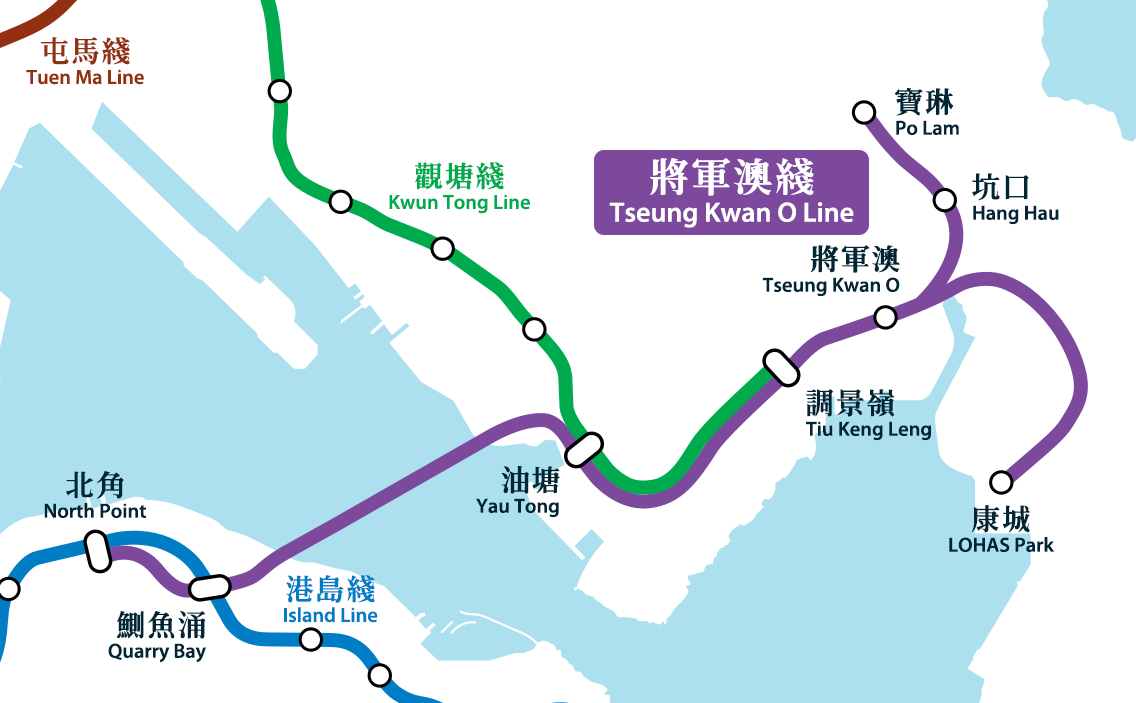
Geographically accurate map of the Tseung Kwan O line

== Route description ==
The Tseung Kwan O line is the first MTR line with no tracks on viaducts and is the only line without Automatic Platform Gates prior to the opening of the West Rail line (now the Tuen Ma line). It was the only line with tracks completely in tunnels until the completion of LOHAS Park station, which there are two short sections nearby that are not in tunnels. The stations of Yau Tong, Po Lam and LOHAS Park are at ground level, but are completely shielded to minimise noise to the surrounding development. The rest of the line has its tracks located underground.

The western terminus of the line is North Point, providing cross-platform interchange with the Island line. However, the next station, Quarry Bay, still interchanges with the Island Line but does not provide such a cross-platform interchange. East of Quarry Bay, the line passes under Victoria Harbour to Yau Tong station, a station serving the East Kowloon neighbourhood of the same name, using the rail tunnel of the Eastern Harbour Crossing. From Yau Tong, the line passes through the Black Hill Tunnels to enter Tseung Kwan O New Town at Tiu Keng Leng.

Within Tseung Kwan O new town, the line splits into two branches east of Tseung Kwan O station. One branch reaches Hang Hau and Po Lam stations in the northern part of the new town, whereas the southward branch connects LOHAS Park station in Area 86. LOHAS Park is a large residential development built above the Tseung Kwan O Depot, where the trains of the line are maintained.

=== Train operations ===
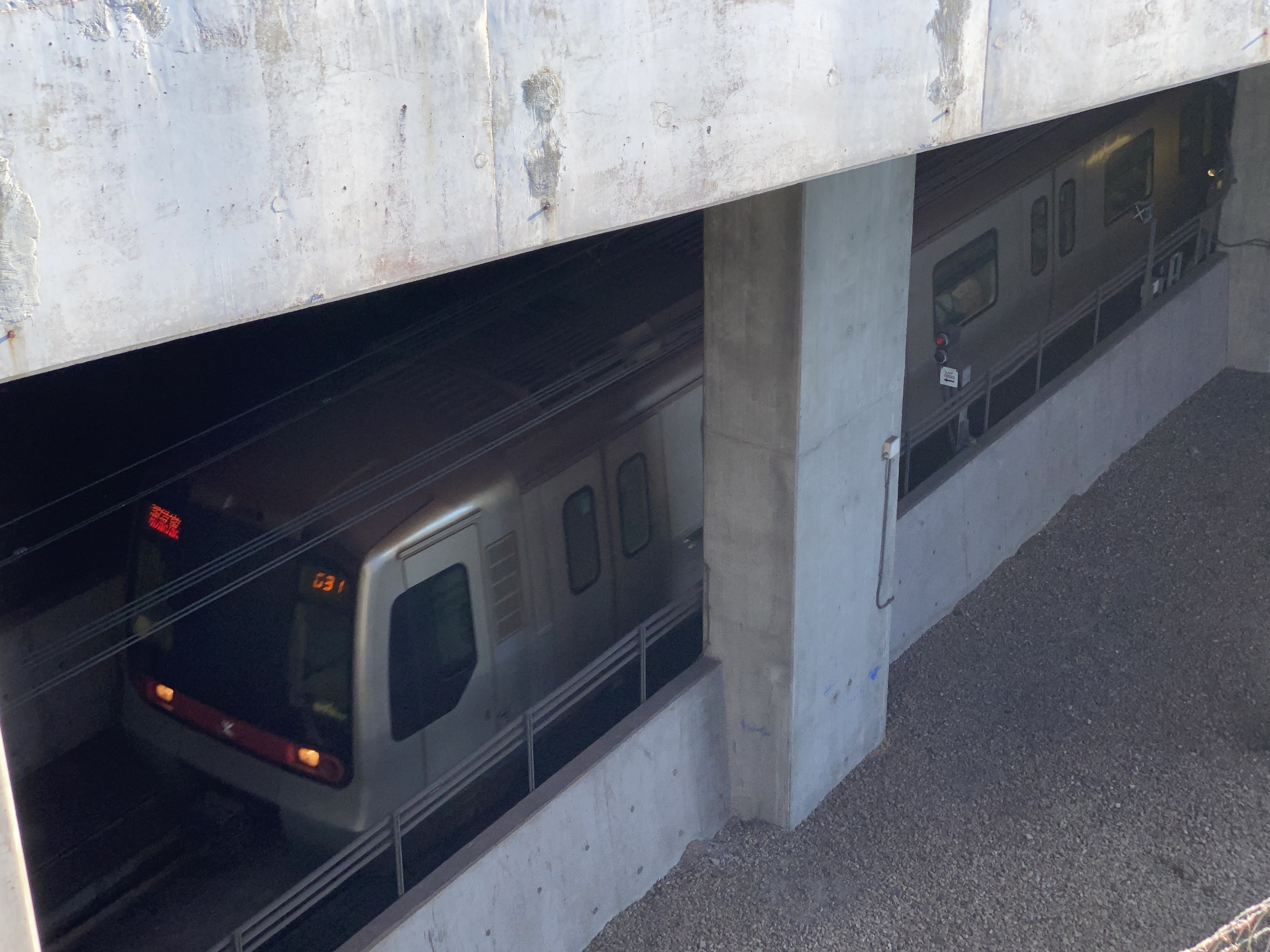
Rotem K-Train traveling through the LOHAS Park portal

Operation of the line is relatively complex because of the split into two branches at Tseung Kwan O.

The majority of trains on the line run through from Po Lam to North Point and vice versa. Through service between LOHAS Park and North Point is only provided during rush hour; during non-peak periods, LOHAS Park is only served by "shuttle trains" that terminate at Tiu Keng Leng, operating at 12-minute intervals. Passengers travelling to and from LOHAS Park during non-peak hours are required to change trains at Tiu Keng Leng or Tseung Kwan O in order to continue their journey.

Train headways are as follows:

- Rush hour: One through train to/from LOHAS Park after two trains to/from Po Lam
  - North Point - Po Lam trains: every 2.5 or 4 minutes
  - North Point - LOHAS Park trains: every 7–8 minutes
  - combined headway between North Point and Tseung Kwan O is 2.5 minutes.
- Non-peak period:
  - Mon-Fri, Sat (10:00-20:00) and Sun (09:00-20:00)
    - North Point - Po Lam trains: every 4 minutes
    - Tiu Keng Leng - LOHAS Park shuttle trains: every 12 minutes
    - No through service from LOHAS Park to North Point, vice versa
  - Every day between 20:00 and 00:00
    - North Point - Po Lam trains: every 5 minutes
    - Tiu Keng Leng - LOHAS Park shuttle trains: every 12 minutes
    - No through service from LOHAS Park to North Point, vice versa
  - Every day after 00:00
    - North Point to Po Lam trains: every 6 minutes
    - Po Lam to North Point trains: every 8–9 minutes
    - Tiu Keng Leng - LOHAS Park shuttle trains: every 12 minutes

== History ==
The Tseung Kwan O line was planned to serve the new town of Tseung Kwan O and was first proposed in 1981 as part of the Junk Bay New Town Transport Study. The report proposed four corridors, all of which called for the Kwun Tong line to be extended to Lam Tin station and placed the terminus of the Tseung Kwan O line at the vicinity of Tsui Ping Estate. The construction cost was estimated at HK$3 billion. The construction of the Tseung Kwan O line was approved by the Hong Kong Government in 1985 and under the 1985 plan, a 7 km (4.3 mi) branch line from Lam Tin station to Tseung Kwan O station, consisting of 5 or 6 stations, was to be built beginning in 1992 and to open by the end of 1996. This plan was cancelled by the MTR Corporation in August 1990.

MTR re-proposed the line in 1993, and had plans to further extend from the planned terminus of Lam Tin to Ma Tau Kok where it would have met the proposed East Kowloon Line. The plan was amended in 1996, where the Tseung Kwan O line would take over the existing cross-harbour segment via the Eastern Harbour Crossing to North Point station from the Kwun Tong line and the Kwun Tong line would be extended to Yau Tong and Tiu Keng Leng stations to interchange with the Tseung Kwan O line. The amended plan was approved by the Hong Kong Executive Council on 20 October 1998. Construction commenced on 24 April 1999 and the line opened on 18 August 2002, at a cost of HK$18 billion.

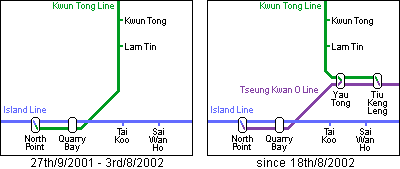
Realignment of Kwun Tong line upon the inauguration of Tseung Kwan O line

== Rolling stock ==
=== Trains ===
The line is served by the K-Stock and M-Trains. The K-Stock trains were manufactured by a consortium of Hyundai Rotem and Mitsubishi Corporation, and were expected to be quieter and to use energy generated from deceleration.

Although tailor-made for the line, the K-Stock trains actually ran on the Kwun Tong line temporarily from launch through April 2010, and the original M-Trains ran on this line instead. The K-Stock trains were finally transferred to this line in April 2010.

MTR Tseung Kwan O Line Rolling stock
Model	Manufactured	Time of manufacturing	Sets	Assembly	Notes
M-Train	Metro-Cammell	1977-1986; 1989-1995	7	A-C+D+B-C+D+C-A	To be replaced by the new Q-Trains
K-Train	Hyundai Rotem and Mitsubishi Heavy Industries	2001-2002	13	A-C-B+B-C+B-C-A
MTR Tseung Kwan O Line Former rolling stock
Model	Manufactured	Time in manufacturing	Sets	Assembly	Notes
C-Train	CNR Changchun	2010-2013	N/A	A-C-B+B-C+B-C-A	now used on Kwun Tong line

== Stations ==
This is a list of the stations on the Tseung Kwan O line.

List

Service		Livery	Station Name		Length (km)	Images	Interchange; Adjacent transportation	Opening	District
Normal	To and from LOHAS Park	Livery	English	Chinese	Length (km)	Images	Interchange; Adjacent transportation	Opening	District
Tseung Kwan O Line (TKL)
●	●		North Point	北角	0.0		Island line towards Kennedy Town	27 September 2001; 25 years ago (Note: Originally opened as part of the Kwun Tong line.)	Eastern
●	●		Quarry Bay	鰂魚涌	0.9		Island line towards Chai Wan	6 August 1989; 37 years ago	Eastern
●	●		Yau Tong	油塘	4.3		Kwun Tong line	4 August 2002; 24 years ago	Kwun Tong
●	●		Tiu Keng Leng	調景嶺	6.4		Kwun Tong line	18 August 2002; 24 years ago	Sai Kung
●	●		Tseung Kwan O	將軍澳	7.3		—	18 August 2002; 24 years ago	Sai Kung
●	|		Hang Hau	坑口	8.5		—	18 August 2002; 24 years ago	Sai Kung
●	|		Po Lam	寶琳	9.6		—	18 August 2002; 24 years ago	Sai Kung
LOHAS Park Branch Line
	●		LOHAS Park	康城	10.5		—	26 July 2009; 17 years ago	Sai Kung

== Future development ==
As part of the shelved North Island line project, the Tseung Kwan O line was proposed to be extended to Tamar station and interchange with an extended Tung Chung line there. This is according to the "interchange scheme" devised for the North Island line, which would also see the line serve stations at Causeway Bay North and Exhibition Centre, the latter of which would provide a connection with the Sha Tin to Central Link extension of the North South Corridor (East Rail Line to Admiralty). The extension is not expected to open before 2046.

Under an earlier proposal, called the "swap scheme", the line would have taken over the section of the Island line from Fortress Hill to Kennedy Town; with the remaining section east of Tin Hau being transferred to the Tung Chung line. This was rejected as the existing Island line would be interrupted and require an interchange.

In the Chief Executive's 2022 Policy Address, it was announced that the Tseung Kwan O line would be extended southwards to Tseung Kwan O Area 137, an 80 hectare plot of land the Development Bureau has identified suitable for the development of 50,000 new housing units. Area 137 is expected to take in new populations in 2030, but there has been no expected timeline for the completion of the extensions or the opening of the new station.

== See also ==
- Transport in Hong Kong
- List of areas of Hong Kong
