= Po Lam station =

Hong Kong MTR station

Po Lam 寶琳
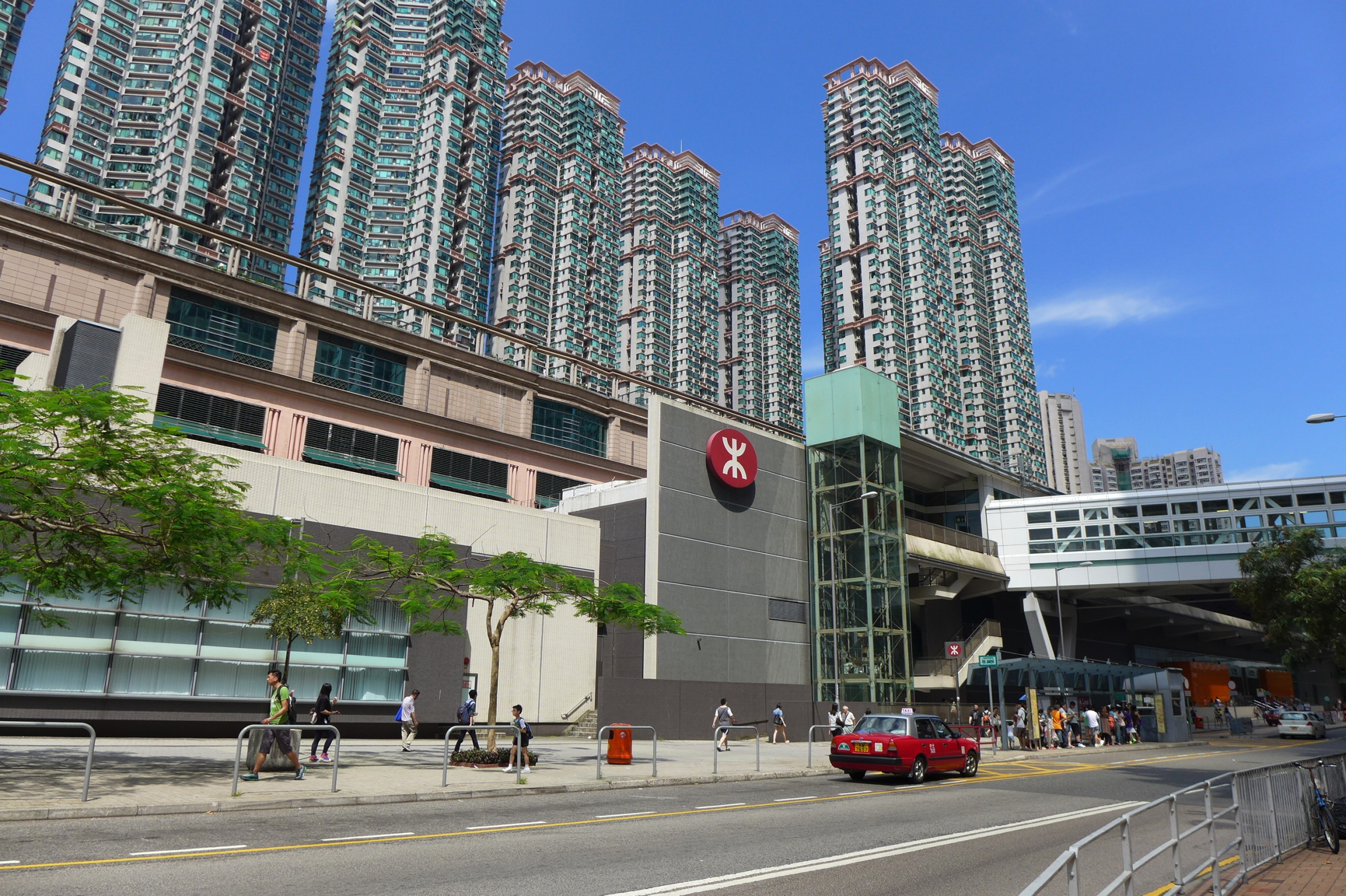
- Exterior of Po Lam station in 2014

Chinese name
- Traditional Chinese: 寶琳
- Simplified Chinese: 宝林
- Literal meaning: Pauline
Transcriptions

General information
- Location: Mau Yip Road, Po Lam; Tseung Kwan O, Sai Kung District; Hong Kong
- Coordinates: 22°19′21″N 114°15′29″E
- System: MTR rapid transit station
- Owner: MTR Corporation
- Operator: MTR Corporation
- Line: Tseung Kwan O line
- Platforms: 1 side platform)
- Tracks: 1

Construction
- Structure type: At-grade, fully covered
- Platform levels: 1
- Accessible: Yes
- Architect: RMJM Hong Kong Ltd.

Other information
- Station code: POA

History
- Opened: 18 August 2002; 24 years ago

Services
Preceding station	MTR	Following station
Hang Hau towards North Point	Tseung Kwan O line	Terminus
Track layout
Location
- Location within MTR

Po Lam (Chinese: 寶琳; Cantonese Yale: Bóulàhm) is the northern terminus MTR station of the Tseung Kwan O line. It is located on Mau Yip Road, Po Lam, in the New Territories of Hong Kong, sandwiched by Phases 1 to 3 of Metro City. Built by Maeda Corporation, it opened on 18 August 2002. The name of the station is taken from the nearby Po Lam Road North. Its color is dark orange.

== Station layout ==
U1	Footbridge (Exit A1, B2)	Metro City Phases 1 and 3
U1	Footbridge (Exit A1, B2)	Vending machines, ATMs, MTR Shops
U1	Footbridge (Exit A2, B1)	Metro City Phase 2, Transport interchange, Footbridges to Po Lam Estate, Yan Ming Court
U1	Footbridge (Exit B3)	Footbridges to rooftop garden, The Pinnacle, King Lam Estate; Tseung Kwan O Public Library, Tseung Kwan O Swimming Pool
G Concourse/ Platforms	Platform 1	← Tseung Kwan O line towards North Point (Hang Hau)
G Concourse/ Platforms	Side platform, doors will open on the left
G Concourse/ Platforms	Concourse	Exit C, Customer service, MTR Shops
G Concourse/ Platforms	Concourse	Vending machines
G Concourse/ Platforms	Concourse	Octopus card promotion machines

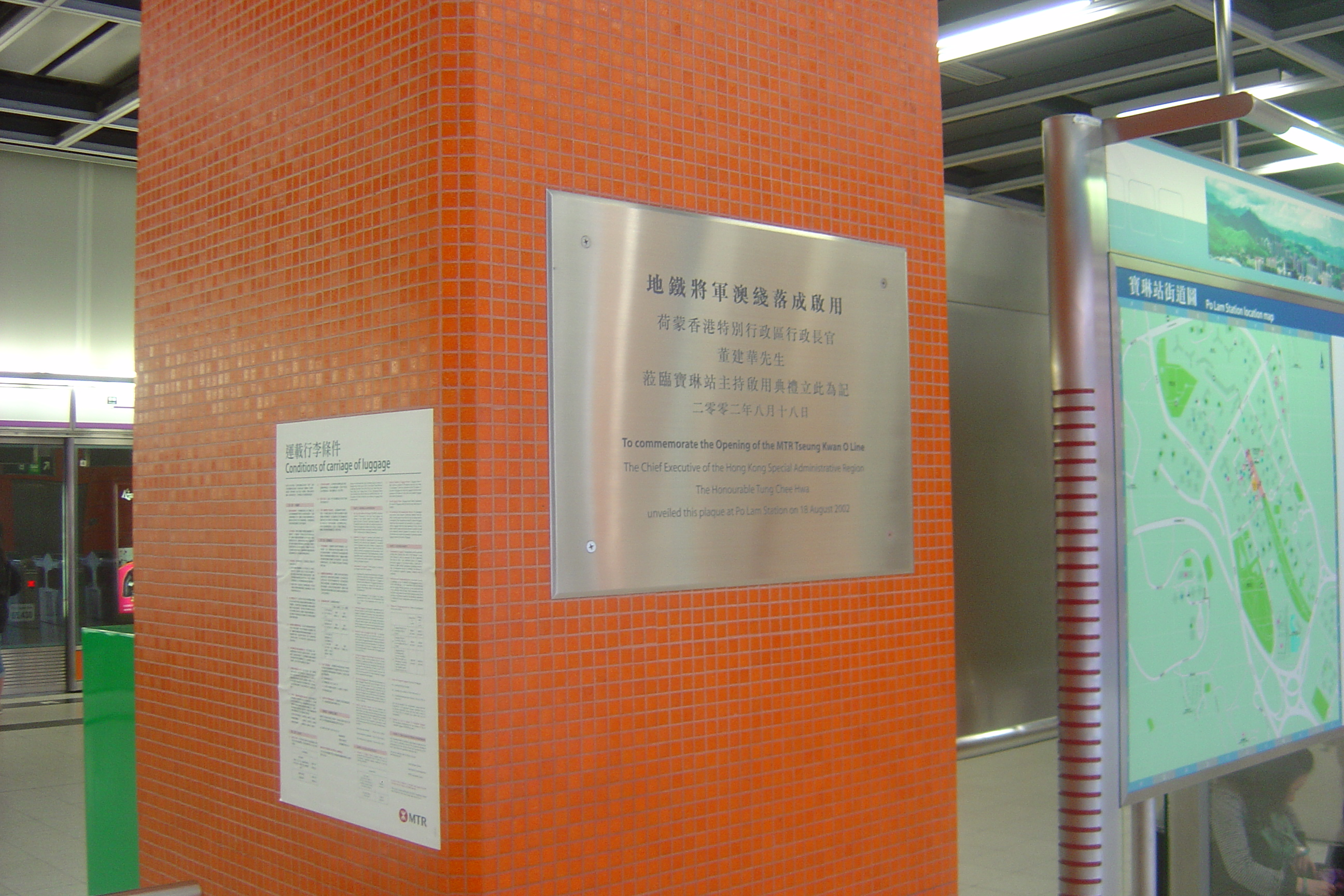
Commemorative plaque for the opening of Tseung Kwan O line is at Po Lam station

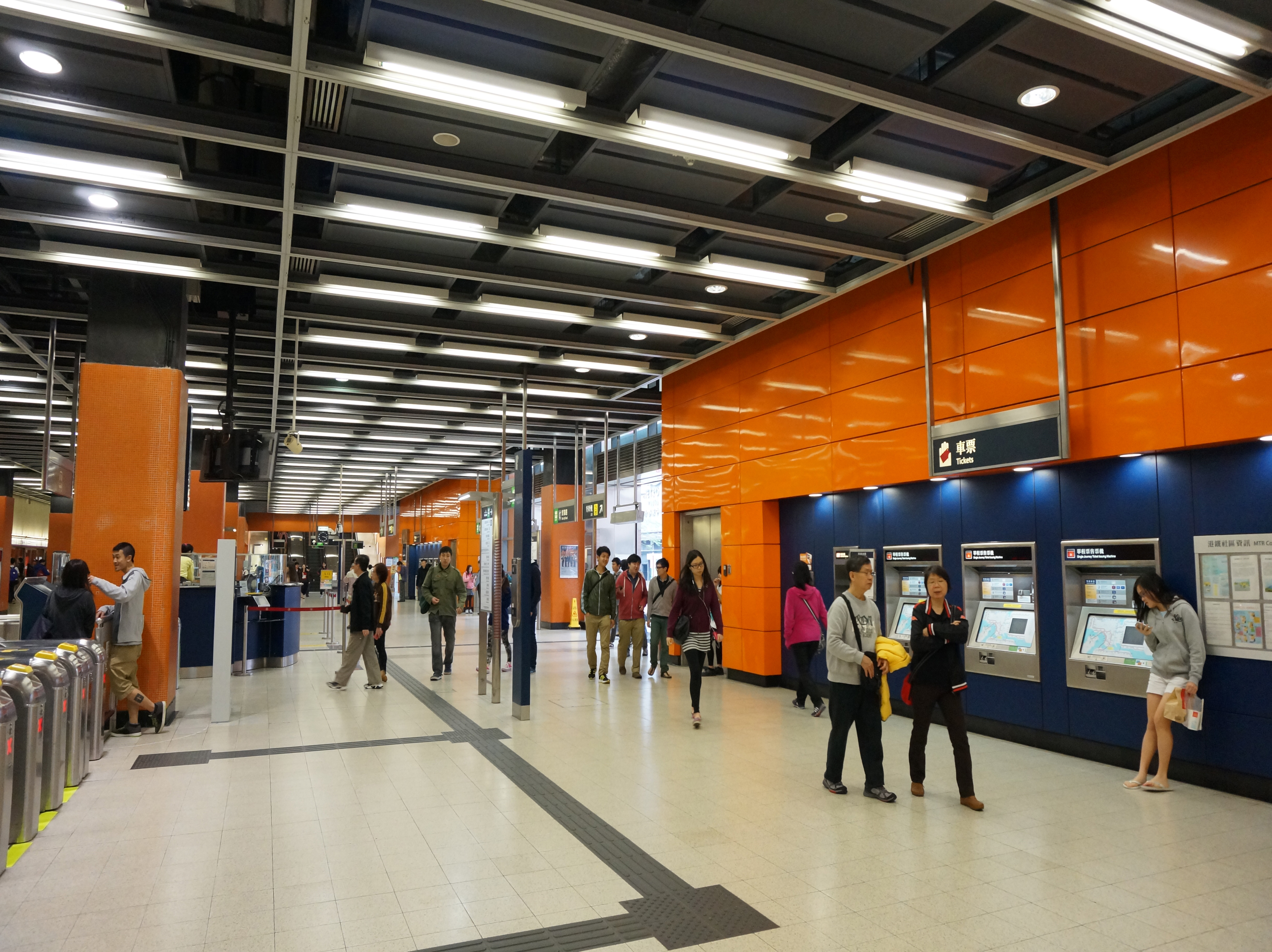
The concourse in 2013

Unlike most MTR stations and unique in the Tseung Kwan O line, the concourse, gates and platform of Po Lam station are on the same level. Tracks ascend from underground to ground level at the southern end of the station, along King Lam Estate. A park is located on top of the tracks to cover them.

=== Platforms ===
There is only one side platform (Platform 1) from which trains depart, in the same direction as they arrive. Trains, as a result, halt on their way from Hang Hau station for another train to depart at the station. Trains also stay here for a shorter period before departing than at other MTR terminals. The single-track design (and the consequent longer train turnback time) limits the maximum train service frequency of the Tseung Kwan O line.

Across from the platform and north of the point where the tracks merge to one, there is a siding that splits from the running line for parking trains. Trains cannot access the platform from the siding, nor can they access the siding from the platform.

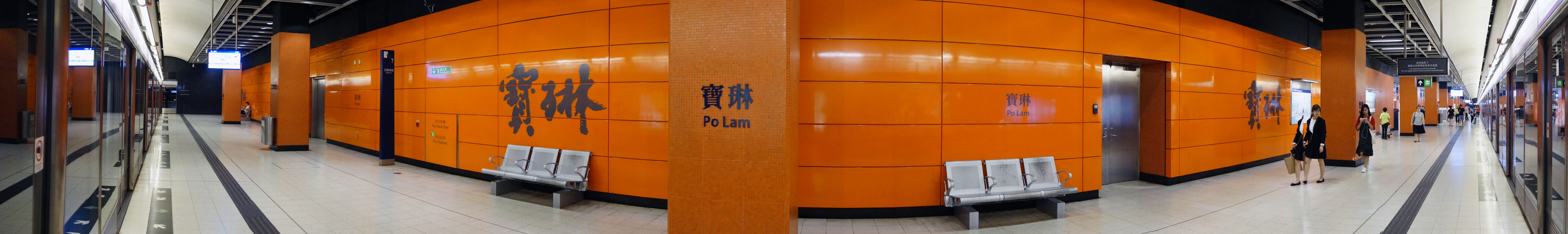
Platform 1 in July 2017

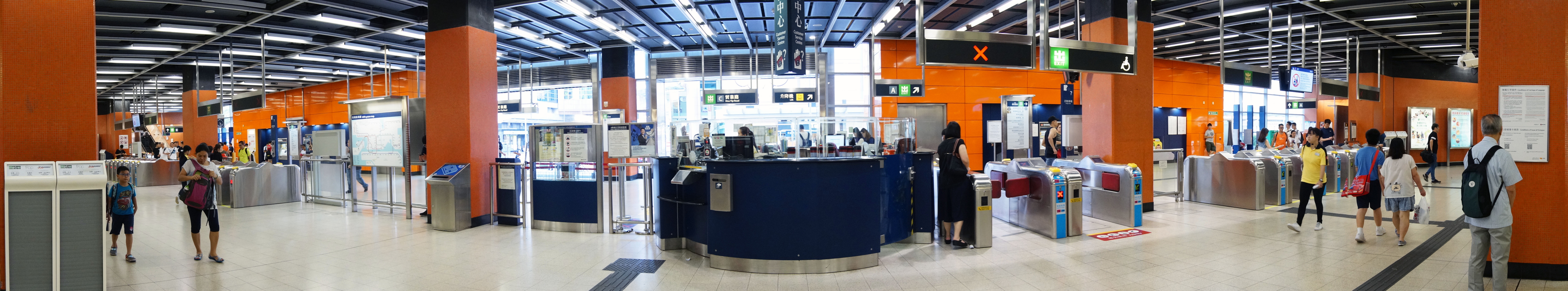
The concourse in August 2017

== Entrances/exits ==
The main exit is on Mau Yip Road, where five pedestrian footbridges link the station to a public transport interchange, shopping malls and residential buildings. There is direct access to Metro City and The Pinnacle from the concourse. Another footbridge crosses Po Fung Road and leads to Po Lam Estate, Yan Ming Court and Verbena Heights.

- A1: Metro City Plaza III
- A2: Metro City Plaza II
- B1: Metro City Plaza II
- B2: Metro City Plaza I
- B3: King Lam Estate
- C: Mau Yip Road
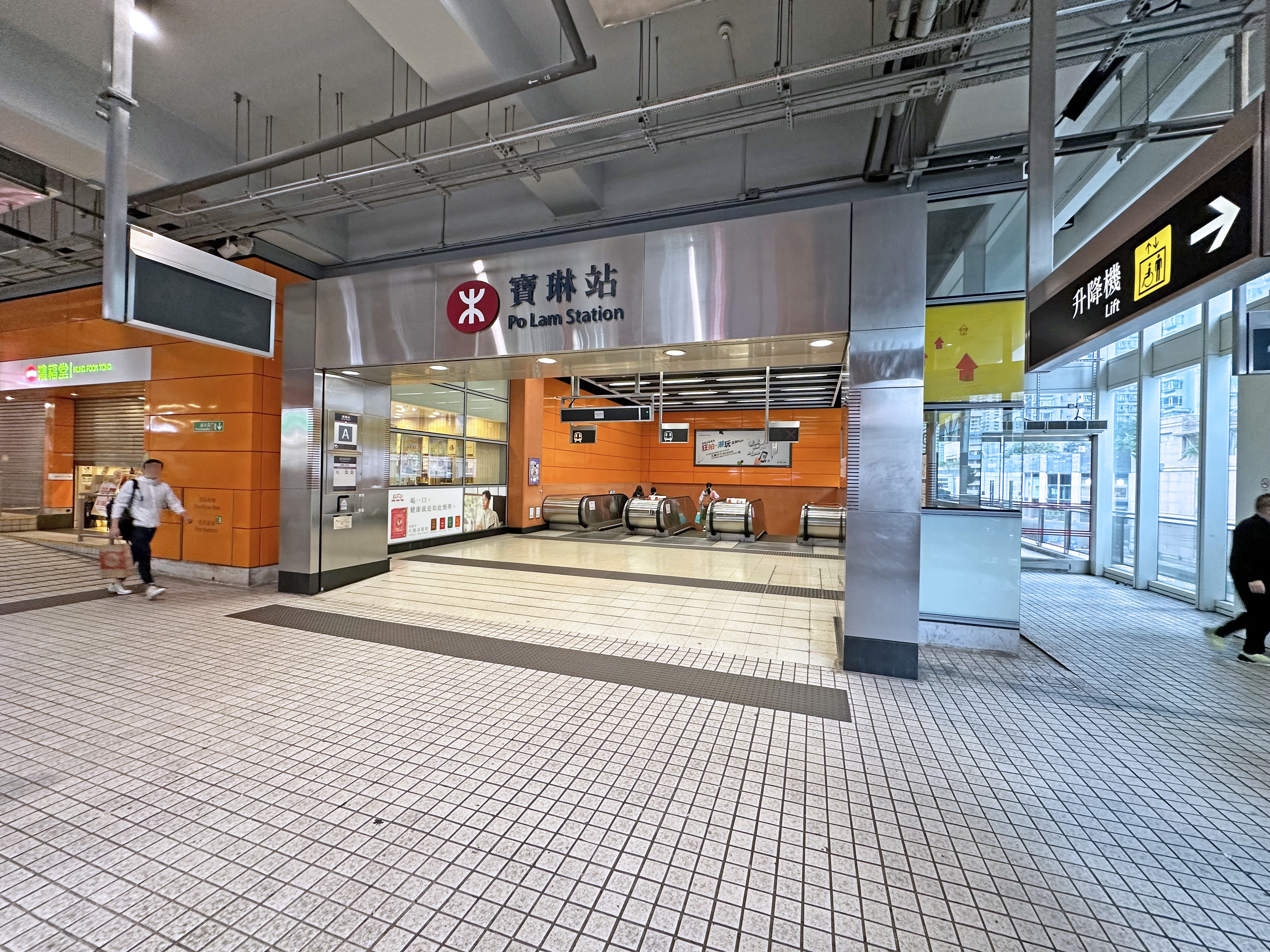
Exit A

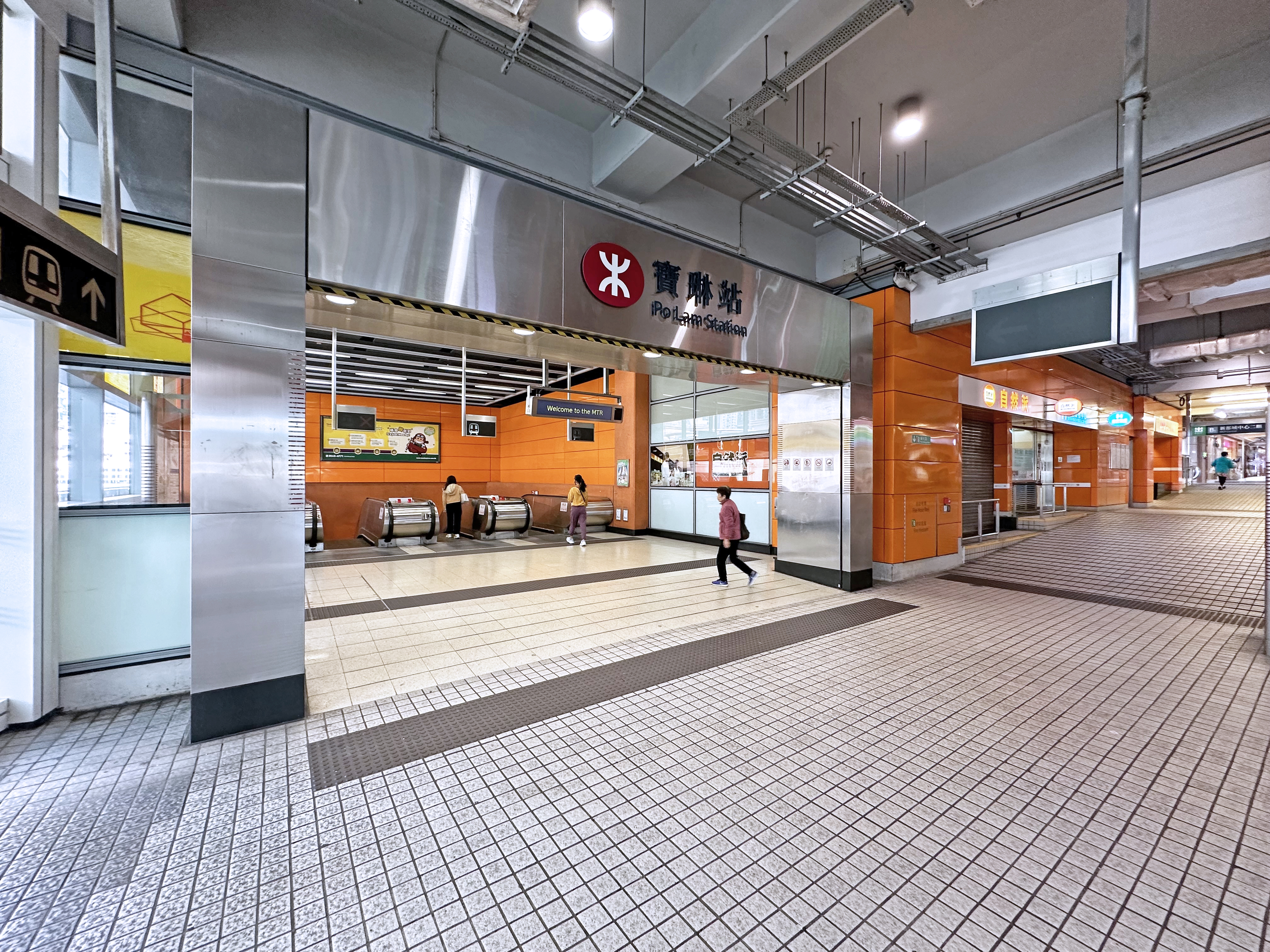
Exit B

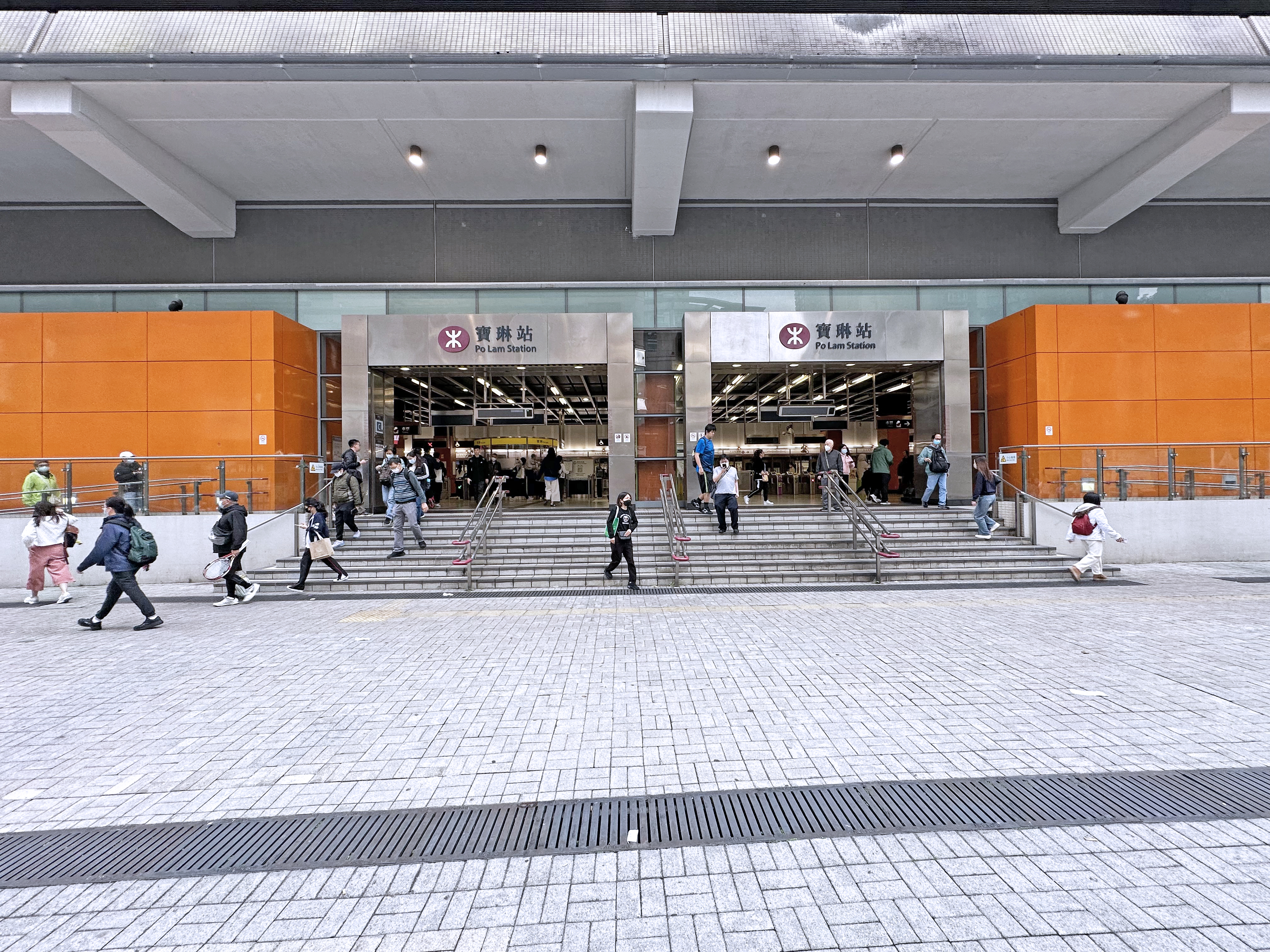
Exit C

== Station artwork ==
Name	Artist	Location	Completion date
City of Towers	Kacey Wong	Entrance A1 & B2	August 2002

== Future development ==
The government proposed in the Railway Development Strategy 2014 that East Kowloon line will connect Po Lam and Diamond Hill stations, passing through Po Tat, Sau Mau Ping, Shun Tin and Choi Wan stations. It will serve as an alternative route to reach Kwun Tong line in case of disruption on the Tseung Kwan O line, and is expected to open in 2025.
