= Shun Lee station =

Proposed MTR station in the Kowloon, Hong Kong

Shun Lee 順利

General information
- Location: Shun Lee; Kwun Tong District, Hong Kong
- System: Proposed MTR rapid transit station
- Operator: MTR Corporation
- Line: East Kowloon line

Other information
- Status: Under planning
- Station code: SHL

Services
Preceding station	MTR	Following station
Proposed
Choi Wan towards Choi Hung East	East Kowloon line	Shun On towards Yau Tong East

Shun Lee (Chinese: 順利; Jyutping: seon^{6} lei^{6}) is a proposed MTR station on the proposed East Kowloon line. It will be located at Shun Lee, Kwun Tong District, Kowloon, Hong Kong. The station is still under planning.
