= Choi Wan station =

Proposed MTR station in the Kowloon, Hong Kong

Choi Wan 彩雲

General information
- Location: Choi Hing Road; Kwun Tong District, Hong Kong
- System: Proposed MTR rapid transit station
- Operator: MTR Corporation
- Line: East Kowloon line

Other information
- Status: Under planning
- Station code: CWA

Services
Preceding station	MTR	Following station
Proposed
Choi Hung East Terminus	East Kowloon line	Shun Lee towards Yau Tong East

Choi Wan (Chinese: 彩雲; Jyutping: coi^{2} wan^{4}) is a proposed MTR station on the proposed East Kowloon line. It is proposed to be located at Choi Hing Road, Kwun Tong District, Kowloon, Hong Kong. The station is still under planning.
