= MTR Rotem EMU =

Model of electric multiple unit operated by the MTR

K-Train Rotem EMU 港鐵市區綫韓製列車/ 港鐵東涌綫韓製列車
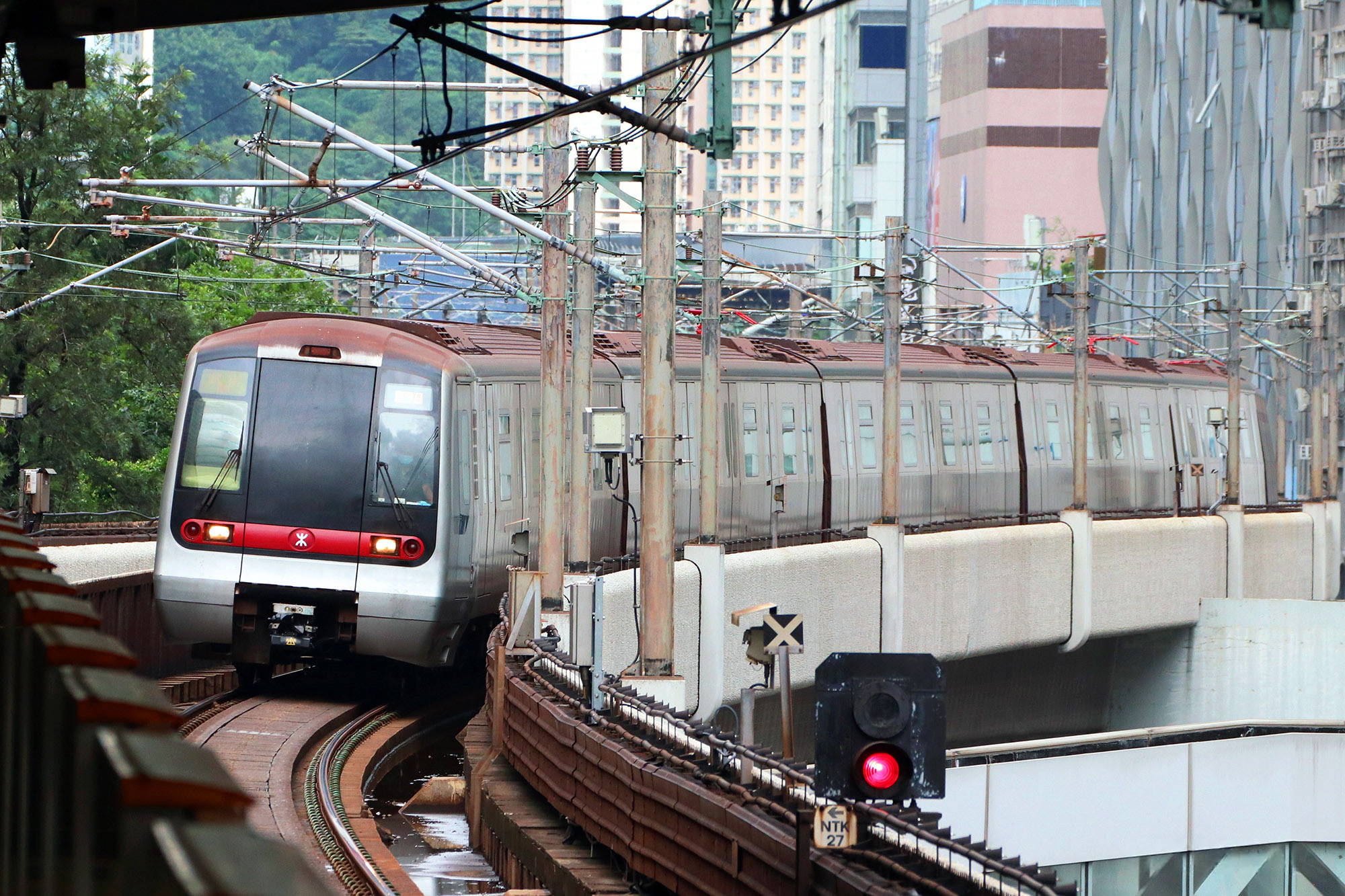
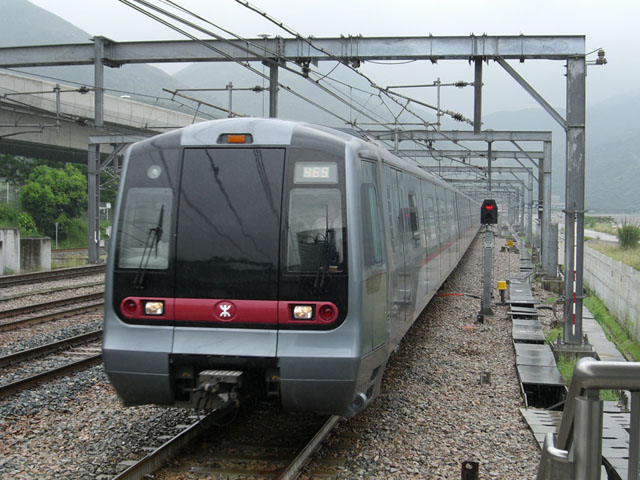
- URL-K Stock on the Kwun Tong line TCL-K-Stock on the Tung Chung line approaching Sunny Bay station

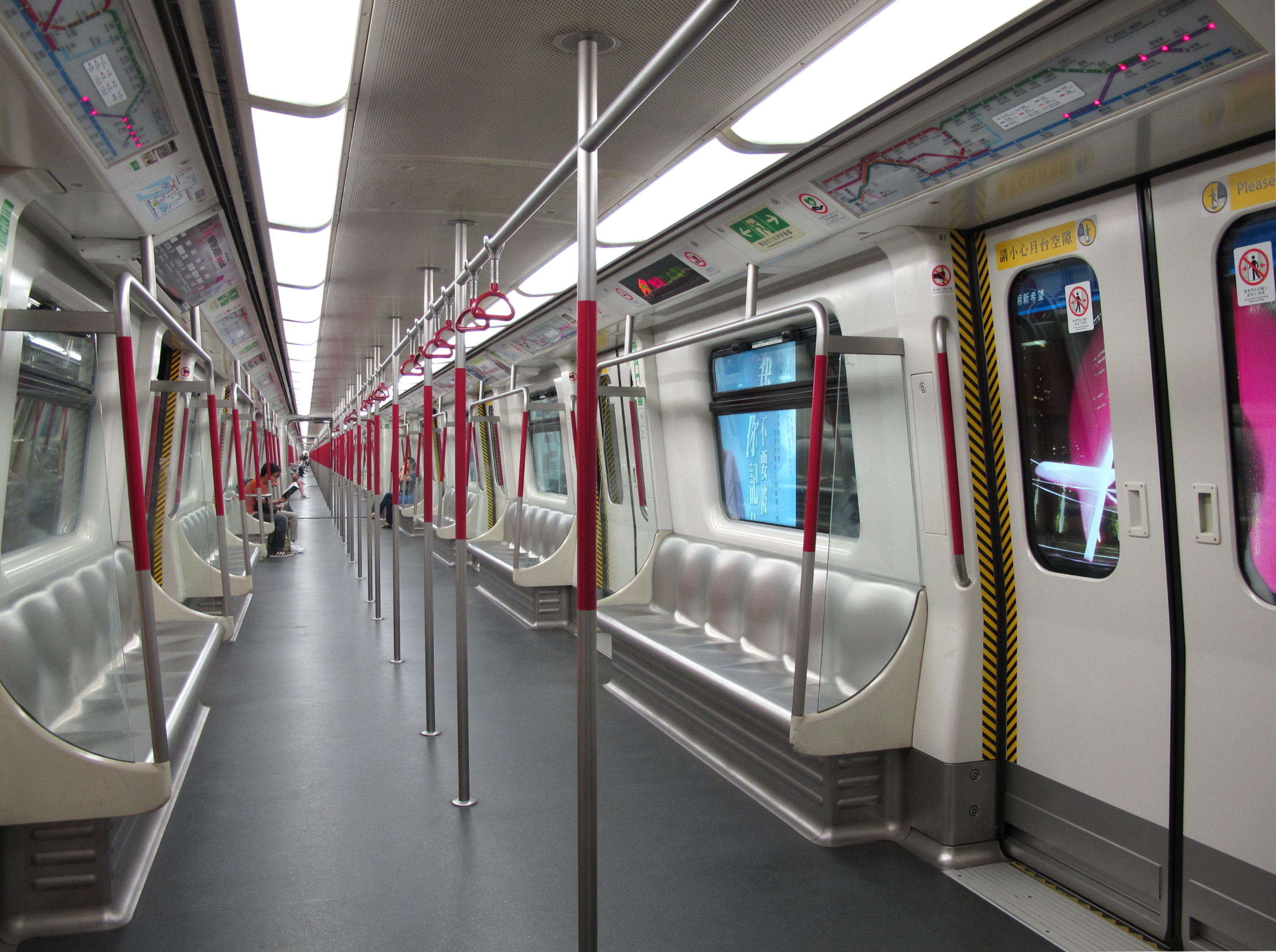
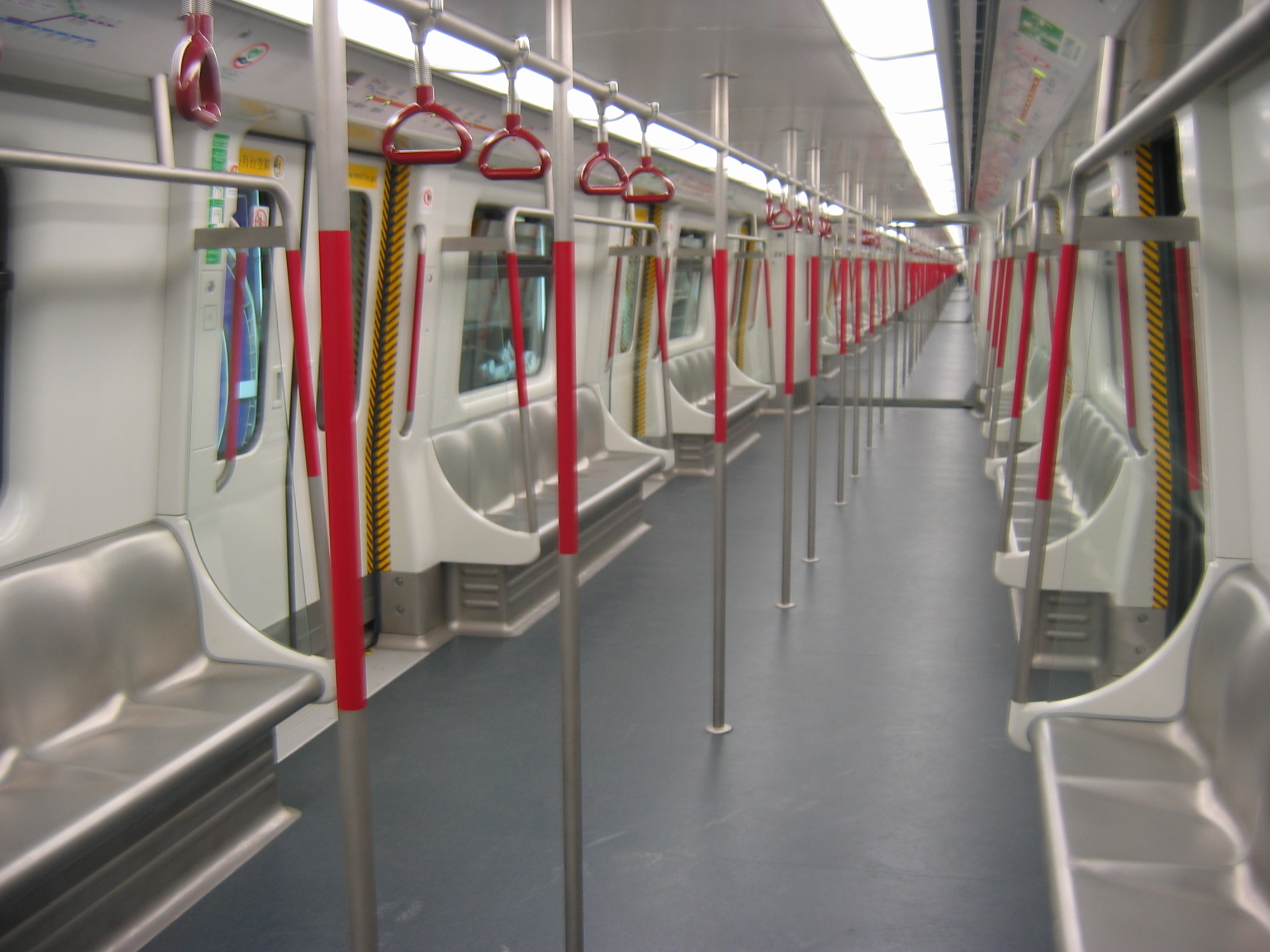
- K-Train interior used on the Tseung Kwan O line K-Train interior used on the Tung Chung line
- In service: Kwun Tong line : 26 April 2002 – 2010; Tseung Kwan O line : 8 April 2010; 16 years ago – present; Tung Chung line : 12 June 2006; 20 years ago – present
- Manufacturers: Hyundai Rotem and Mitsubishi Heavy Industries consortium
- Order nos.: Tseung Kwan O line : TKE-C651; Tung Chung line : TKE-C6522-04E
- Built at: Changwon, South Korea; Mihara, Hiroshima, Japan
- Constructed: 2001–2007
- Entered service: Tseung Kwan O line : 8 April 2010; 16 years ago; Tung Chung line : 12 June 2006; 20 years ago
- Number built: Tseung Kwan O line : 104 cars; Tung Chung line : 32 cars
- Number in service: Tseung Kwan O line : 13 sets; Tung Chung line : 4 sets
- Formation: 8 cars per trainset
- Operator: MTR
- Depots: Tseung Kwan O line: Kowloon Bay depot (2002–2009); Tseung Kwan O depot; Tung Chung line: Siu Ho Wan depot
- Lines served: Tseung Kwan O line; Tung Chung line

Specifications
- Car body construction: Stainless steel
- Train length: Tseung Kwan O line : 183 m (600 ft 5 in); Tung Chung line : 183.6 m (602 ft 4 in)
- Car length: Tung Chung line end cars: 23,788 mm (78 ft 0.5 in); Tseung Kwan O line end cars: 23,230 mm (76 ft 2.6 in); Intermediate cars: 22,000 mm (72 ft 2.1 in)
- Width: 3,118 mm (10 ft 2.8 in)
- Height: 3,698 mm (12 ft 1.6 in) (without pantograph or air conditioner)
- Floor height: Tung Chung line : 1.25 m (49.2 in); Tseung Kwan O line : 1.1 m (43.3 in)
- Platform height: Tung Chung line : 1.25 m (49.2 in); Tseung Kwan O line : 1.1 m (43.3 in)
- Doors: 5 sets of 51 inch wide Sliding Plug doors per side
- Wheel diameter: 860–785 mm (33.9–30.9 in) (new–worn)
- Wheelbase: 2.5 m (8 ft 2 in)
- Maximum speed: Tseung Kwan O line: 90 km/h (56 mph) (design); 80 km/h (50 mph) (service); Tung Chung line: 140 km/h (87 mph) (design); 135 km/h (84 mph) (service)
- Weight: 335t (per train set)
- Traction system: Mitsubishi 2-level IGBT–VVVF: Tung Chung line model number: MAP-214-15VD143
- Traction motors: 24 × Mitsubishi asynchronous 3-phase AC: Tseung Kwan O line : MB-5086-A, 150 kW (201 hp); Tung Chung line : MB-5116-A, 210 kW (281.6 hp)
- Power output: Tseung Kwan O line : 3,600 kW (4,828 hp); Tung Chung line : 5,760 kW (7,724 hp)
- Acceleration: 1 m/s^{2} (3.3 ft/s^{2})
- Deceleration: Service: 0.8–1.35 m/s^{2} (2.6–4.4 ft/s^{2}); Emergency: 1.4 m/s^{2} (4.6 ft/s^{2})
- Electric systems: 1,500 V DC overhead catenary
- Current collection: Pantograph
- UIC classification: 2′2′+Bo′Bo′+Bo′Bo′+Bo′Bo′+Bo′Bo′+Bo′Bo′+Bo′Bo′+2′2′
- Bogies: Tseung Kwan O line : Adtranz MetroStar; Tung Chung line : Bombardier FLEXX Metro 3000
- Braking systems: Knorr-Bremse electropneumatic, regenerative and rheostatic
- Safety systems: ATO and ATP
- Seating: 1,240 passengers(360 seats) (per train set)
- Track gauge: 1,432 mm (4 ft 8 3/8 in)

The Rotem EMU (also known as K-Train/K-Stock) is an electric multiple unit that operates on the MTR rapid transit railway system in Hong Kong. They were jointly built by a consortium consisting of Mitsubishi Heavy Industries of Japan and Hyundai Rotem of South Korea and come in two variants: TKE-C651 was delivered for the Tseung Kwan O line (used on the Kwun Tong line until 2009), and TKE-C6522-04E delivered in 2006 to 2007 for the Tung Chung line. In 2003 and 2004, the urban line trains ran on the Tsuen Wan line, Island line and Tseung Kwan O line.

The K-Stock trains are different from the R-stock trains built by Hyundai Rotem for the East Rail line extension, which were ordered by MTRC on 14 December 2012, as 37 nine-car sets and entered service on the current East Rail line in 2021.

== Details ==
=== Tseung Kwan O line stock ===
The first of the 104 TKE-C651 cars entered service on 26 April 2002. Originally, these trains were designated to serve on the Tseung Kwan O line, but incompatible signalling apparatus installed in the new trains (running mode rather than the traditional automatic control system found in the M-stock) meant that all of the K-stock trains were initially unable to serve on the Tseung Kwan O line. As an alternative, all of those prototypes were ordered to serve on the Kwun Tong line. They have since been moved to the Tseung Kwan O line with the extension to LOHAS Park in 2009 which made the Kwun Tong line only use the M-Train. Since the location of motor and trailer cars are different from the older M-Train, it does not have any cars similar to D cars in M-Train.

The K-Stock trains came under criticism when they were first put into service due to delays and door safety issues. Along with other service reliability issues, there have been incidents where passengers have been injured by its doors, leading to the MTRCL "minimising the number of Korean trains for passenger service until a higher reliability of the systems concerned is achieved".

Tseung Kwan O line cars
car type	driver cab	motor	pantograph	auto- coupler	length (mm)	seat	wheelchair space	amount
A car	✓	✗	✗	✓	23230	45	1	26
B car	✗	✓	✗	✗	22000	45	1	39
C car	✗	✓	✓	✓	22000	45	1	39

The configuration of a TKL K Stock train is (Eastbound) A-C-B-B-C-B-C-A (Westbound). Its maximum speed is 90 km/h (56 mph) but with service limits to 80 km/h (50 mph), with a maximum starting acceleration of 1.3 m/s^{2} (4.27 ft/s^{2}) (limited to 1 m/s^{2} (3.28 ft/s^{2}) in ATO), maximum service deceleration rate of 1.35 m/s^{2} (4.43 ft/s^{2}) and emergency deceleration of 1.4 m/s^{2} (4.59 ft/s^{2}). This modern train is equipped with a modern 2-level IGBT–VVVF inverter from Mitsubishi Electric.

=== Tung Chung line stock ===
The first TKE-C6522-04E train came into service for MTR on 12 June 2006 to 26 February 2007. Originally MTRC wanted to buy new additional trains for the Tung Chung line when the North Island line project began. MTR anticipated that the opening of the Disneyland Resort and Ngong Ping 360 would have an increase in passenger demand and therefore ordered four new trains for the Tung Chung line. The time frame from order to completion is short in comparison to other stock, however; the four new trains can only be made to be identical to existing Tseung Kwan O line K-Stock.

Tung Chung line cars
car type	driver cab	motor	pantograph	auto- coupler	length (mm)	seat	wheelchair space	amount
V car	✓	✗	✗	✓	23788	42	2	8
W / X car	✗	✓	✗	✗	22000	48	0	12
Y / Z car	✗	✓	✓	✓	22000	48	0	12

The configuration of a TCL K-Stock train is (Westbound) V-Z-X-Y-W-X-Z-V (Eastbound). Its maximum speed is 140 km/h (87 mph) but with service limits to 135 km/h (84 mph), with a maximum starting acceleration and service deceleration rate of 1 m/s^{2} (3.28 ft/s^{2}), and emergency deceleration of 1.4 m/s^{2} (4.59 ft/s^{2}). This advanced train is equipped with a modern 2-level IGBT–VVVF inverter (model number: MAP-214-15VD143) from Mitsubishi Electric.

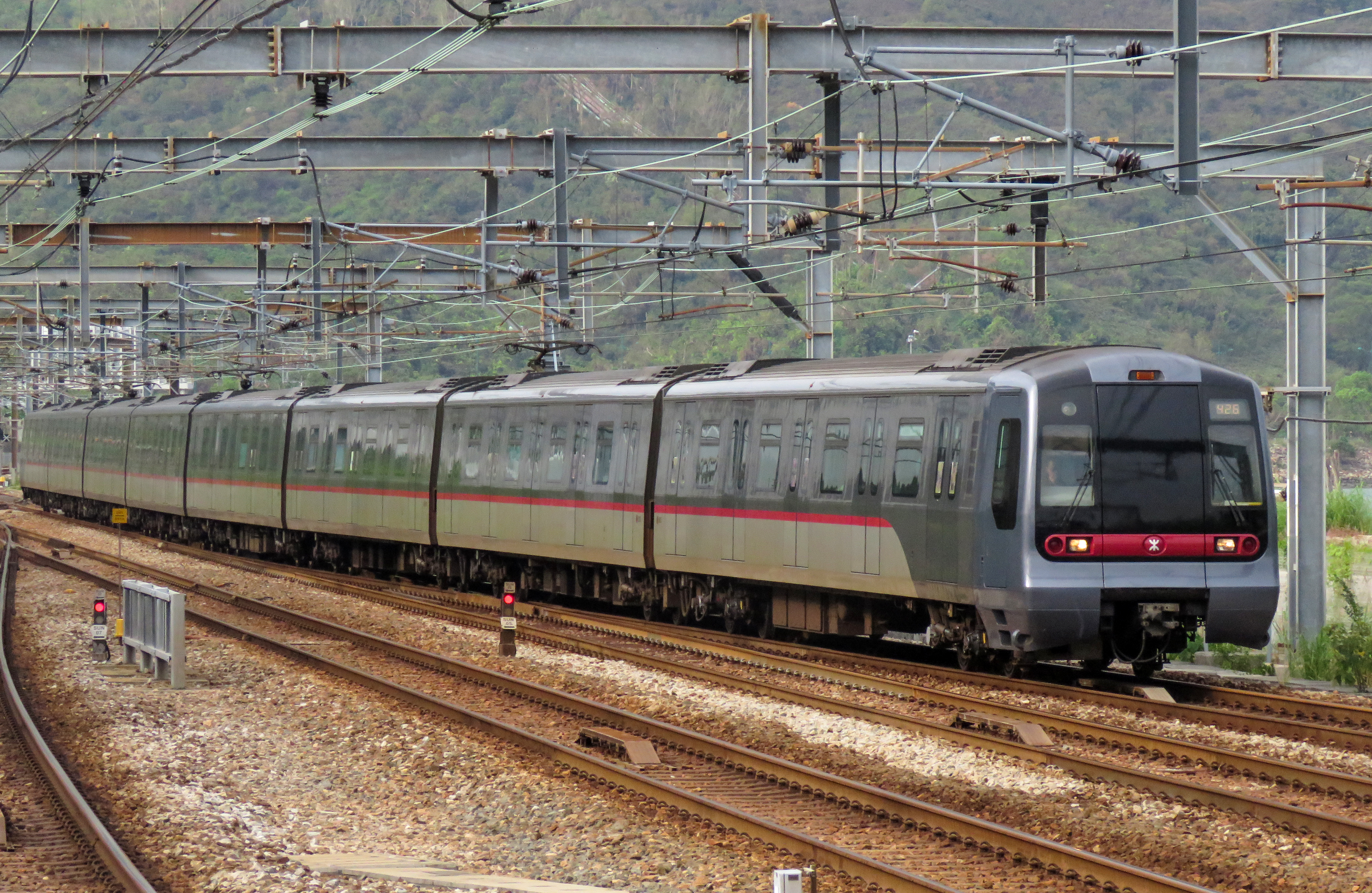
Tung Chung line train entering Sunny Bay station

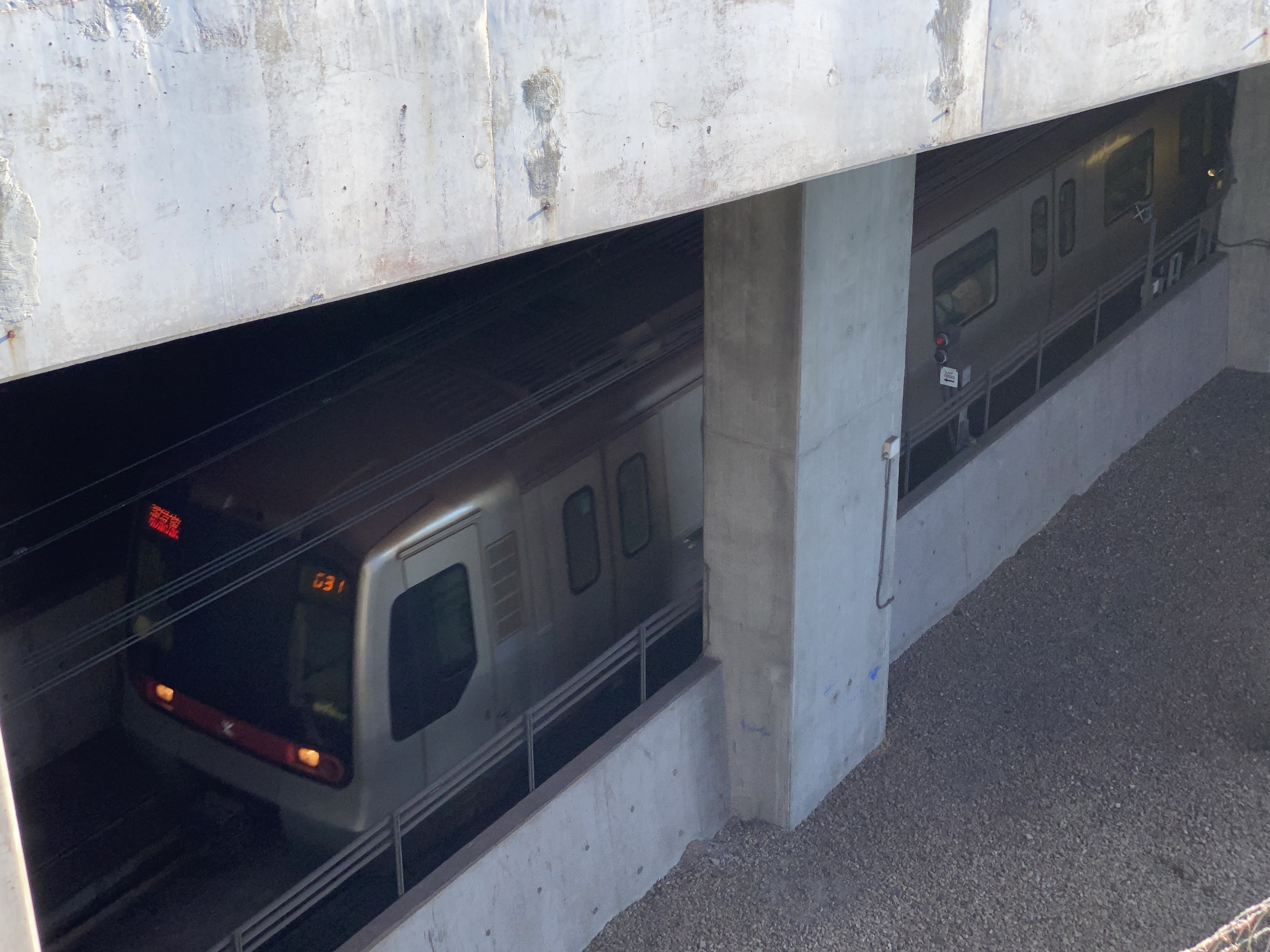
Train entering LOHAS Park station of Tseung Kwan O

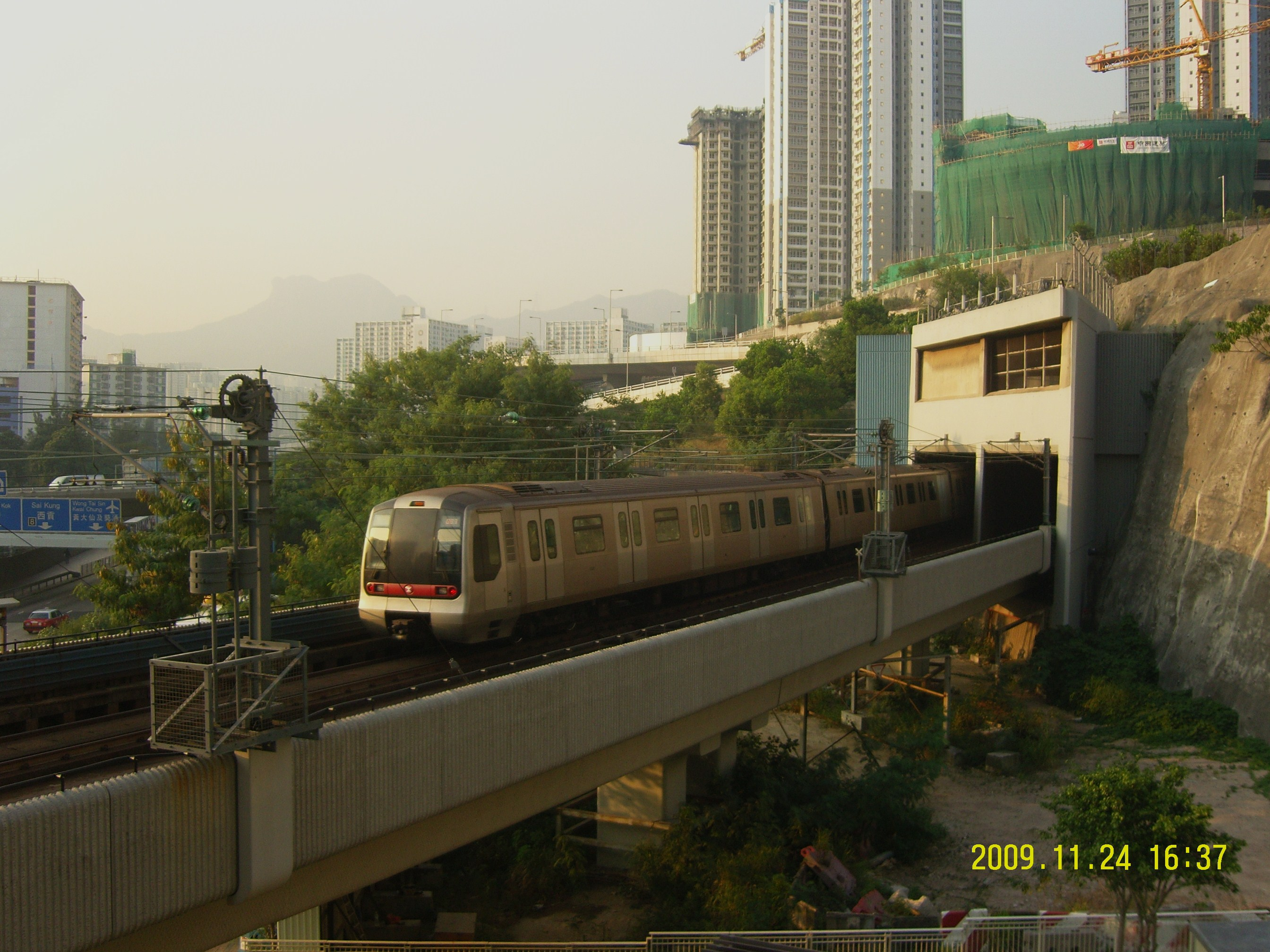
Train Entering the tunnel, November 2009

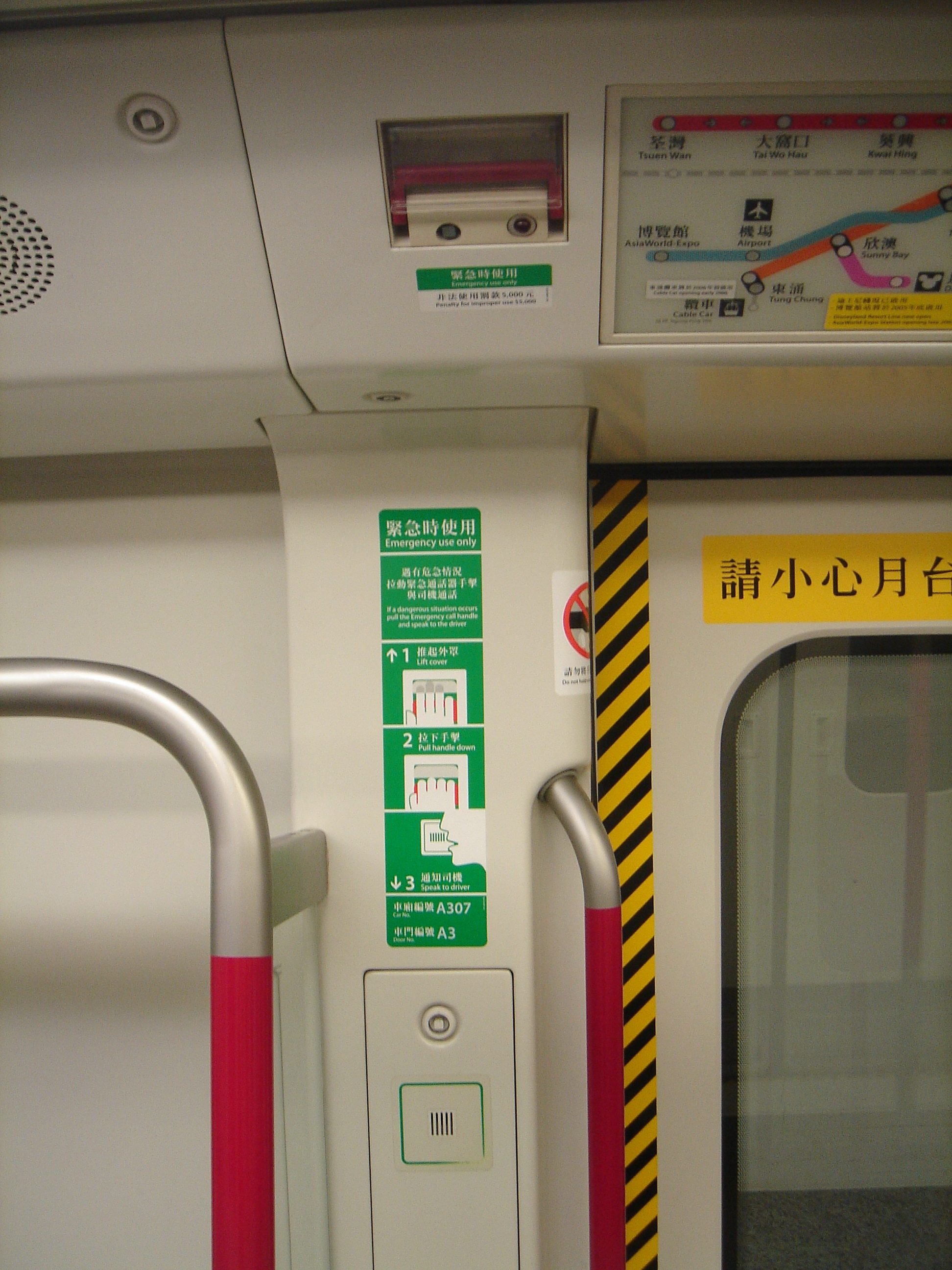
Emergency driver communications, A307, November 2005

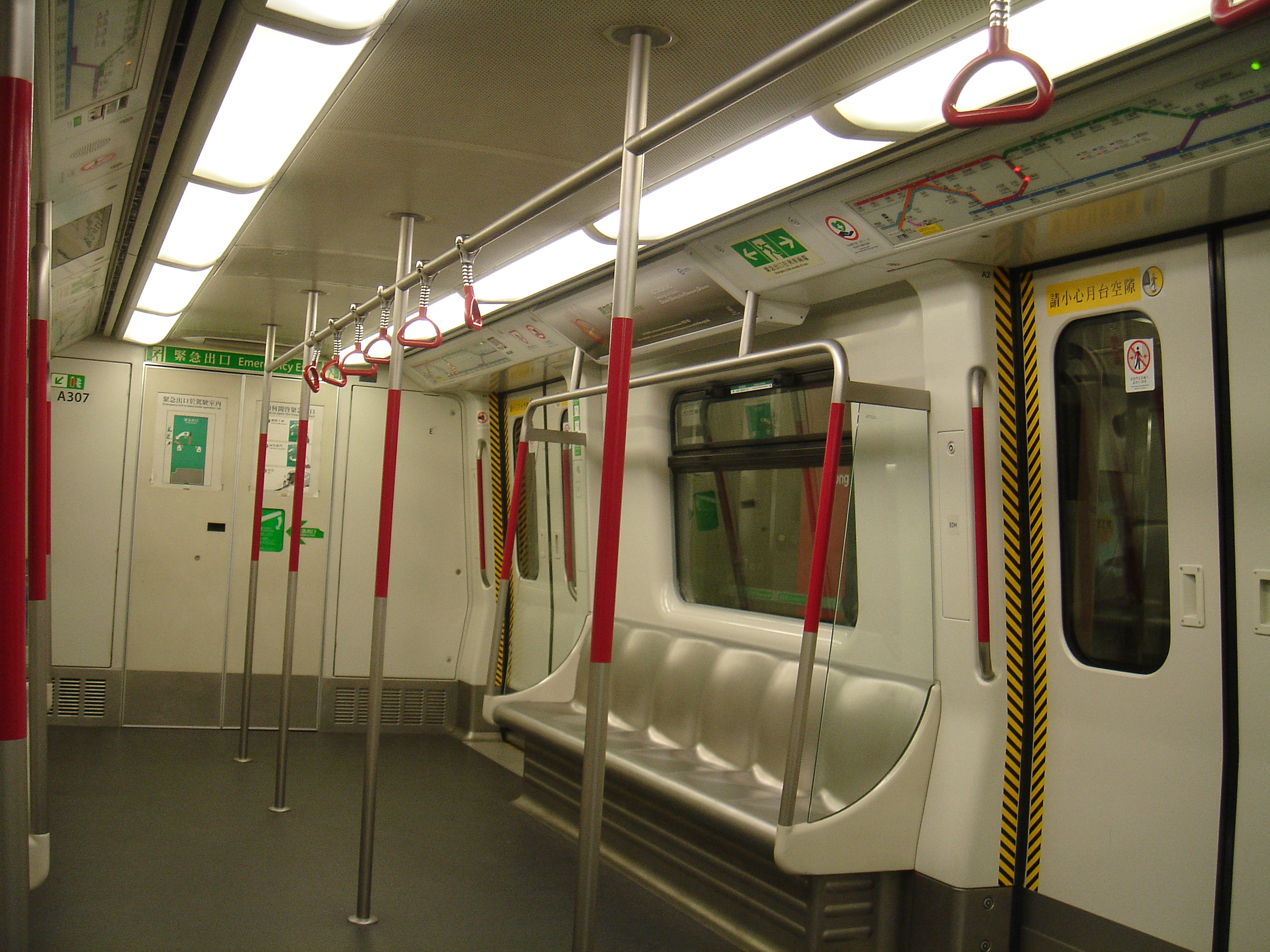
Train front compartment

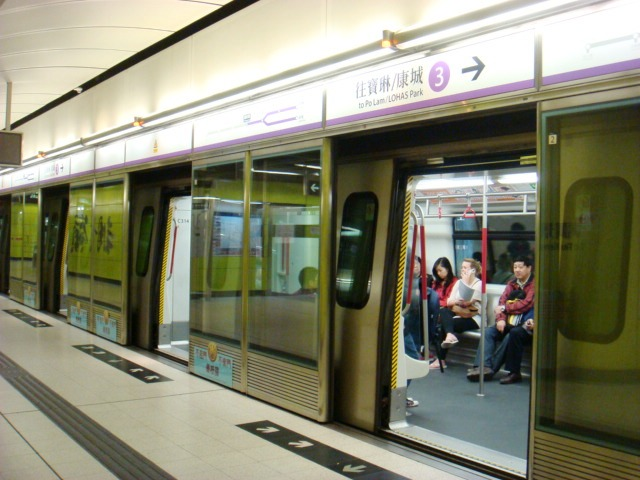
Train at Tiu Keng Leng station

== Overseas export ==
A variant of the MTR K-Stock EMU was selected as Phase I rolling stock for the Delhi Metro in India. They have a very similar exterior appearance, as they were also designed by Mitsubishi/Rotem, but were built by BEML through a technology transfer arrangement.

== In popular culture ==
The train on the Tseung Kwan O line, appears in the film, Blackhat.
