= M2K =

M2K may refer to:

- Mew2King, a professional Super Smash Bros. player
- M2K Mini Tour, a mini tour by heavy metal band Metallica
- MAP kinase kinase (M2K)
- M2K (postal code), see List of postal codes of Canada: M
- Dassault Mirage 2000, French fourth-generation jet fighter

== See also ==
- MK2 (disambiguation)
- MKK (disambiguation)
- MMK (disambiguation)
- MK (disambiguation)
