= MKKK =

MKKK may refer to:

- MAP kinase kinase kinase (MKKK)
- Manchuria Aviation Company (MKKK, Japanese: 滿洲航空株式會社, romanized: Manshū Kōkū Kabushiki-gaisha), the Japanese mandated Manchurian flag carrier airline
- Zhastar Stadium (Kazakh: MKKK), Aktau, Kazakhstan

== See also ==
- M3K (disambiguation)
- MK3 (disambiguation)
- MK (disambiguation)
- MKK (disambiguation)
