= 2019 Prince Edward station attack =

Major incident of the 2019–2020 Hong Kong protests

- Part of 2019–2020 Hong Kong protests
- Hong Kong police storm Prince Edward station and attack passengers on 31 August 2019.
- Date: 31 August 2019; 7 years ago (Hong Kong Time UTC+8)
- Location: Prince Edward station, Mong Kok, Kowloon
- Result: (See Aftermath section)

Parties
| Anti-extradition bill demonstrators and passengers | Hong Kong Police Force | Pro-government demonstrators |

Casualties
- Injuries: At least 10 (people sent to hospital)
- Arrested: 65 (as of 1 November, all protestors or passengers)
- Charged: 2 (as of 1 November)
- Location within Hong Kong

2019 Prince Edward station attack
- Chinese: 831太子站事件
Transcriptions
Standard Mandarin
- Hanyu Pinyin: 831 Tàizǐ Zhàn Shìjiàn
Yue: Cantonese
- Jyutping: 831 taai3 zi2 zaam6 si6 gin6*2

The 2019 Prince Edward station attack, also known as the 31 August Prince Edward station incident (Chinese: 831太子站事件), was an incident in which Hong Kong police indiscriminately attacked passengers while arresting protesters who were returning home via Prince Edward station, on the night of 31 August 2019, after a protest was held that same day. The event was described as the police version of the 2019 Yuen Long attack, and the police have been criticised as acting like terrorists. Rumours have been circulated that several protesters were beaten to death at the station, but the police have rejected allegations. However, for over a year on the last day of each month, pro-democracy supporters continued to leave white flowers and bowed as a sign of mourning, until they were stopped by more stringent enforcement of the national security law by police.

The attack is known in Hong Kong as the 831 incident, after the date 31 August.

== Timeline ==
According to several news reports, some protesters conducted flash mobbing on MTR lines, damaging Mong Kok MTR station. They clashed with counter-demonstrators in one of the cabins of the Kwun Tong line train which was heading towards Tiu Keng Leng, as well as on the platform. The counter-demonstrators were armed with weapons including hammers and box cutters.

Videos showed the police Raptor Squads arriving at Prince Edward station, clubbing and pepper-spraying travellers without arresting them. They also conducted arrests of others who were on the platform and on stationary trains on the Kwun Tong line.

According to one passenger of the Central-bound train on the Tsuen Wan line, not all of the passengers in his cabin were protesters; other witnesses also accused the police of attacking those passengers without reason.

The train then went to Yau Ma Tei station, where the injured passengers were evacuated by medics; bloodied bandages, tissues and umbrellas littered the scene. The station was closed soon afterwards by the police, even journalists and paramedics were not allowed to enter. One paramedic reportedly waved a banner with the words "Hindering aid operations is violating International humanitarian law".

After the raid, seven people were sent to hospital. An additional three people from the initial Kwun Tong line conflict had been sent to the hospital via Yau Ma Tei station, before the arrival of the officers of the Hong Kong Fire Services Department. The fire department also admitted that the police who arrived before them had temporarily blocked the access of the platforms, delaying the rescue. It was reported that it took the injured over 2.5 hours to reach the hospital.

A total of 65 people were arrested as of 1 November for involvement in the incident. The police accused the suspects of "unauthorised assembly," "criminal damage," and "obstruction of a police officer in the execution of his duty". However, it was reported that a counter-demonstrator armed with a hammer was not among those arrested, despite witness' claims that he had injured several people.

According to the police, two arrested suspects, aged 33 and 13, were formally charged for "possession of offensive or lethal weapons". Their cases were mentioned in the court for the first time on 2 September. The second mention of their cases were queued in November. 62 people were under bail as of 1 November. Another teen, aged 15, was released in October without charges. The court refused his application for a protective order.

Passengers attacked by the police

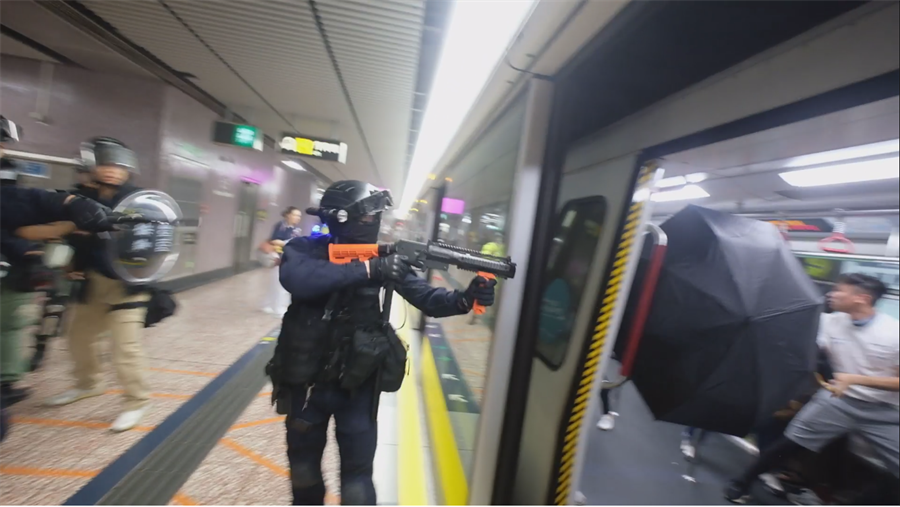
Police aiming at passengers with a sponge grenade gun

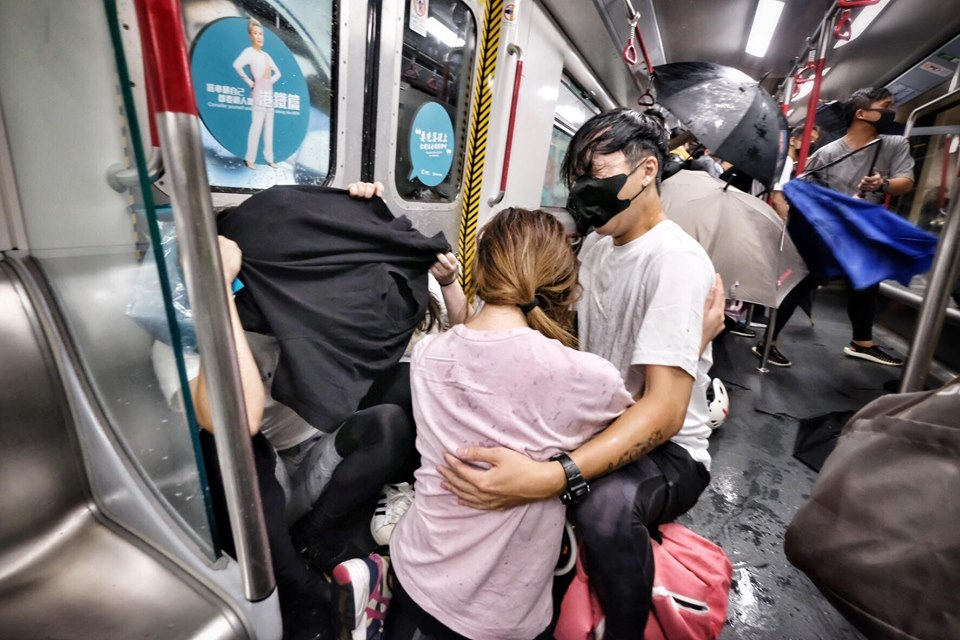
Passengers during the attack

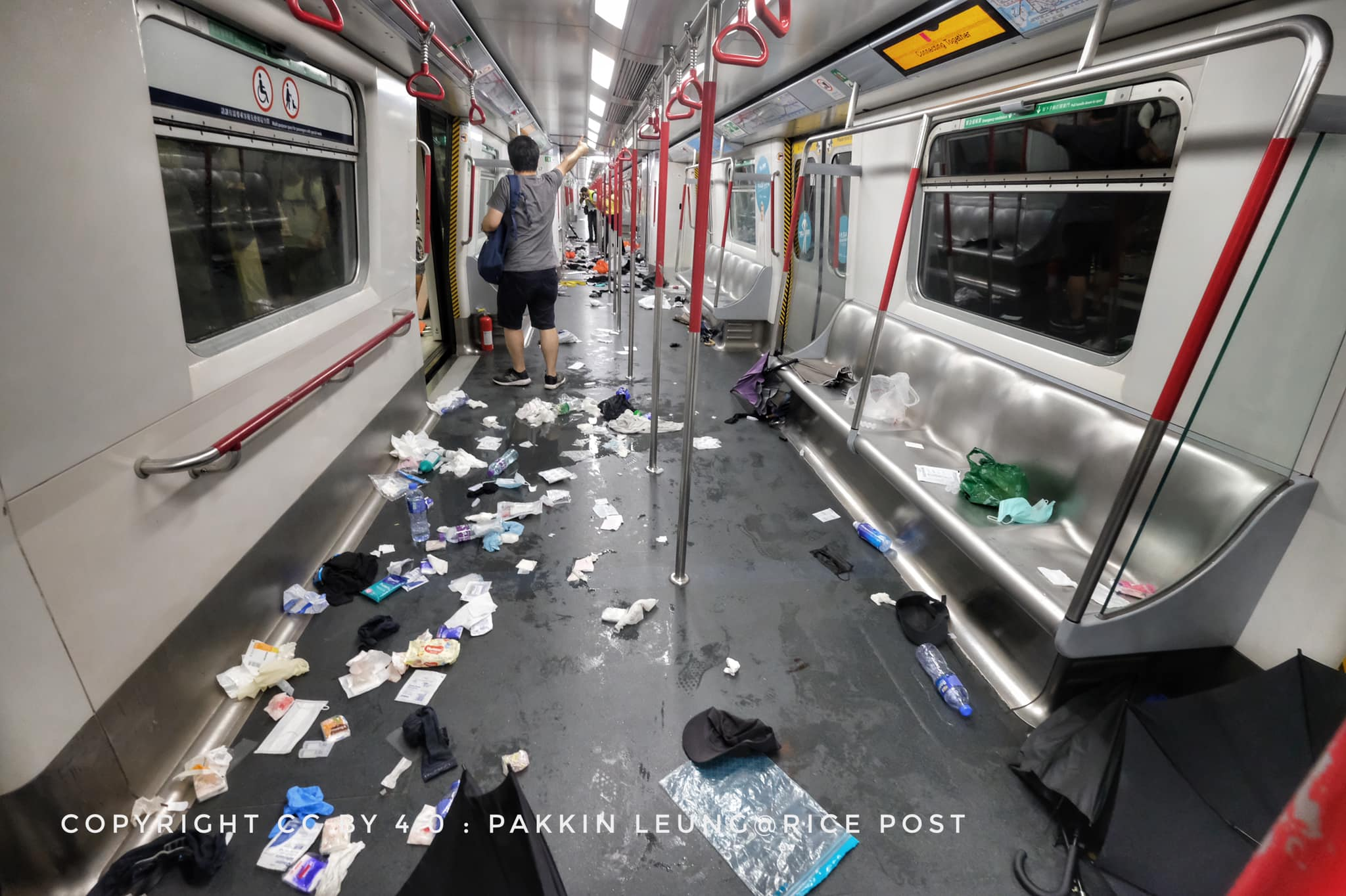
Train interior after the police attack

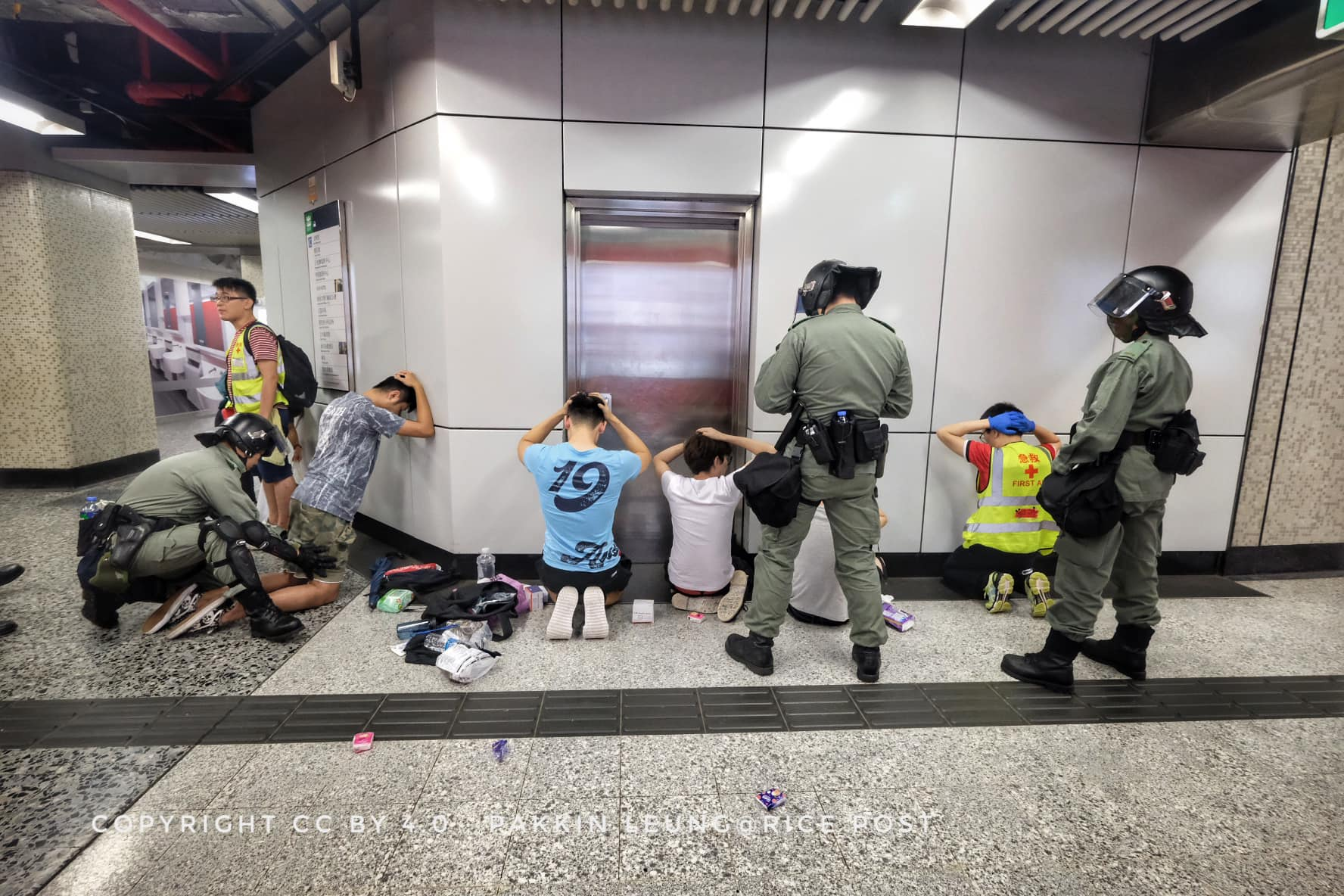
Passengers surrendering to riot police

== Aftermath ==
The Hong Kong Fire Services Department's preliminary initial records had changed from 10 to 7 injured.

On 6 September 2019, several sit-in protests were reported in September wherein protesters demanded MTR to release the footage of the closed-circuit television and were "calling on police to apologise for excessive violence". One of the exits of the MTR station became an unofficial memorial wall with flowers and messages. Despite attempts to destroy the memorial by other residents, flowers and messages were re-built by the protesters.

On 31 October, another protest was held near the station to mark the two month commemoration of the incident. However, the protest, which did not have a permit from the police, resulted in a clash between protesters and the police, with at least three people injured and least one protester arrested. It was also reported that the protesters had vandalised traffic lights and the exits of Mong Kok MTR station, as well as starting a fire on nearby Nathan Road.

One of the teens who was injured by the police filed a civil lawsuit against the Hong Kong Police Force, alleging that the attacks against him constituted assault and he was therefore entitled to damages.

On 10 November 2021, a male student of the Hong Kong Academy of Performing Arts pleaded guilty at the District Court to the rioting charges of damaging station property, and threatening passers-by with a cane. Justice Douglas Yau said that Wan was a "frontline offender" and "wantonly vandalised" the station's control room. The starting point for sentencing was four years. With consideration of Wan's guilty plea, the sentence handed out was 40 months.

== Reactions ==
Critics also made sarcastic comments about the police, claiming they were blatantly lying. During the press meeting, the police claimed they were able to distinguish innocent citizens from their arrest targets. They claimed there were "undercover violent protesters" that had changed clothes to blend in, and denied attacking people indiscriminately.

Amnesty International Hong Kong called for an investigation into the police conduct after the Special Tactical Squad stormed Prince Edward station and beat and pepper-sprayed the passengers inside.

The Hong Kong Bar Association accused the police of abusing its power, claiming "Video footage from the Prince Edward MTR station last Saturday night show riot police launching indiscriminate attacks, without any apparent lawful excuse, and using pepper spray on passengers inside a train compartment or hitting them with batons, especially since the officers in question left the train carriage afterwards without making any arrests".

Both the Hong Kong Public Opinion Research Institute (PORI; a successor of HKU Public Opinion Programme) and CUHK Centre for Communication and Public Opinion Survey made opinion polls for the protest and incidents. In the CUHK's fifth survey for the whole protest, 52% of interviewees believe the rumour that the police had killed citizens during the 31 August raid in the MTR station. In PORI's survey, conducted in October, 48% of interviewees believe the rumour. Critics urged the government to establish an Independent Commission of Inquiry, by invoking the Commissions of Inquiry Ordinance, to respond to the situation.

A day before the second anniversary of the incident, a local reporter said he had received mail containing a large razor blade and an anonymous message that he should keep quiet about 831 to protect his family.

For more than a year after the incident, pro-democracy supporters came to the station on the last day of each month to mourn the fatalities they believed had occurred during the attack. More stringent enforcement of the national security law by Hong Kong police ended this. A man holding flowers was taken away on the fifth anniversary of the protests in 2024 after bowing.

== See also ==
- Controversies of the Hong Kong Police Force
- 2019 Yuen Long attack
- 2019 November Shooting Incident in Sai Wai Ho
