= M3K =

M3K may refer to:

- M3K (postal code), Toronto, Ontario, Canada; see List of postal codes of Canada: M
- MAP kinase kinase kinase (M3K)
- M3K (pro-wrestlers), a Japanese pro-wrestling stable of Masaaki Mochizuki, Mochizuki Jr, Susumu Mochizuki, and, Yasushi Kanda, on the Dragongate wrestling promotion tour; wrestling in 2002 and 2023; see List of Dragon Gate personnel
- M3K (amphibious military truck), a variant of the M3 Amphibious Rig bridging vehicle

== See also ==
- MK (disambiguation)
- MK3 (disambiguation)
- mmmk
- MKKK (disambiguation)
- MEK (disambiguation)
