= Mortal Kombat 3 (disambiguation) =

Mortal Kombat 3 may refer to:

- Mortal Kombat 3, a 1995 video game in the Mortal Kombat franchise, the third main-line game in the series.
- Ultimate Mortal Kombat 3, an updated version of the 1995 video game
- Mortal Kombat III (film), an unmade cancelled third film in the 1990s Mortal Kombat film series based on the video game franchise.
- Mortal Kombat III (film), a contracted proposed film not yet in development in the 2020s Mortal Kombat film series based on the videogame franchise, a planned sequel to the film Mortal Kombat II (film)
- Mortal Kombat volume 3 or issue 3, several different books; see List of Mortal Kombat media

== See also ==
- Mortal Kombat Trilogy (videogame), a 1996 videogame in the Mortal Kombat franchise, combining MK3 with remade versions of the MK1 and MK2 games using the MK3 engine, in a combined campaign and story mode.
- MK3 (disambiguation)
