= MMK =

MMK may refer to:

- M. M. Kaye, British writer
- Maalaala Mo Kaya, a drama anthology program in the Philippines
- Magnitogorsk Iron and Steel Works,
- Makkal Manadu Katchi or Tamizhaga Murpokku Makkal Katchi (TMMK), a regional political party in Tamil Nadu, India
- Manithaneya Makkal Katchi, a regional political party by TMMK
- Mayr-Melnhof Karton, a manufacturer in the paper and packaging industry in Austria
- Mūlamadhyamakakārikā, a foundational text of the Buddhist Madhyamaka school, by Nagarjuna
- Museum für Moderne Kunst, art museum in Frankfurt, Germany
- Moscow Kremlin Museums in Moscow
- Smt. M.M.K College of Commerce & Economics, a college in Mumbai, Maharashtra, India
- FAA code for Meriden Markham Municipal Airport
- IATA code for Murmansk Airport
- Station code for Madurantakam railway station, Chengalpattu, Tamil Nadu, India
- Myanmar kyat, the currency of Myanmar, by ISO 4217 code

== See also ==
- M2K (disambiguation)
- MK (disambiguation)
