= MK2 =

MK2 may refer to:

- Mark II (disambiguation), a second version of a product, frequently military hardware. "Mark", meaning "model" or "variant"

== Military ==
- Mk 2 grenade, a hand grenade used by the United States military starting in World War II
- Marte Mk2, a radar-guided helicopter and ship-launched short/medium-range anti-ship missile weapon system developed by Oto Melara and used by the Italian Navy

== Vehicles ==
- Volkswagen Polo, Volkswagen Jetta, and Volkswagen Golf, are automobiles produced in the 1980s and 1990s
- British Railways Mark 2, a type of railway carriage
- The Jaguar Mark 2 is a medium-sized saloon car built from 1959 to 1967 by the Jaguar company in Coventry, England

== Mortal Kombat ==
- Mortal Kombat II, an arcade fighting video game first released in 1993, sequel to the original Mortal Kombat game
- Mortal Kombat Annihilation, a 1997 martial arts action movie based on the Mortal Kombat franchise, the second film in the 1990s Mortal Kombat film series
- Mortal Kombat II (film), a 2026 film based on the Mortal Kombat franchise, the second film in the 2020s Mortal Kombat film series

== Other video games ==
- Hyperdimension Neptunia Mk2, a Japanese role-playing video game
- Mario Kart 64, the second game in the Mario Kart series, released in 1996 for the Nintendo 64
- Mana Khemia 2: Fall Of Alchemy, a video game for the PS2, released in America in 2009
- VideoSport MK2, an early video game console that was sold in the United Kingdom

== Other ==
- MK2, part of the MK postcode area
- MAP kinase kinase (MK2)
- MAPK-activated protein kinase 2 (MK2)
- MK II FPA (function point analysis), a method for evaluating size of the software systems
- S/2015 (136472) 1, a satellite of the dwarf planet Makemake. Informally nicknamed MK2
- MK2, a French film production and distribution company, and chain of cinemas, founded by Marin Karmitz

== See also ==
- MKMK (album), a 2021 album by Maika Makovski
- MK (disambiguation)
- MKK (disambiguation)
- M2K (disambiguation)
