= Mong Kok station =

MTR interchange station in Kowloon, Hong Kong

Mong Kok 旺角
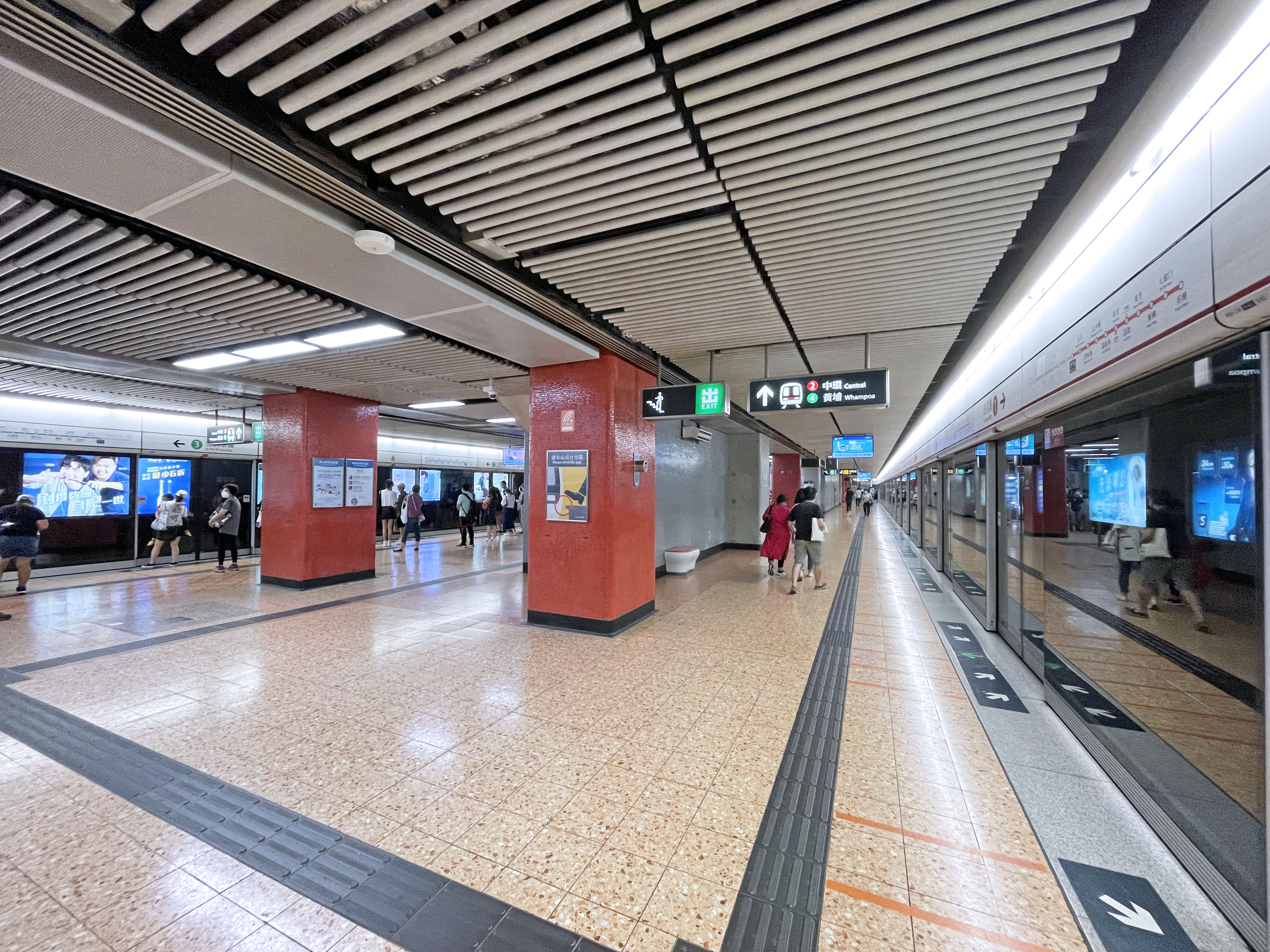
- Platform 1 of Mong Kok station in May 2022

Chinese name
- Chinese: 旺角
- Jyutping: Wong6 gok3
- Cantonese Yale: Wohng gok
- Hanyu Pinyin: Wàngjiǎo
- Literal meaning: Bustling Corner
Transcriptions
Standard Mandarin
- Hanyu Pinyin: Wàngjiǎo
Yue: Cantonese
- Yale Romanization: Wohng gok
- IPA: [wɔŋ˨kɔk̚˧]
- Jyutping: Wong6 gok3

General information
- Location: Nathan Road × Argyle Street, Mong Kok; Yau Tsim Mong District, Hong Kong; Hong Kong
- Coordinates: 22°19′09″N 114°10′10″E
- System: MTR rapid transit station
- Operator: MTR Corporation
- Lines: Kwun Tong line; Tsuen Wan line
- Platforms: 4 (2 island platforms)
- Tracks: 4
- Connections: Bus, minibus (Red and Green)

Construction
- Structure type: Underground
- Platform levels: 2
- Accessible: yes

Other information
- Station code: MOK

History
- Opened: Kwun Tong line : 31 December 1979; 46 years ago; Tsuen Wan line : 17 May 1982; 44 years ago
- Former names: Argyle

Key dates
- 1979: Station opens as Argyle
- 1985: Renamed to Mong Kok

Services
Preceding station	MTR	Following station
Yau Ma Tei towards Central	Tsuen Wan line	Prince Edward towards Tsuen Wan
Yau Ma Tei towards Whampoa	Kwun Tong line	Prince Edward towards Tiu Keng Leng
Track layout
Location
- Location within MTR Location within Hong Kong urban core

Mong Kok station (formerly named Argyle station until 31 May 1985) is an MTR station in Mong Kok, Kowloon, Hong Kong. The station is one of the first MTR stations established in the city, serving Kwun Tong and Tsuen Wan line.

The station’s colour scheme is red and medium grey. The station was initially named after Argyle Street as Argyle.

== Location ==
Mong Kok station is located in the centre of Mong Kok in Kowloon, along Nathan Road at the intersection with Argyle Street. Major nearby places include MOKO, Langham Place, T.O.P. and the Pioneer Centre. Mong Kok East station is located about 500 metres to the northeast.

This station and Prince Edward station are the two closest stations in Hong Kong. They are only 400 m (1,300 ft) apart, with trains taking less than one minute to travel from one station to the other.

== History ==
Mong Kok station opened on 31 December 1979, originally as part of the Modified Initial System. When the line split into the Kwun Tong Line and the Tsuen Wan Line in 1982, the station became an interchange station between the two lines.

== Station layout ==
Mong Kok station serves as a cross-platform interchange for passengers changing between the Tsuen Wan line and Kwun Tong line for stations in the same direction. Opposite-direction interchange of the two lines takes place at Prince Edward and Yau Ma Tei.

G	Ground level	Exits
L1	Concourse	Customer Service, MTRshops
L1	Concourse	Vending machines, Automatic teller machines
L1	Concourse	Octopus Promotion Machine
L2; Green and Black Platform	Platform 1	Tsuen Wan line towards Tsuen Wan (Prince Edward) →
L2; Green and Black Platform	Island platform, doors will open on the left for Kwun Tong line, right for Tsuen Wan line
L2; Green and Black Platform	Platform 3	Kwun Tong line towards Tiu Keng Leng (Prince Edward) →
L3; Purple and Magenta Platform	Platform 2	← Tsuen Wan line towards Central (Yau Ma Tei)
L3; Purple and Magenta Platform	Island platform, doors will open on the left for Tsuen Wan line, right for Kwun Tong line
L3; Purple and Magenta Platform	Platform 4	← Kwun Tong line towards Whampoa (Yau Ma Tei)

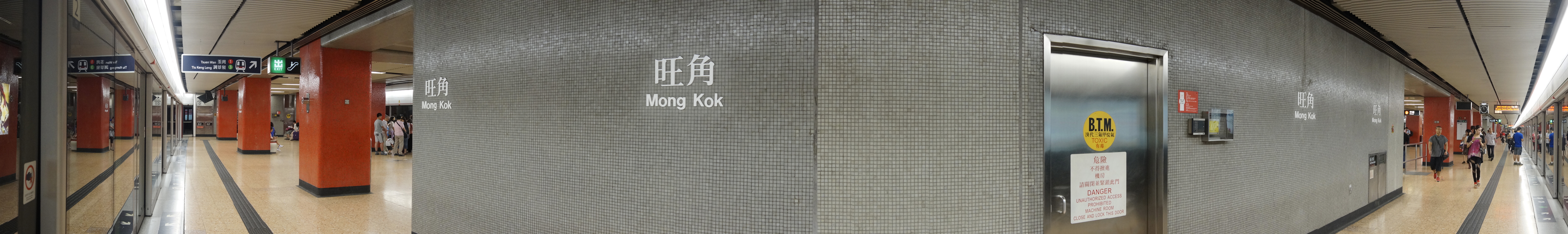
Panorama of P2 platforms in July 2013

=== Entrances and exits ===
Mong Kok station has 15 entrances, tied with East Tsim Sha Tsui station as stations with most exits in the MTR. The exits are located within one block north and south of the intersection of Nathan Road and Argyle Street, connecting buildings, shopping malls, main roads and ground transport facilities nearby.

- A1: Mong Kok Road
- A2: Portland Street
- B1: Nathan Road
- B2: Fa Yuen Street Municipal Services Building
- B3: MOKO, Mong Kok East Station
- B4: T.O.P (This Is Our Place) Mall
- C1: Hang Seng Mongkok Building
- C2: Shanghai Street
- C3: Langham Place
- C4: HSBC Building Mong Kok
- D1: Shanghai Commercial Bank Building, Argyle Street, Hua Chiao Com Bldg
- D2: Argyle Centre
- D3: Tung Choi Street
- E1: Grand Plaza
- E2: CMB Wing Lung Bank Centre

=== MTR East Rail line ===
Mong Kok East station (formerly Mong Kok KCR station) on the East Rail line and Mong Kok station are considerably far apart, at about 600 yards (550 m). The Mong Kok Road footbridge system and MOKO shopping centre connect Mong Kok East to Mong Kok station at its exit B3. As an alternative, passengers bound for the East Rail line may interchange at Kowloon Tong station.

== Gallery ==
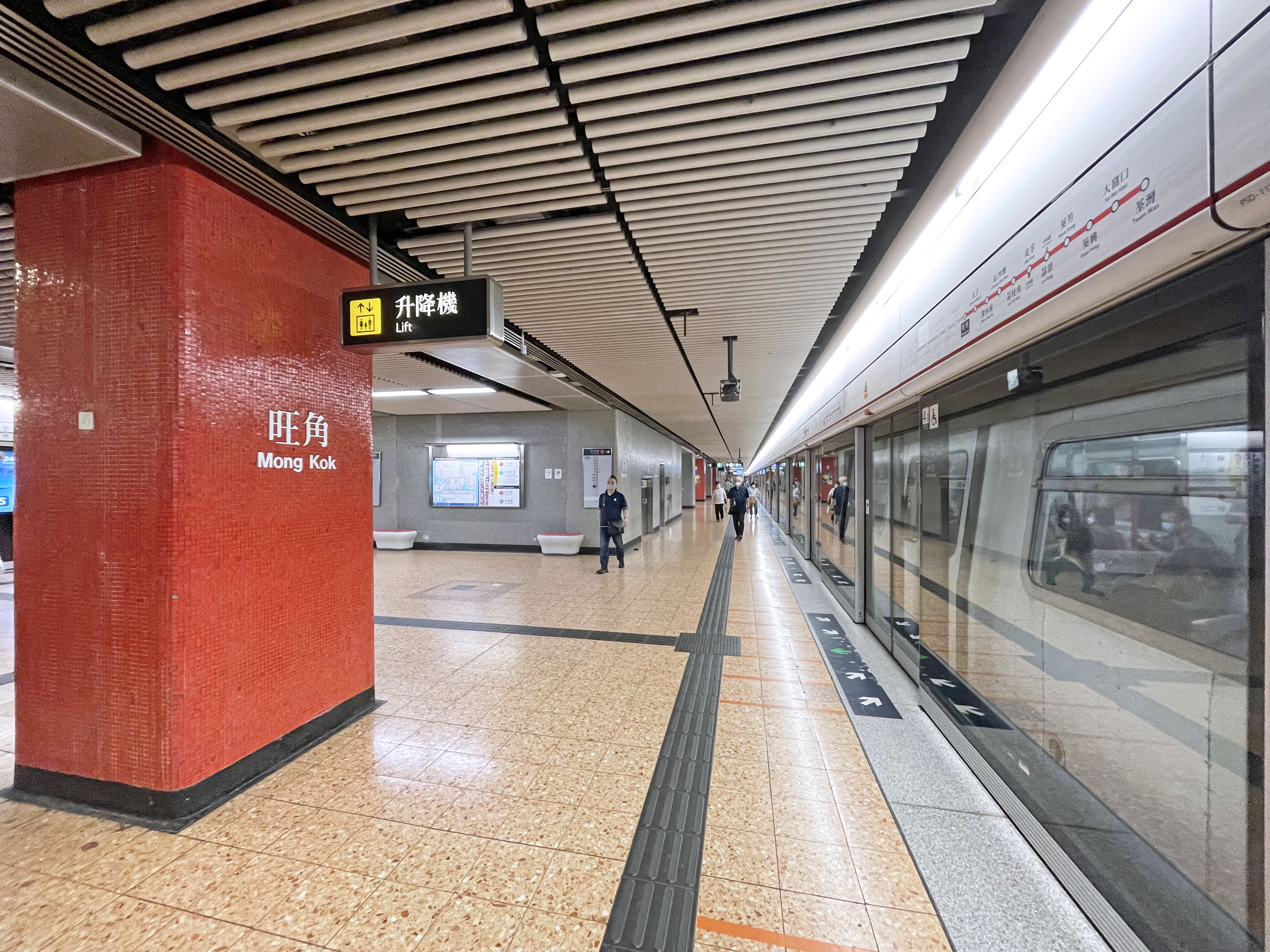
Tsuen Wan-bound M-train (2022)

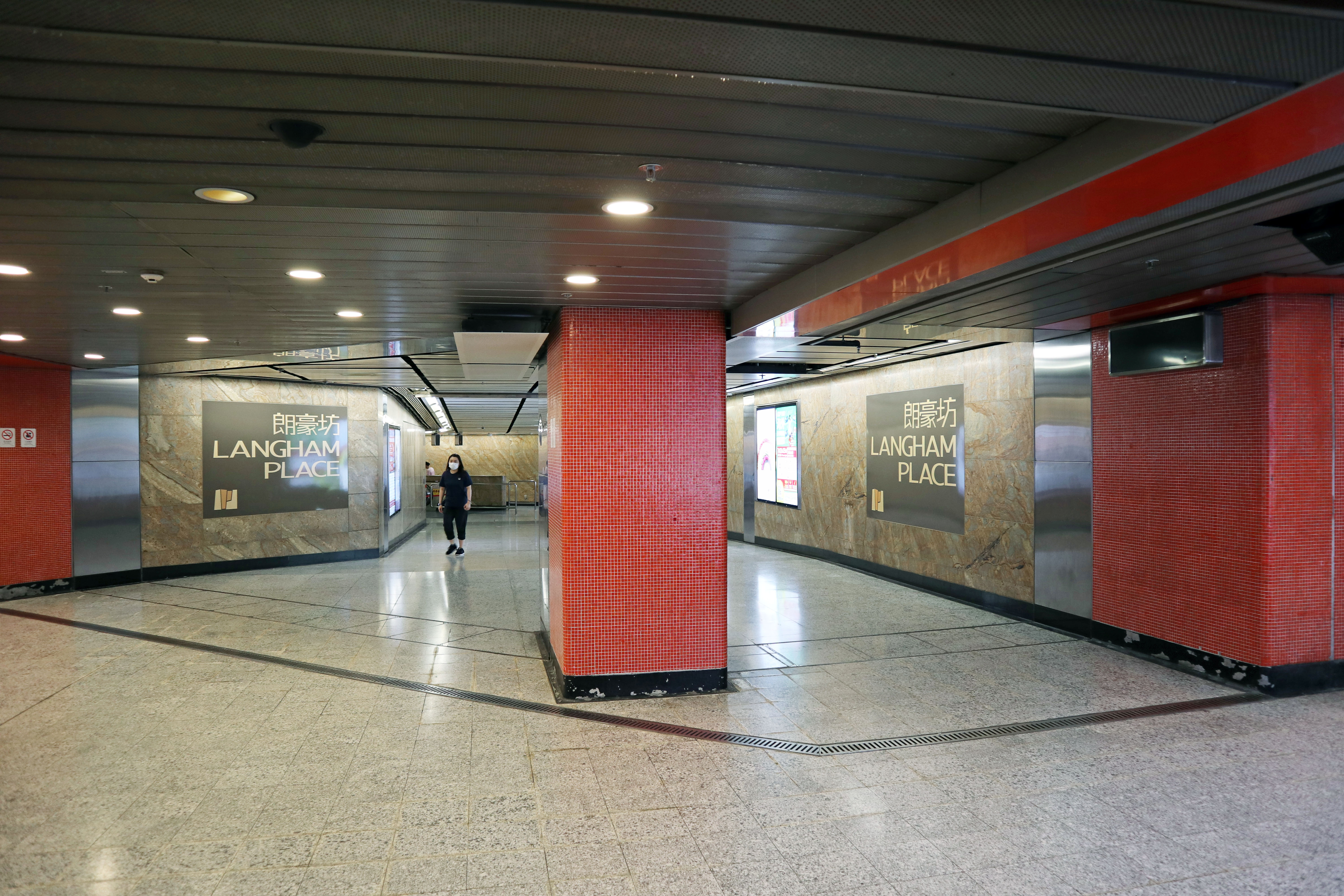
Exit C3 access to Langham Place (2020)

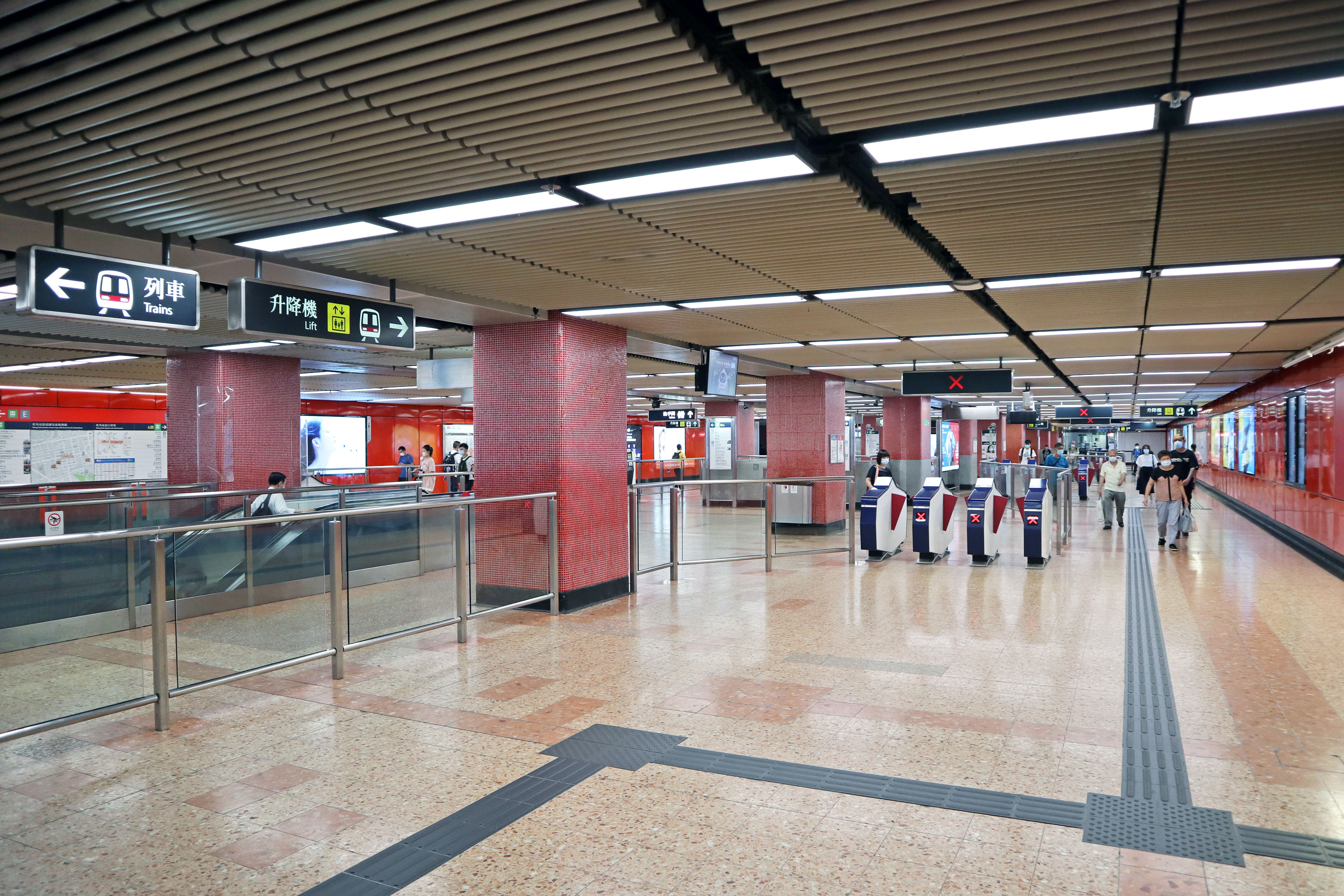
Station concourse (2020)

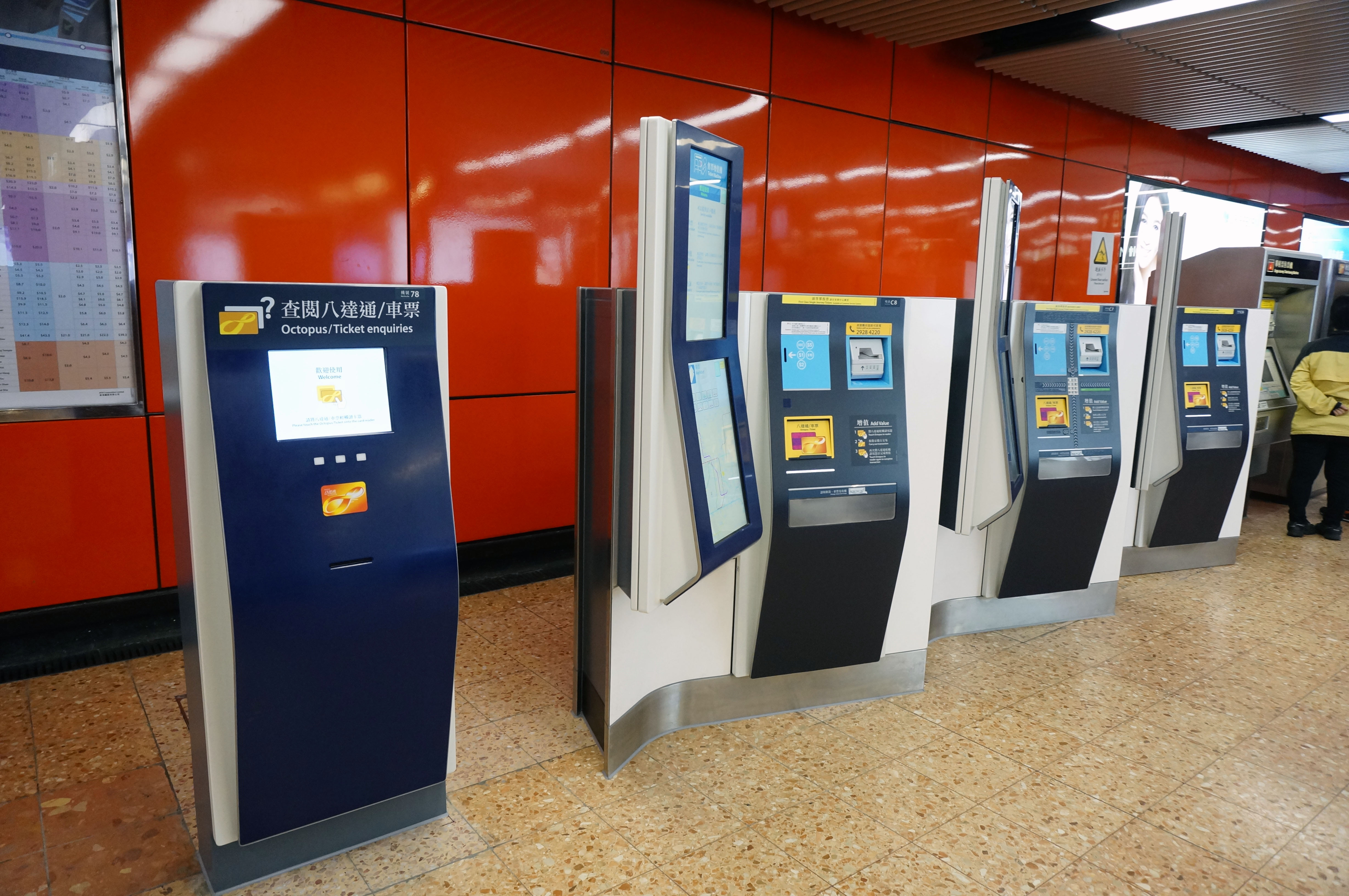
Ticket sales and Octopus card top-up machines in the unpaid area of the concourse. An Octopus Card Enquiry machine, used for checking transaction history, is seen at the left. (2017)

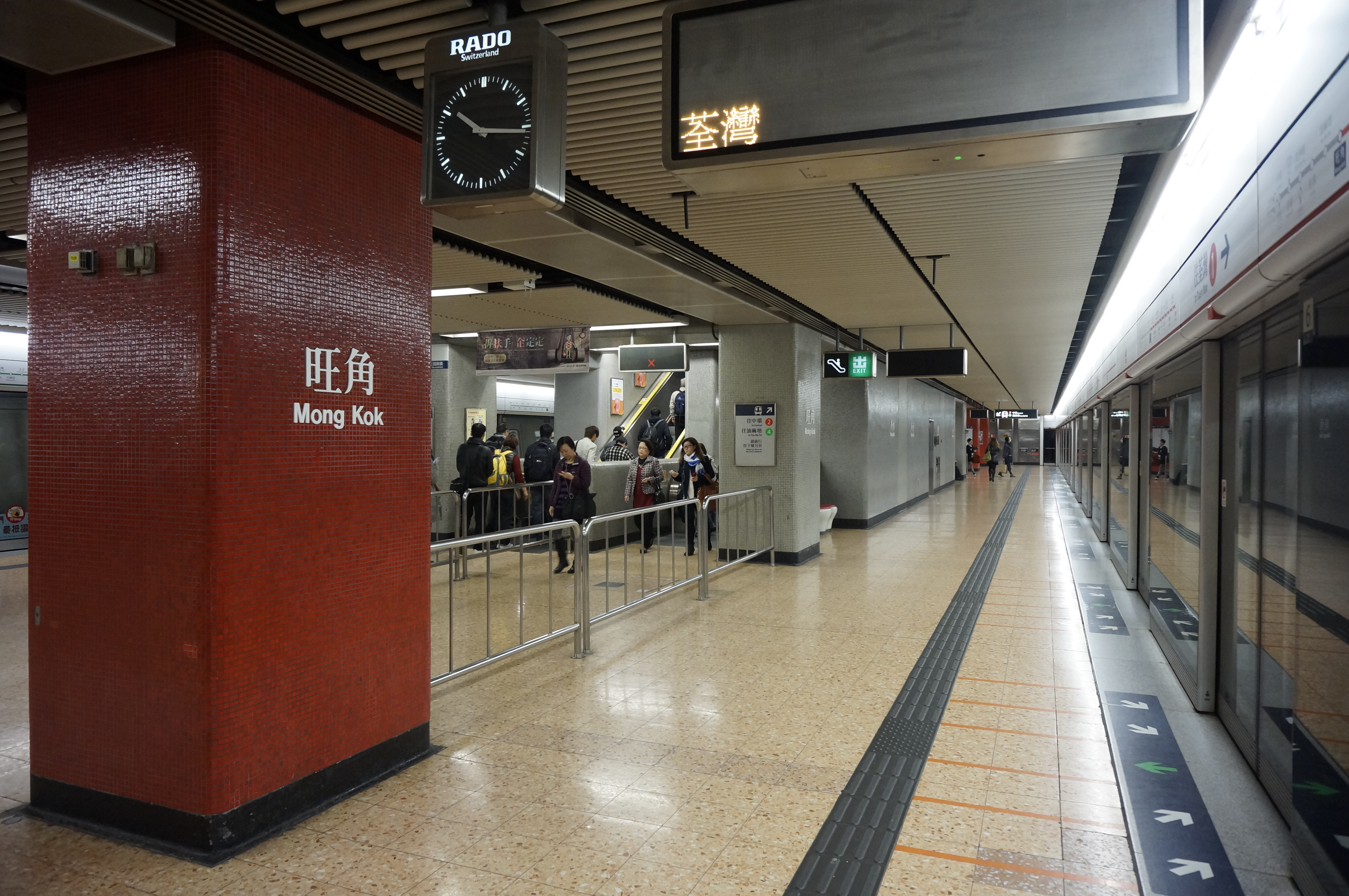
Platform 1 in February 2014
