= Royal Plaza Hotel (Hong Kong) =

Hotel in Mong Kok, Hong Kong

Coordinates: 22.32300°N 114.1719°E

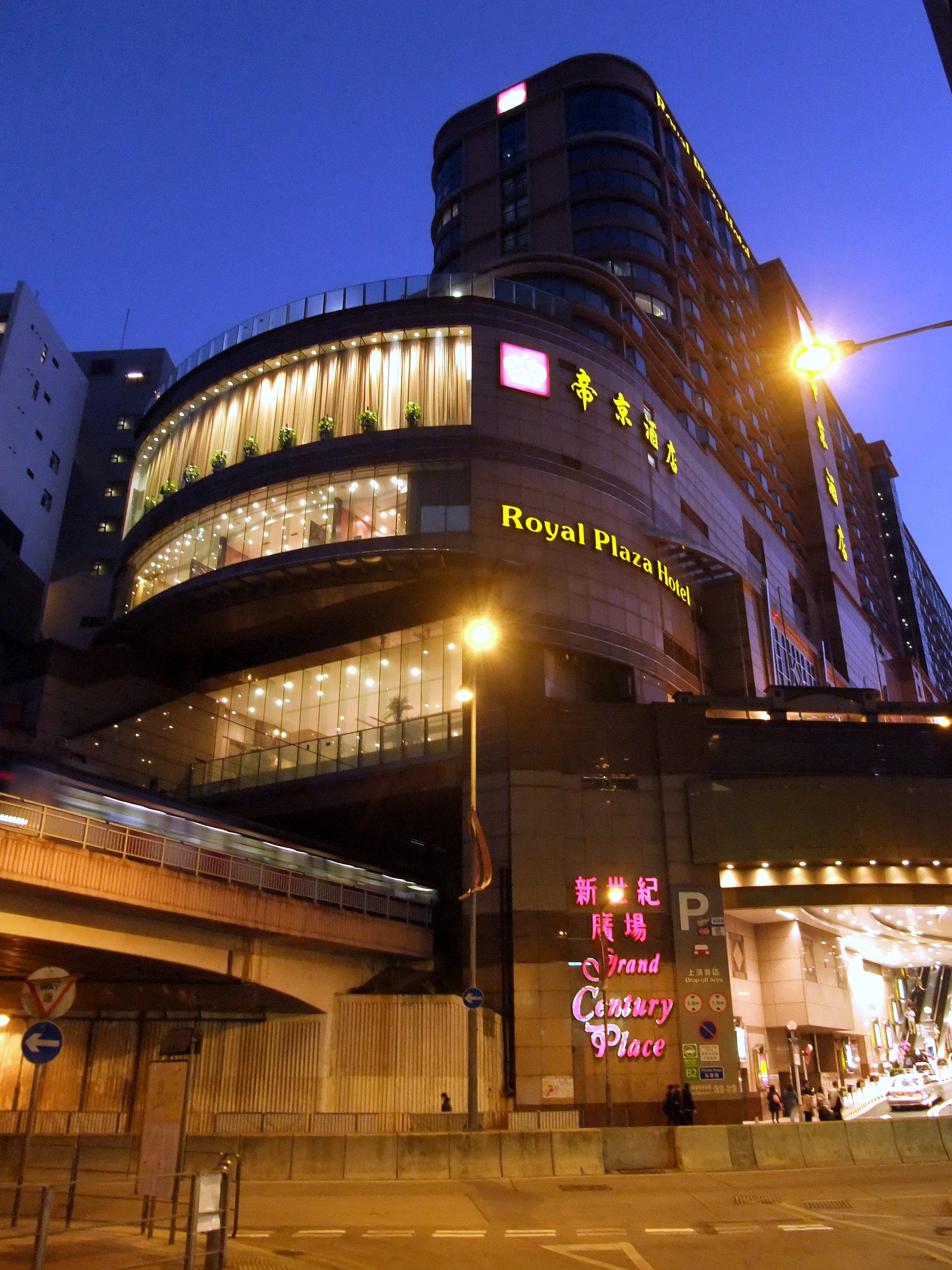
Royal Plaza Hotel in 2011

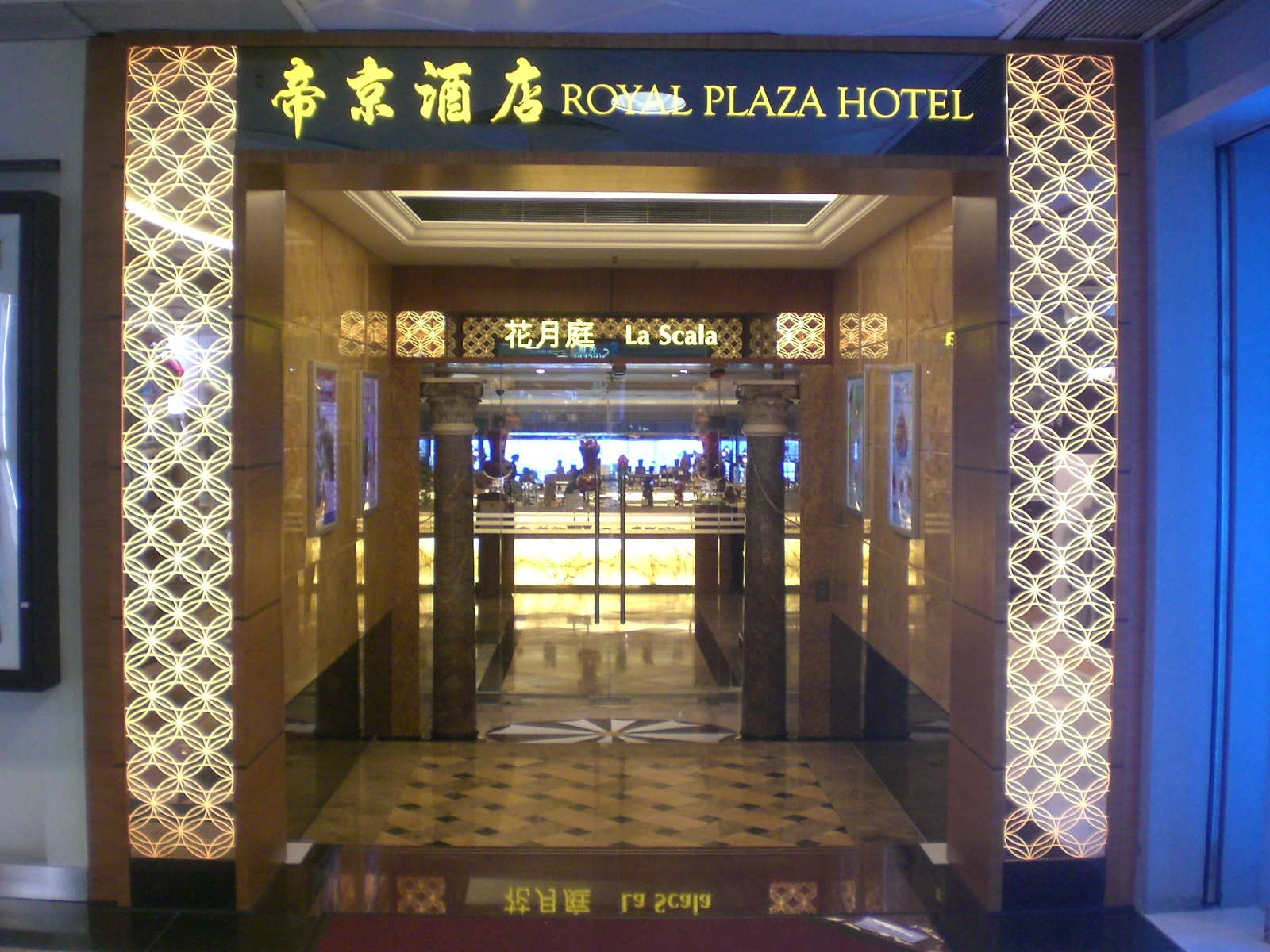
Entrance of Royal Plaza Hotel at MOKO (before remodeling)

Royal Plaza Hotel (Chinese: 帝京酒店) is a hotel located on Prince Edward Road West, Mong Kok, Kowloon, and Hong Kong that opened in 1997.

Owned by Sun Hung Kai Properties, it is located at Grand Century Place and with direct access to the Mong Kok East station of the MTR and MOKO.

== History ==
At the end of 1990, the Kowloon-Canton Railway Corporation entered a joint venture with Sun Hung Kai Properties to develop the site. A land premium of around HK$2.5 billion was accordingly paid to the government in 1993.

The development, called Grand Century Place, was designed by Hong Kong architecture firm Wong & Ouyang. The hotel component, named Royal Plaza Hotel, opened in 1997.

== Features ==
The hotel has two restaurants, a Grand Ballroom and a Junior Ballroom. It also has a Health Club, which provides comprehensive health and recreational facilities:

- Massage service
- Sauna
- Modern cardio equipment
- Weight training machines
- 40m length outdoor swimming pool
- Children pool
- Fitness Center and Swimming Pool
- Fitness Center: Mon – Sun 6:30am – 10:30pm
- Swimming Pool: Mon – Sun 7:00am – 9:00pm
- Hotline: (852) 2622 6282

It also has a ballroom and meeting rooms. Additionally, they also have an electric charging point for Tesla vehicles. Tesla vehicle owners can enjoy maximum 2 hours of complimentary parking (including Tesla Connector charging time) with consumption of dining service at HK$500 or above at designated restaurants in Hotel (Di King Heen and Lion Rock) upon production of valid receipt issued on the same day by the Hotel. Valet parking service charge would be applied after 2 hours complimentary parking at HK$60 per hour.

Connecting to the hotel is a shopping mall named MOKO at Grand Century Place with many famous brands like MLB, Adidas, New Balance; restaurants (Genki Sushi, Urban Cafe, Outback Steakhouse, Men Wah Bing Ting), a food court, and a cinema. Connecting to MOKO and the hotel is the Mong Kok East station of the MTR.

== Reviews ==
The hotel was recommended by the Michelin Guide's "Michelin Guide Hong Kong Macau" as a "high-grade cozy" hotel five consecutive times between 2009 and 2013. It received Wedding Magazine's "best venue (hotel) for star wedding banquet" listing for five consecutive years. In his 2013 book The Book of Perfect Wedding Preparation, wedding planner Tim Lau said Royal Plaza Hotel would be a good choice for a wedding venue. He observed that the staff were very attentive, the venue offered different food options for Chinese-style and Western-style weddings, and it was conveniently located near the MTR station. The Times of India reviewer Resham Sengar called the hotel "a cosy place in the heart of the city" that "has a reputation for rendering satisfactory service to its visitors".

== See also ==
- Royal Park Hotel (Sha Tin)
