= Prince Edward station =

MTR interchange station in Kowloon, Hong Kong

Prince Edward 太子
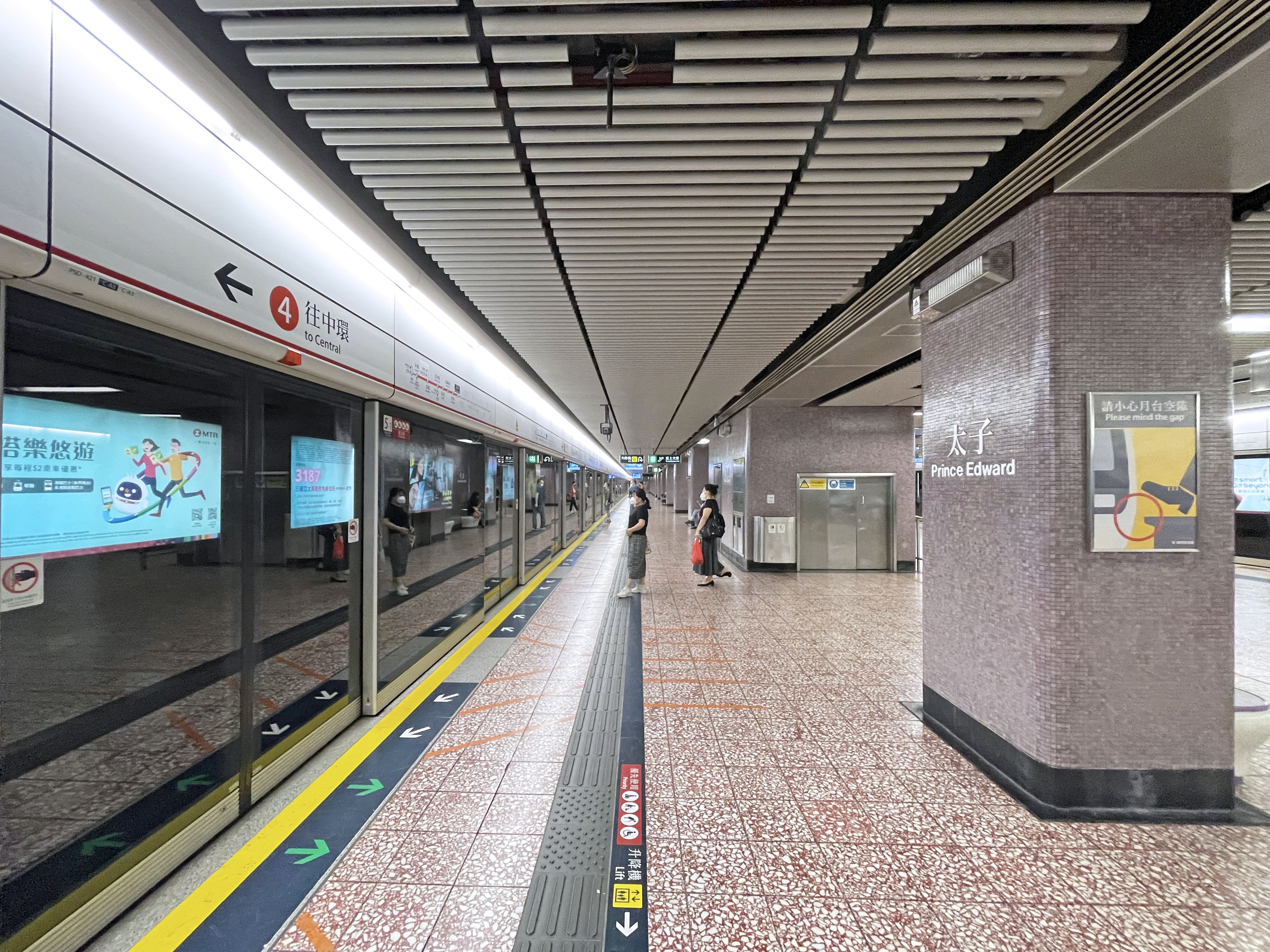
- Platforms 4 (foreground) and 3 (background) in May 2022

General information
- Location: Nathan Road × Prince Edward Road West, Mong Kok; Yau Tsim Mong District; Hong Kong
- Coordinates: 22°19′28″N 114°10′06″E
- System: MTR rapid transit station
- Owner: MTR Corporation
- Operator: MTR Corporation
- Lines: Kwun Tong line; Tsuen Wan line
- Platforms: 4 (2 island platforms)
- Tracks: 4
- Connections: Bus, minibus; Coaches to Mainland China

Construction
- Structure type: Underground
- Platform levels: 2 (excluding concourse)
- Accessible: Yes

Other information
- Station code: PRE

History
- Opened: 10 May 1982; 44 years ago

Services
Preceding station	MTR	Following station
Mong Kok towards Central	Tsuen Wan line	Sham Shui Po towards Tsuen Wan
Mong Kok towards Whampoa	Kwun Tong line	Shek Kip Mei towards Tiu Keng Leng
Track layout
Location
- Location within MTR Location within Hong Kong urban core

Prince Edward station
- Chinese: 太子
- Jyutping: Taai3 zi2
- Literal meaning: Crown Prince
Transcriptions
Standard Mandarin
- Hanyu Pinyin: Tàizǐ
Yue: Cantonese
- Yale Romanization: Taaizí
- Jyutping: Taai3 zi2
- IPA: [tʰaj˧tsi˧˥]

Prince Edward is an MTR station on the Kwun Tong line and Tsuen Wan line. It is located under the intersection of Nathan Road and Prince Edward Road West, after which it is named. The station’s colour scheme is light purple.

== History ==
Prince Edward was primarily designed as a cross-platform interchange between the Kwun Tong and Tsuen Wan lines. While the Kwun Tong line tracks had already been built in 1979, the station was not used until the opening of the Tsuen Wan line on 10 May 1982. During the first week of operation, the station served only as an interchange with no exits to the concourse or street level. On 17 May 1982, all the station's exits were opened.

=== Prince Edward station attack ===
On the evening of 31 August 2019, amid the anti-extradition bill protests, the Hong Kong Police stormed Prince Edward station and were filmed beating passengers and firing pepper spray inside railway carriages. The MTR closed the station during the incident, while the police refused to let medics enter. The station subsequently became a flashpoint for continued discord, with protesters petitioning MTR to release CCTV footage from the evening of 31 August. The incident at Prince Edward, as well as MTR's perceived support of Beijing (by closing stations near protests in the aftermath of criticism by Chinese state media for remaining operational), led to vandalism of other MTR stations. MTR condemned the vandalism and responded that the relevant CCTV footage would be kept for three years.

== Location ==
Prince Edward station and Mong Kok station are the two closest stations in Hong Kong. They are only 400 m (1,300 ft) apart. Trains take less than one minute to travel from one station to the other.

== Station layout ==
G	Ground level	Exits
L1	Concourse	Customer Service, MTRshops
L1	Concourse	Vending machines, Automatic teller machines
L1	Concourse	Octopus Promotion Machine
L2; Interchange Platform	Platform 1	Tsuen Wan line towards Tsuen Wan (Sham Shui Po) →
L2; Interchange Platform	Island platform, doors will open on the right
L2; Interchange Platform	Platform 2	← Kwun Tong line towards Whampoa (Mong Kok)
L3; Mezzanine Platform	Platform 4	← Tsuen Wan line towards Central (Mong Kok)
L3; Mezzanine Platform	Island platform, doors will open on the left
L3; Mezzanine Platform	Platform 3	Kwun Tong line towards Tiu Keng Leng (Shek Kip Mei) →

Prince Edward is a cross-platform interchange station for the southbound Kwun Tong line passengers going northbound on the Tsuen Wan line, and southbound Tsuen Wan line passengers going towards Tiu Keng Leng. Mong Kok serves as the cross-platform interchange station for passengers travelling in the same direction.

=== Colour scheme ===
The station's colour scheme is light purple because of its association as a regal colour.

=== Entrances and exits ===
All exits are within one block of Nathan Road, stretching from Prince Edward Road in the south to Playing Field Road in the north. Prince Edward station is primarily an interchange rather than a destination since there are only seven exits; the neighbouring Mong Kok has fifteen.

- A: Mong Kok Stadium, Playing Field Road, Prince Centre
- B: Mong Kok Police Station
  - B1: Flower Market Road
  - B2: Sai Yeung Choi Street South, Elize PARK
- C: Metropark Hotel Mongkok
  - C1: Nathan Road, Golden Plaza
  - C2: Metropark Hotel Mongkok, Tai Nan Street, Tong Mi Road, Tai Kok Tsui
- D: Yu Chau Street
- E: Cheung Sha Wan Road, Union Park Centre

== Transport connections ==
=== Cross-border bus services ===
There are stops for cross-border buses to Shenzhen, Dongguan, and Guangzhou on Playing Field Road (exit A) or Portland Street (exits C2 and D).

== Gallery ==
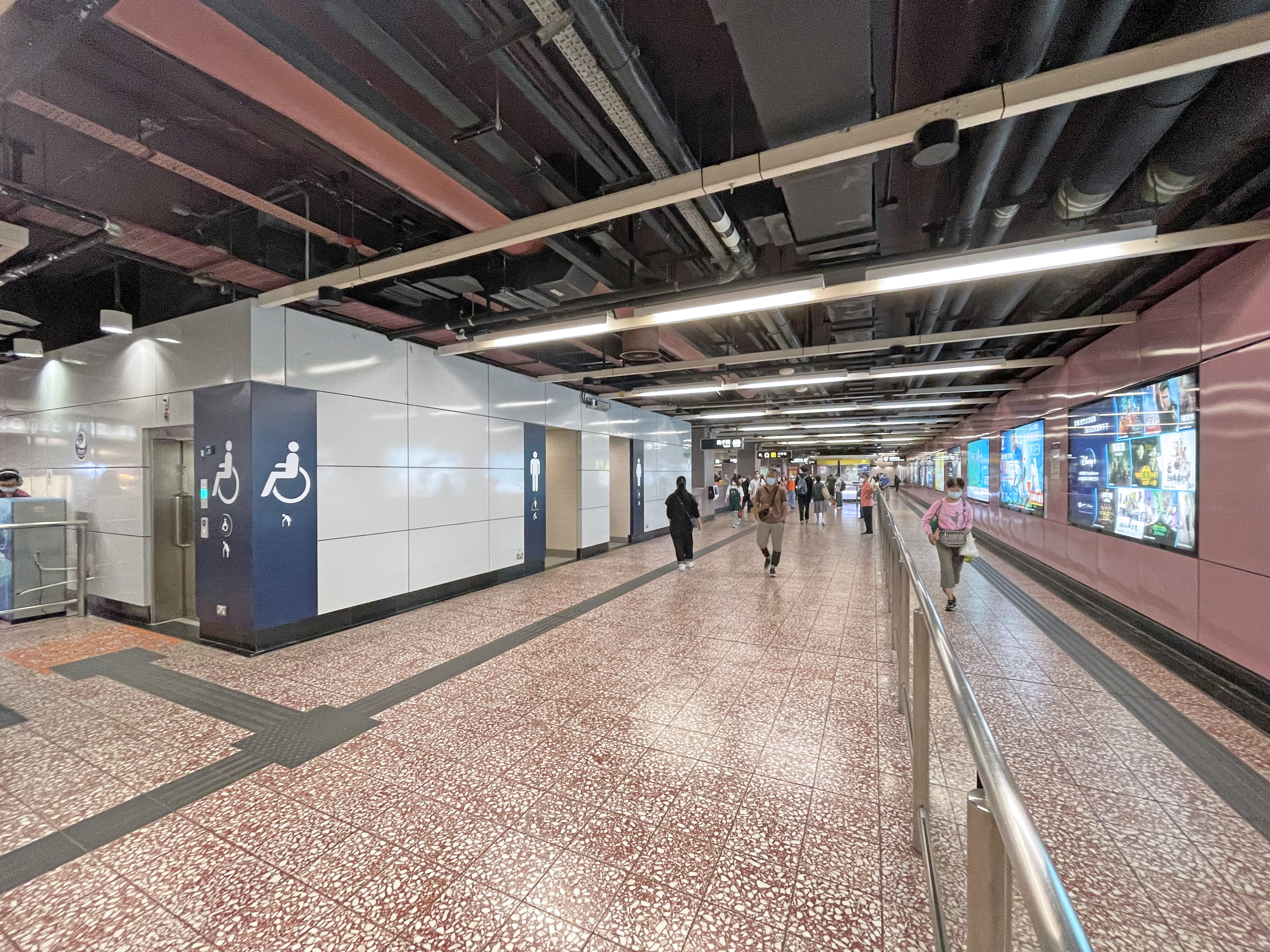
Washrooms in the paid area of the concourse (2022)

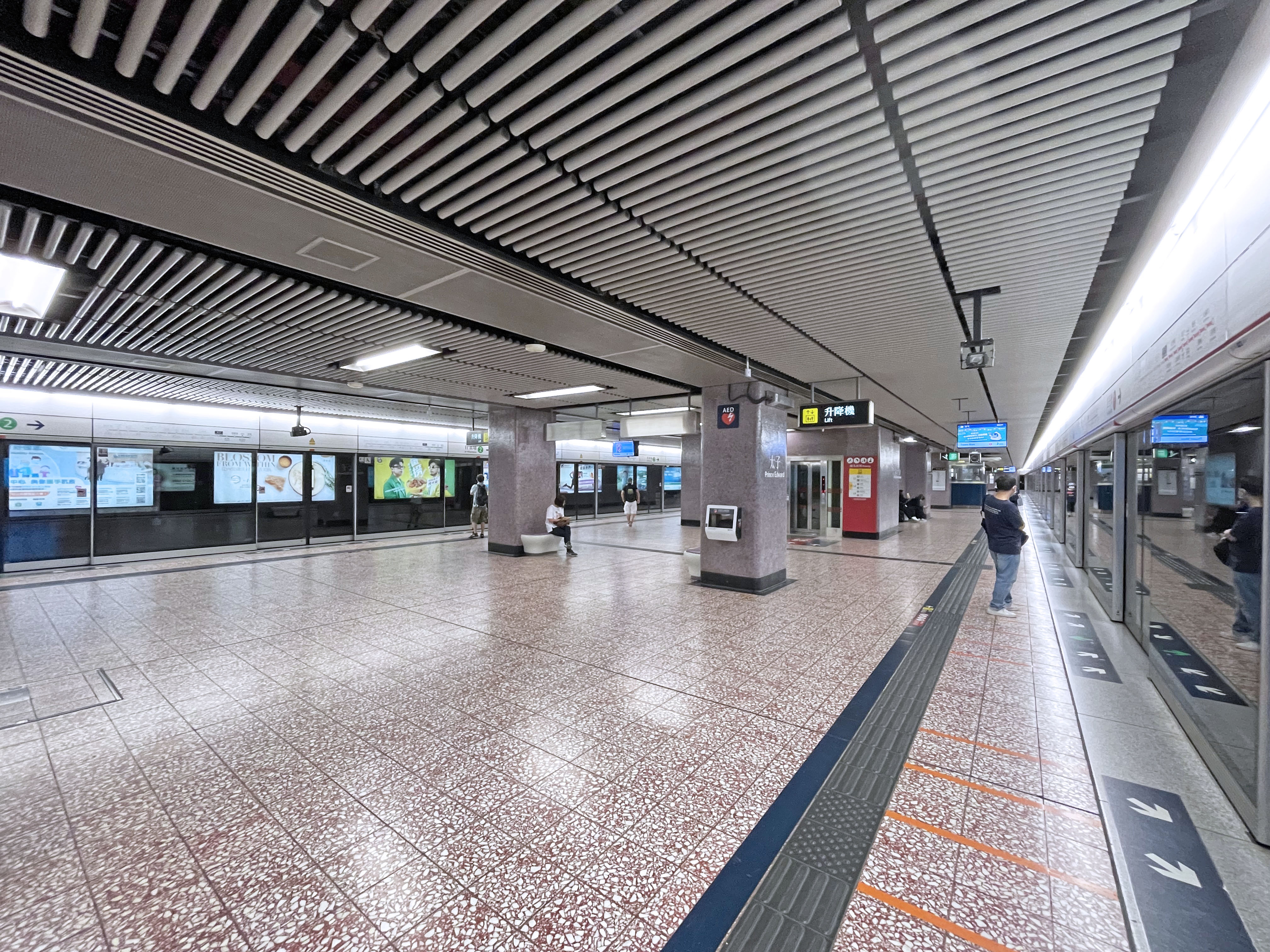
Platforms (2022)

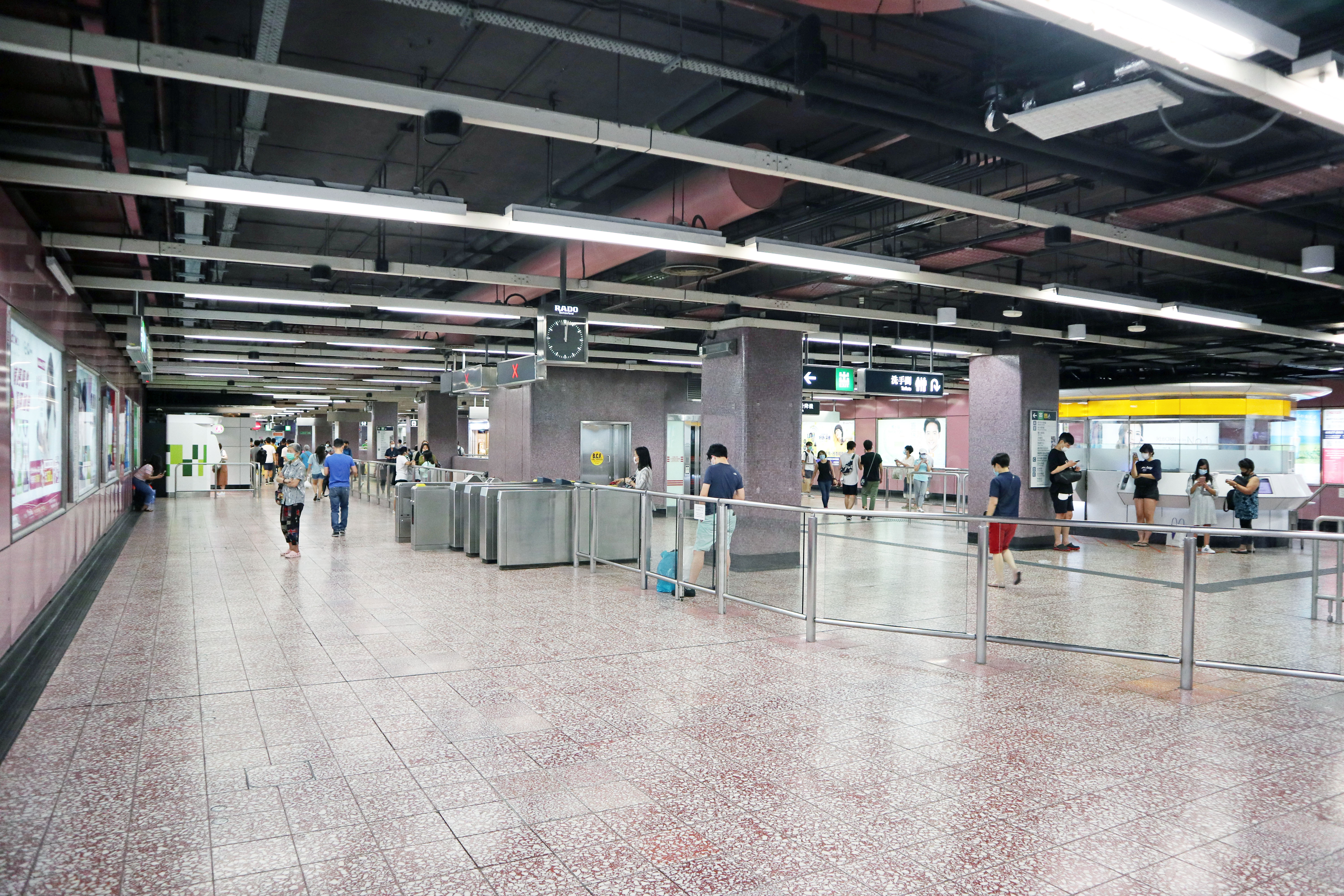
Station concourse (2020)

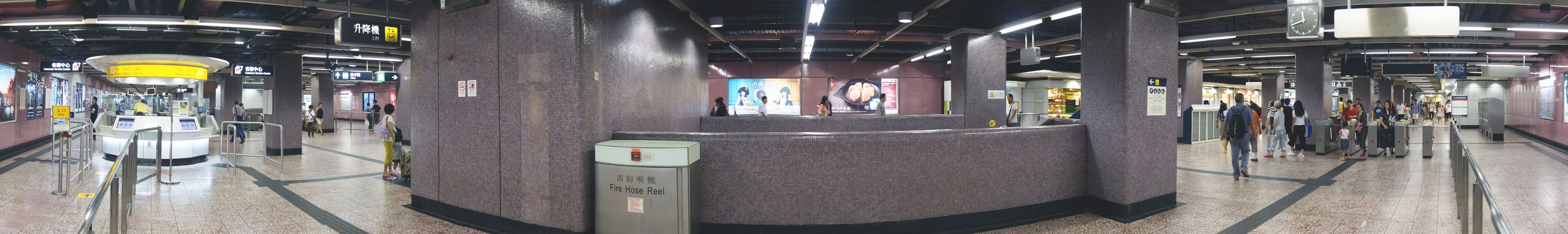
Panorama of the concourse with the customer service centre visible on the left (2020)

== See also ==
- Prince Edward, Hong Kong
- 2019 Prince Edward station attack
