= Royal Park Hotel =

Hotel in Shatin, Hong Kong

Coordinates: 22.3795°N 114.1885°E

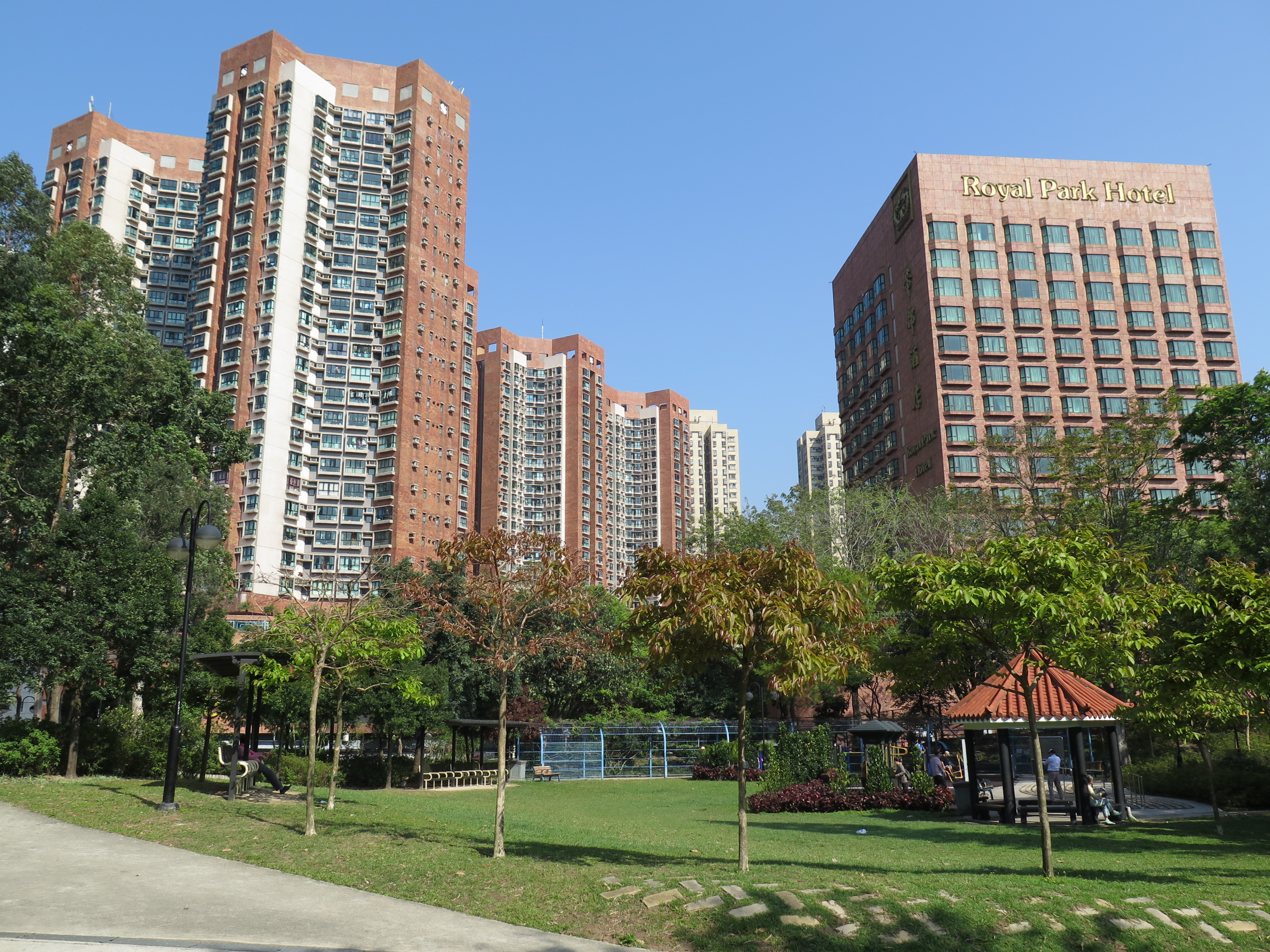
- Royal Park Hotel (right)

- Location within Hong Kong

General information
- Status: Completed
- Type: Hotel
- Architectural style: Modernism
- Location: 8 Pak Hok Ting Street; Shatin, Hong Kong
- Topped-out: 1 November 1988
- Opened: 3 August 1989
- Inaugurated: 1 December 1989
- Owner: Sun Hung Kai Properties

Technical details
- Floor count: 16

Design and construction
- Developer: Sun Hung Kai Properties
- Main contractor: SHK Shimizu

Other information
- Number of rooms: 443
- Number of restaurants: 3
- Number of bars: 1
- Public transit: Sha Tin station

Website
- royalpark.com.hk

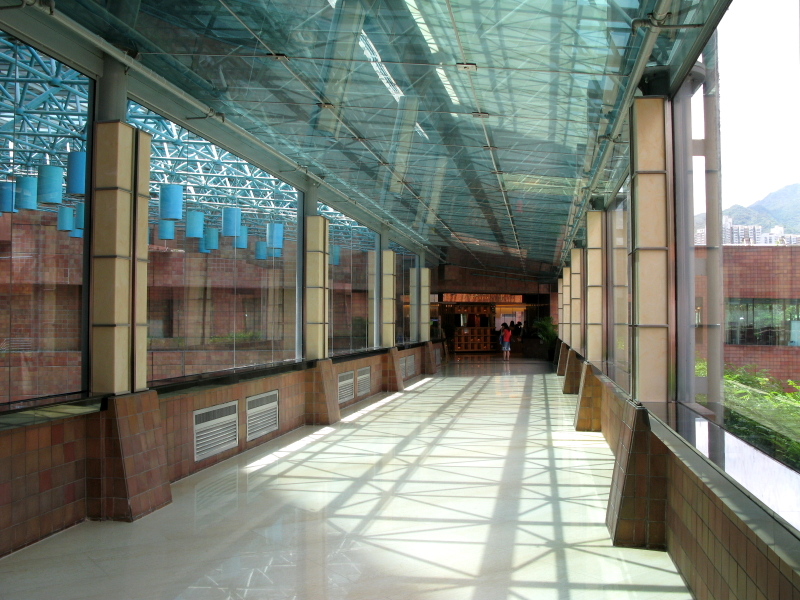
Corridor linking New Town Plaza and Royal Park Hotel

The Royal Park Hotel (Chinese: 帝都酒店), established in 1989, is one of the largest hotels in Sha Tin, New Territories, Hong Kong. Owned by Sun Hung Kai Properties, the 443-room hotel is part of phase two of New Town Plaza, the largest shopping centre in the district.

== History ==
=== Background ===
The site of the hotel used to be part of RAF Shatin, a Royal Air Force airbase with a single concrete runway. The lot was leased to developer Sun Hung Kai Properties in the early 1980s as part of the development of Sha Tin New Town.

The hotel and the adjacent New Town Tower (an office building) comprise phase two of the New Town Plaza development.

=== Construction and opening ===
While under construction, the project was named "New Town Hotel". The main contractor was SHK Shimizu, a joint venture between Sun Hung Kai Properties and the Japanese construction firm Shimizu Corporation. The hotel and the adjacent New Town Tower were formally topped out on 1 November 1988.

The hotel primarily targeted business travellers, particularly those dealing with the manufacturing and garment companies in the industrial estates of the New Territories. The Tiananmen Square massacre occurred while construction was nearing completion, leading Sun Hung Kai to revise its first-year occupancy target for the hotel downwards due to the slump in the travel industry.

The hotel began operations on 3 August 1989 with a soft opening that saw 170 of the rooms put into use. It was formally opened on 1 December 1989 by Secretary for Planning, Environment and Lands Graham Barnes. The hotel, built at a cost of around HK$400 million (excluding the land cost), originally had 442 rooms.

=== 2008 Beijing Olympics ===
During the Beijing Olympics in 2008, the hotel served as an Olympic Village providing accommodation to equestrian competitors and support staff.

=== Renovations ===
A renovation of the main lobby was completed in 2005. In August 2007, renovations of the guestrooms were completed.

A renovation of the hotel's largest banquet hall was completed in May 2018. The venue now includes an outdoor garden.

== Facilities ==
It has a total of 443 guestrooms and suites. Dining facilities include Japanese and Chinese restaurants and a buffet serving breakfast, lunch, and dinner. The hotel also has a gym, a swimming pool, and events facilities. Each floor is equipped with a water dispenser on the left hand side of the elevators. There are self-service washing machines on the 6th floor.

== Transport ==
Royal Park Hotel is within walking distance of Sha Tin station. There is also a Kowloon Motor Bus (KMB) stop in front of the hotel.

== See also ==
- Royal Plaza Hotel (Hong Kong)
