= MK3 =

MK3 may refer to:

- Mortal Kombat 3, the third game in the Mortal Kombat series
- Mario Kart: Super Circuit, the third game in the Mario Kart series
- MAP kinase kinase kinase (MK3)
- MAPK-activated protein kinase 3 (MK3)
- Mark III (disambiguation) and Mark 3

== See also ==
- MKKK (disambiguation)
- M3K (disambiguation)
- MK (disambiguation)
