= Grand Century Place =

Multicomplex in Mong Kok, Hong Kong

MOKO

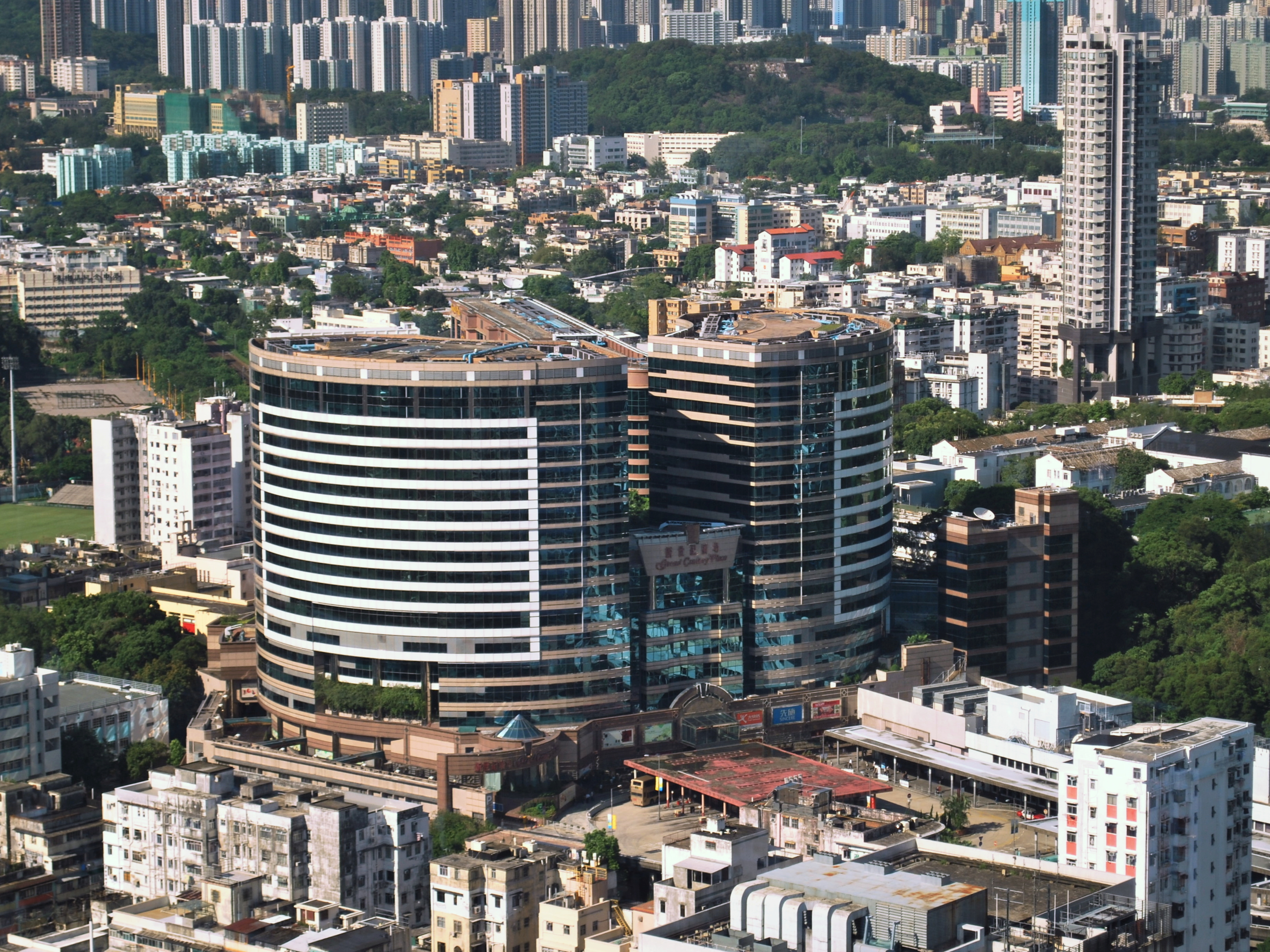
- Location: Mong Kok, Hong Kong
- Coordinates: 22.3231°N 114.1723°E
- Address: 193 Prince Edward Road West
- Opened: 4 December 1997; 28 years ago
- Manager: Kai Shing Management Services Limited
- Owner: Sun Hung Kai Properties, MTR
- Num. of stores: over 200
- Floor area: over 720,000 sq ft (67,000 m^{2})
- Floors: 7 floors (MTR, 1, 2, 3, 4, 5, 6)
- Website: grandcenturyplace.com.hk

Grand Century Place
- Traditional Chinese: 新世紀廣場
- Cantonese Yale: sān sai géi gwóng chèuhng
- Literal meaning: new century square
Transcriptions
Yue: Cantonese
- Yale Romanization: sān sai géi gwóng chèuhng
- Jyutping: san1 sai3 gei2 gwong2 coeng4

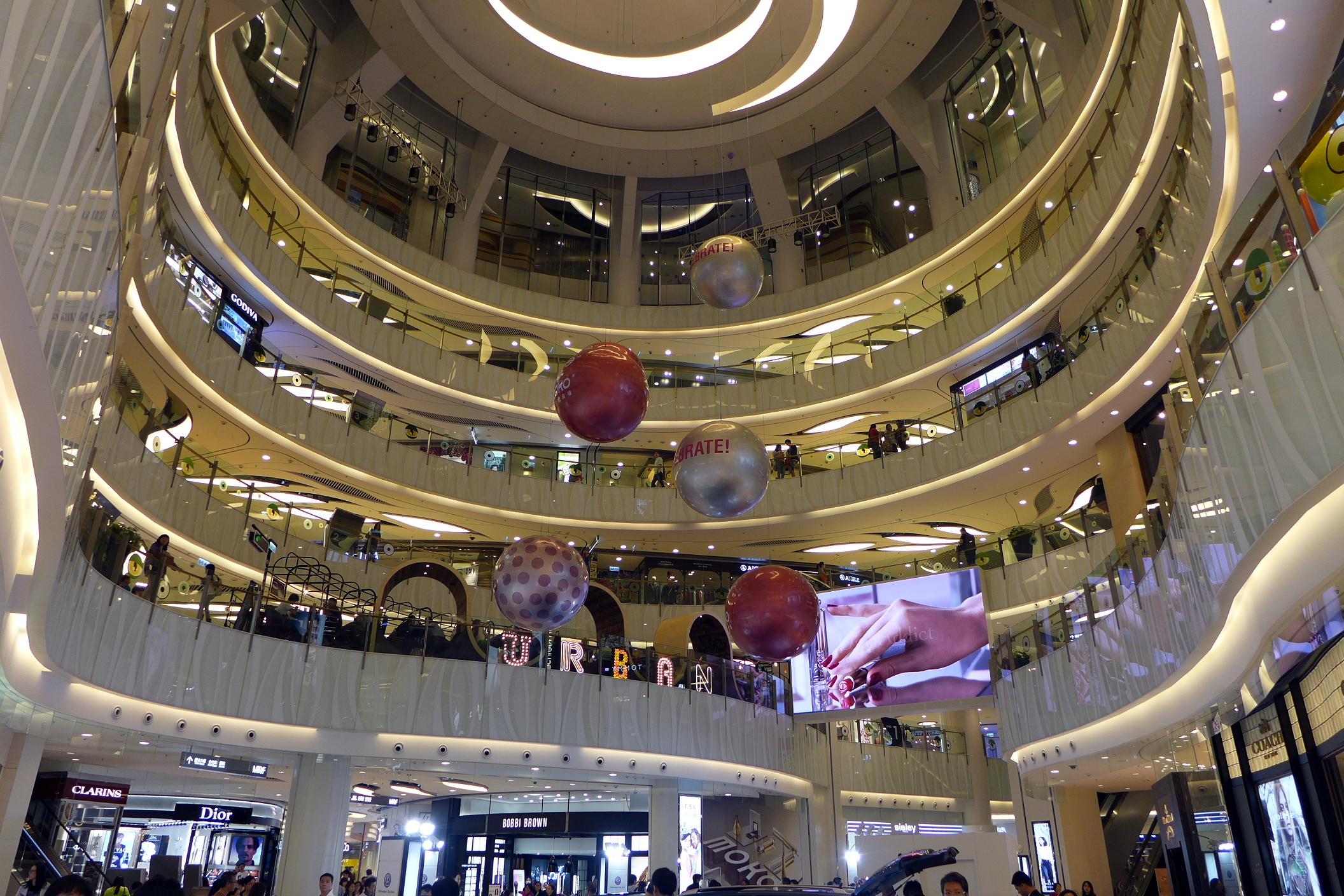
MOKO Mall Atrium (2015)

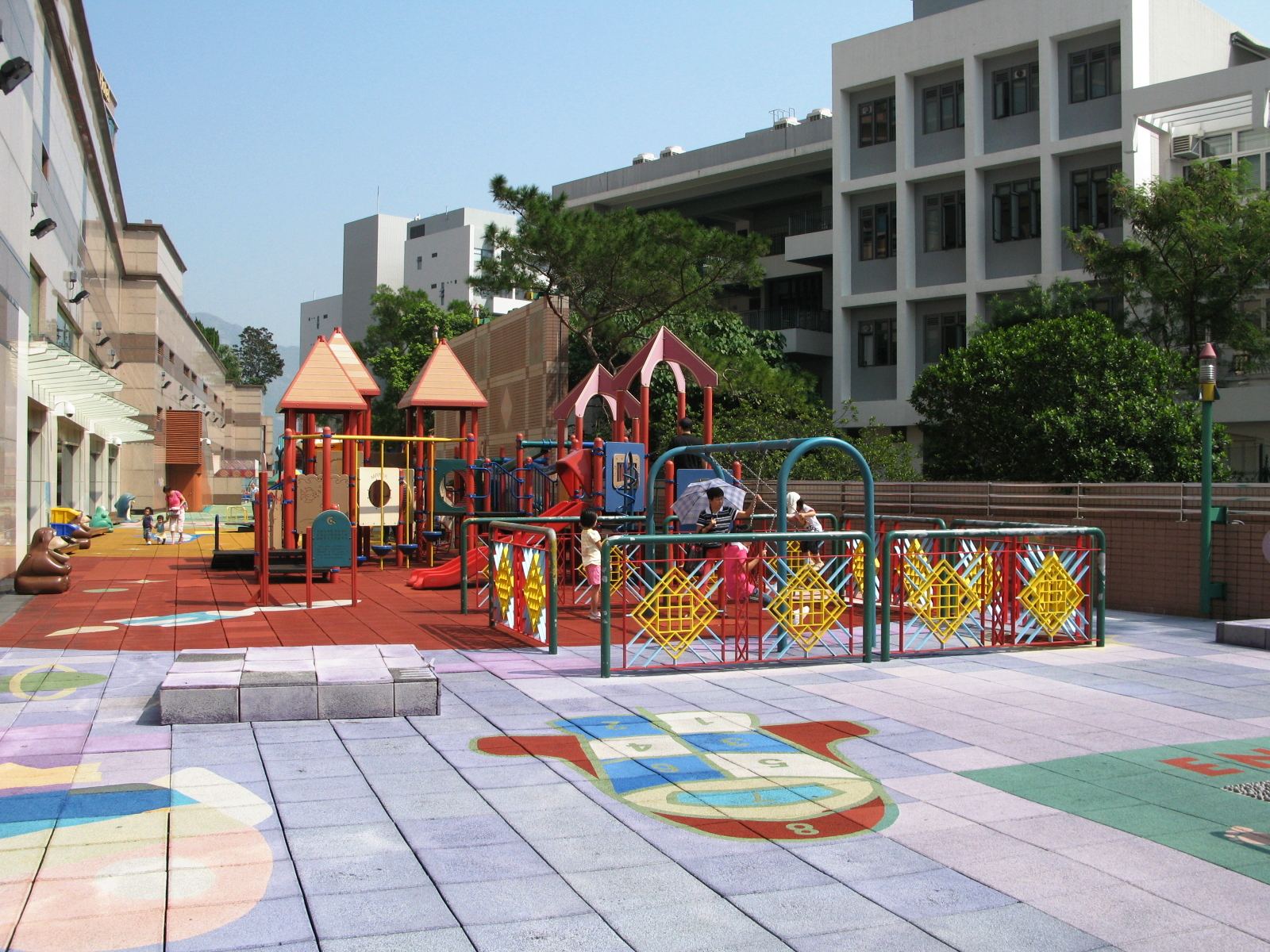
Playground in Level 5

Grand Century Place is a multicomplex including a shopping mall named MOKO, two office towers and a modern hotel named Royal Plaza Hotel. It is connected to the Mong Kok East MTR station. It has been renovated more than twice, the last one being a major overhaul, including new shops, a new front entrance and a new name.

== Shopping mall ==
MOKO is a shopping centre located in east Mong Kok, Hong Kong. There are 7 floors, consisting of the MTR floor and Levels 1–6. It is connected to Mong Kok East station.

The Royal Plaza Hotel, a five-star hotel, is located next to the shopping centre. It is connected through a passage on the MTR level, and through the hotel's 2-level "La Scala" restaurant to Royal Plaza Hotel.

== Design ==
When Grand Century Place was first constructed, it had been designed with a royal European palace feel. At that time the use of giant Roman pillars, ceiling murals and light golden yellow granite (except the 5th and 6th floor), accompanied by large tiling patterns had been one of the most distinctive features of the mall .

The original use of a round atrium as the central core in the mall, with the majority of the shops circling the atrium in a 360-degree circle design, was another distinctive feature of the mall. In the center of the mall was a circular atrium with a diameter of 30 meters, which developers then spent about $3 million to install large television screens and a musical fountain controlled by computers. However, the design made many visitors to the mall confused and lost, and modernisation works were carried out since 2002; this divided the mall into 4 areas: A, B, C and D. Another major renovation commenced in 2011 and completed in September 2015.

== Renovation ==
In 2013, the shopping mall was renovated and the 1st floor was changed to the MTR Floor with each upper floor changing one floor lower (and the mall no longer skipping floor 4). The largest shop, McDonald's, moved out with the renovation. In 2014, the name of the mall was changed to MOKO but the Chinese name remains the same. Most of the shops have moved out and new shops have moved in. As of 2016, there are two duplex shops in the 1st and the 2nd floor, Tommy Hilfiger and Calvin Klein Jeans and Underwear. There is a new food court named Food Opera in the 3rd floor and a YATA Supermarket location next to the Food Opera. Uniqlo is one of the biggest shops in the MOKO and it is the biggest Uniqlo shops in Kowloon. An Outback Steakhouse location, which is popular in Hong Kong, is located on Level 6 (formerly Level 8).

The exterior of the mall has been changed to a glass wall, while the main entrance has been redesigned with a modern, grey façade sporting the new name MOKO. The refurbishment was completed by Aedas.
