= MKULTRA (disambiguation) =

Project MKUltra is the code name for a CIA mind-control research program that began in the 1950s.

MKULTRA or MK-ULTRA may also refer to:

- MK Ultra (film), 2022 psychological thriller film written and directed by Joseph Sorrentino
- mk Ultra (California band), a defunct alternative band
- The MK Ultra, a music project by British rock musician James Ray
- "MKultra", a song by American band Unwound on the album A Single History: 1991–1997
- "MK Ultra", a song by British rock band Muse on the 2009 album The Resistance
- "MK Ultra Ragman", a song by the Canadian electro band platEAU from the 2007 album Kushbush
- "MK Ultra", a song by the American prog metal band Periphery from the 2015 album Juggernaut: Alpha
- "MK Ultra" a professional wrestling stable known by this name composed of TNA Knockouts Killer Kelly and Masha Slamovich
- MKultra Support Group, an incelcore collective by American musician Negative XP
