= Mong Kok East station =

MTR station in Kowloon, Hong Kong

Mong Kok East 旺角東
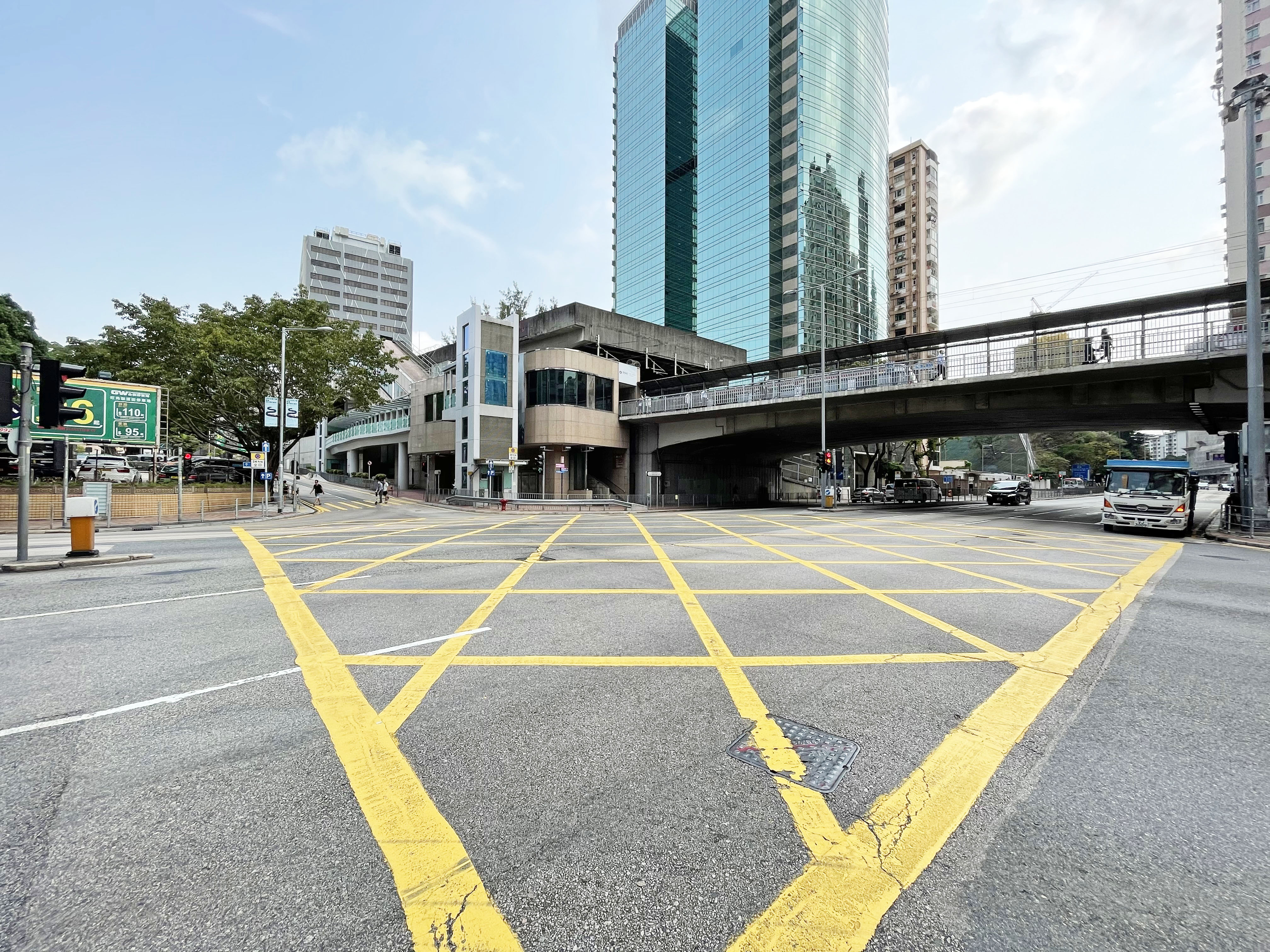
- Station exterior (from Yim Po Fong Street) in March 2021

Chinese name
- Traditional Chinese: 旺角東
- Simplified Chinese: 旺角东
- Jyutping: Wong6 gok3 dung1
- Cantonese Yale: Wohng gok dūng
- Hanyu Pinyin: Wàngjiǎodōng
- Literal meaning: Bustling Corner East
Transcriptions
Standard Mandarin
- Hanyu Pinyin: Wàngjiǎodōng
Yue: Cantonese
- Yale Romanization: Wohng gok dūng
- IPA: [wɔŋ˨kɔk̚˧tʊŋ˥]
- Jyutping: Wong6 gok3 dung1

General information
- Location: Luen Wan Street / Argyle Street, Mong Kok; Yau Tsim Mong District, Hong Kong
- Coordinates: 22°19′20″N 114°10′22″E
- System: MTR rapid transit station
- Owner: KCR Corporation
- Operator: MTR Corporation
- Line: East Rail line
- Platforms: 3 (1 island platform and 1 side platform)
- Tracks: 3
- Connections: Bus, minibus

Construction
- Structure type: on embankment
- Platform levels: 1
- Accessible: Yes

Other information
- Station code: MKK

History
- Opened: 1 October 1910; 115 years ago
- Rebuilt: 4 May 1982; 44 years ago
- Electrified: 6 May 1982; 44 years ago
- Former names: Yaumati, Mong Kok

Key dates
- 1910: Station opens as Yaumati
- 1969: Renamed to Mong Kok
- 1982: Station is rebuilt
- 2007: Renamed to Mong Kok East on the day of the MTR-KCR merger

Services
Preceding station	MTR	Following station
Hung Hom towards Admiralty	East Rail line	Kowloon Tong towards Lo Wu or Lok Ma Chau
Terminus	East Rail line Some rush hour trips	Kowloon Tong towards Lo Wu or Lok Ma Chau

Former services
Preceding station	KCR	Following station
Hung Hom towards Kowloon	KCR British section	Sha Tin towards Lo Wu
Track layout
Location
- Location within MTR Location within Hong Kong urban core

Mong Kok East station – formerly Mong Kok railway station (1969-2007) and Yaumati railway station (1910-1969) (during KCR period) – is a station on Hong Kong's East Rail line. The station's livery is forest green. Only out-of-system interchange is available with Kwun Tong line and Tsuen Wan line at Mong Kok station via a footbridge. The station is connected to Grand Century Place, a large shopping mall.

The station is within walking distance of Mong Kok station, but there are no direct paths linking the stations; passengers wishing to transfer between the stations must use above-ground roads or transfer at Kowloon Tong.

== History ==
The station, initially named Yaumati, was constructed on 1 October 1910 to cope with the opening of the British Section of Kowloon–Canton Railway. Yaumati was an old romanization of Yau Ma Tei, which is rarely used today. The station was renamed Mong Kok on 31 December 1968 on the grounds that it was actually in Mong Kok District.

In 1983, the station was rebuilt. A temporary station was in use just to the south (towards Hung Hom) during reconstruction. After the takeover of KCR operations by the MTR Corporation on 2 December 2007, the station was renamed to Mong Kok East. Before the MTR–KCR merger, this station shared a name with the separate Mong Kok station on the Tsuen Wan and Kwun Tong lines.

== Station layout ==
Platform 1 is the terminus platform for some southbound trains during peak hours and the train will return northbound towards Lo Wu or Lok Ma Chau. The platforms are curved and the platform gap is relatively large compared to other MTR stations.

-	overlaying properties	Grand Century Place
M	Mezzanine	staff only area, restaurant (MX Fastfood)
C	Concourse	exits, a transport interchange, customer service centre, toilets, shops, vending machines, automated teller machines
P Platforms	Platform 1	East Rail line towards Lo Wu or Lok Ma Chau (Kowloon Tong) → ← East Rail line terminating trains, alighting only (some rush-hour trips)
P Platforms	island platform
P Platforms	Platform 2	East Rail line towards Lo Wu or Lok Ma Chau (Kowloon Tong) →
P Platforms	Platform 3	← East Rail line towards Admiralty (Hung Hom)
P Platforms	Side platform

== Exits ==
- A: Government Offices Carpark
- B: Mongkok Government Offices
- C: Sai Yee Street
- D: MOKO (Grand Century Place)
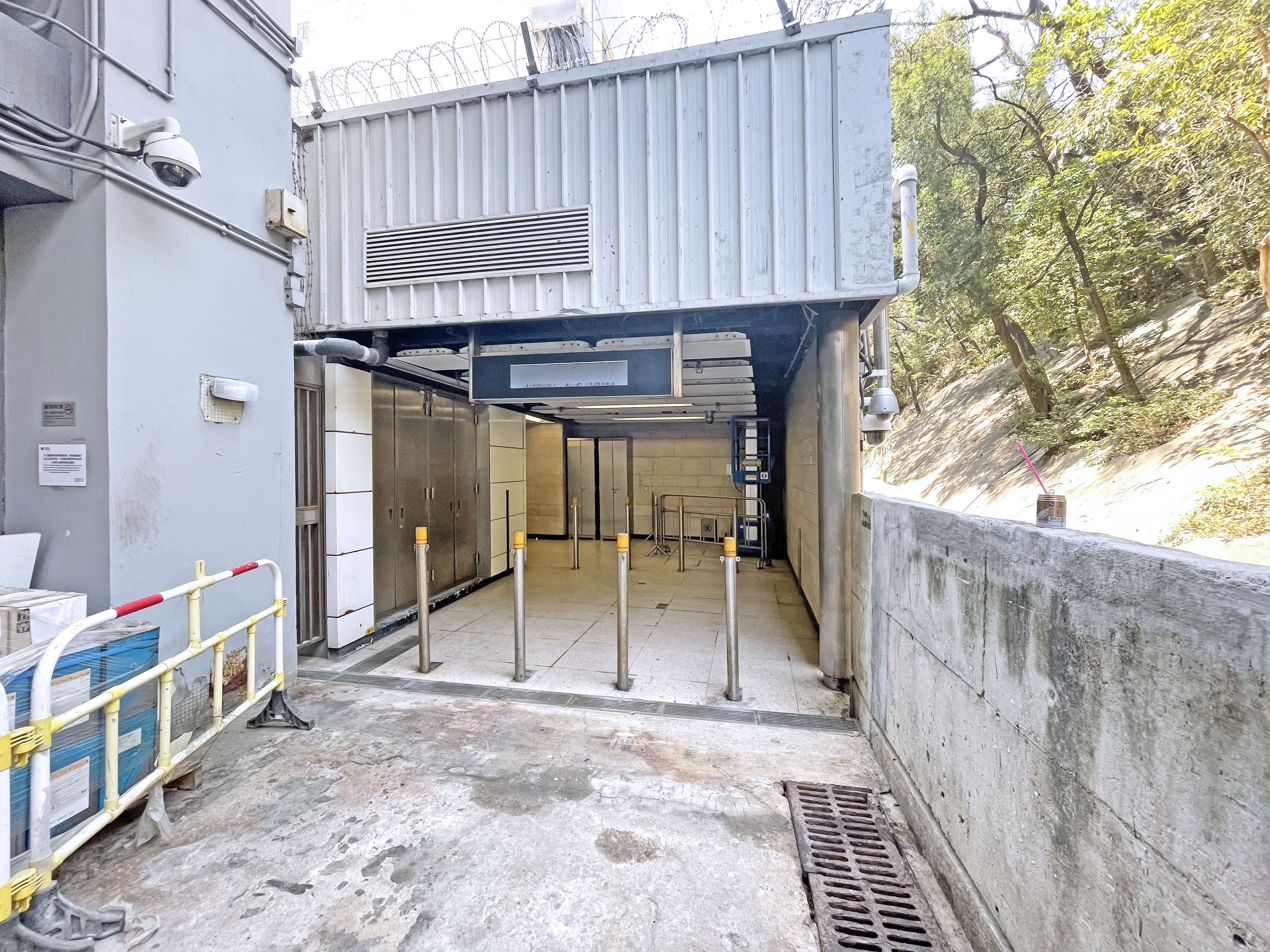
Exit A

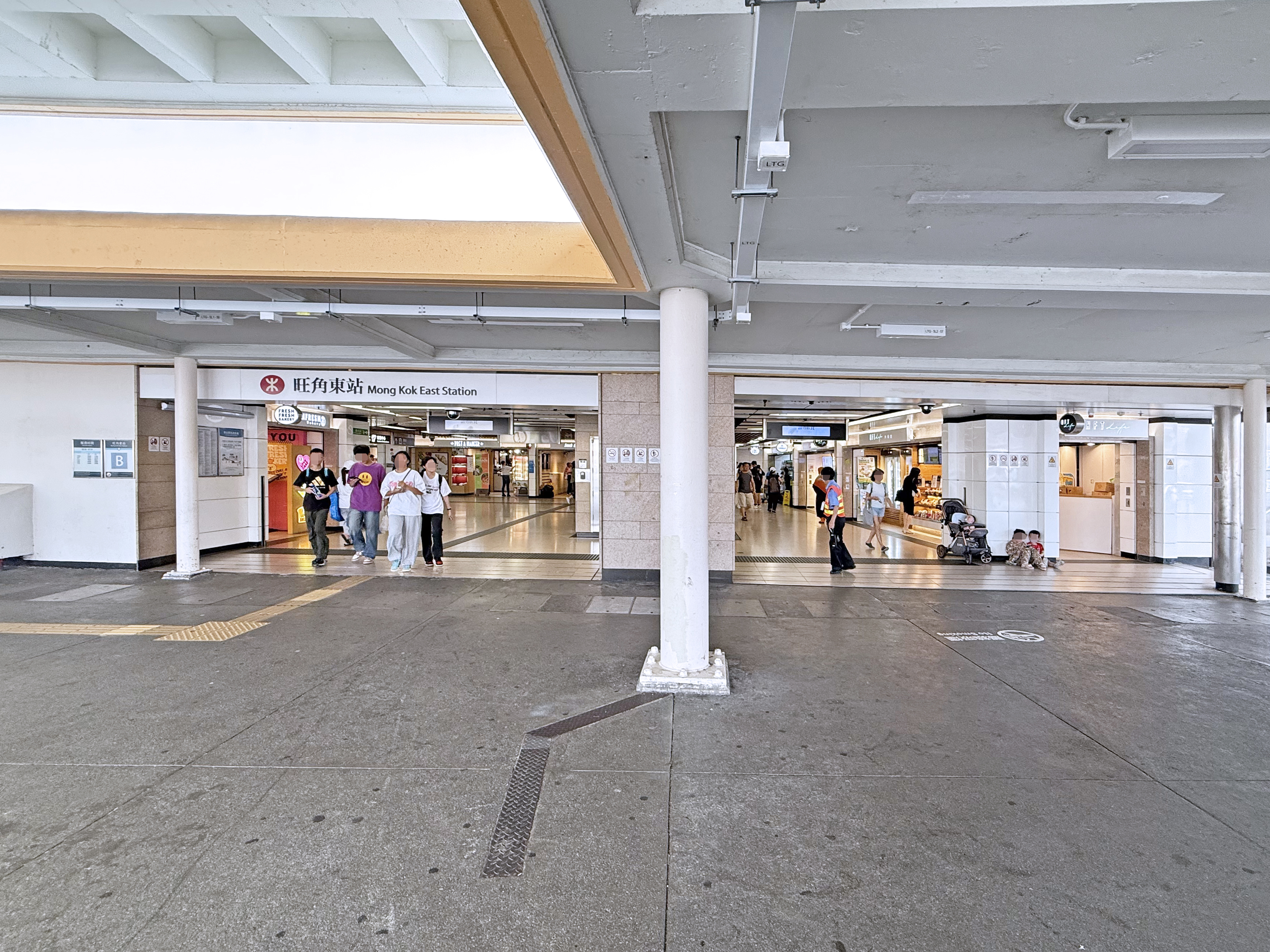
Exit B

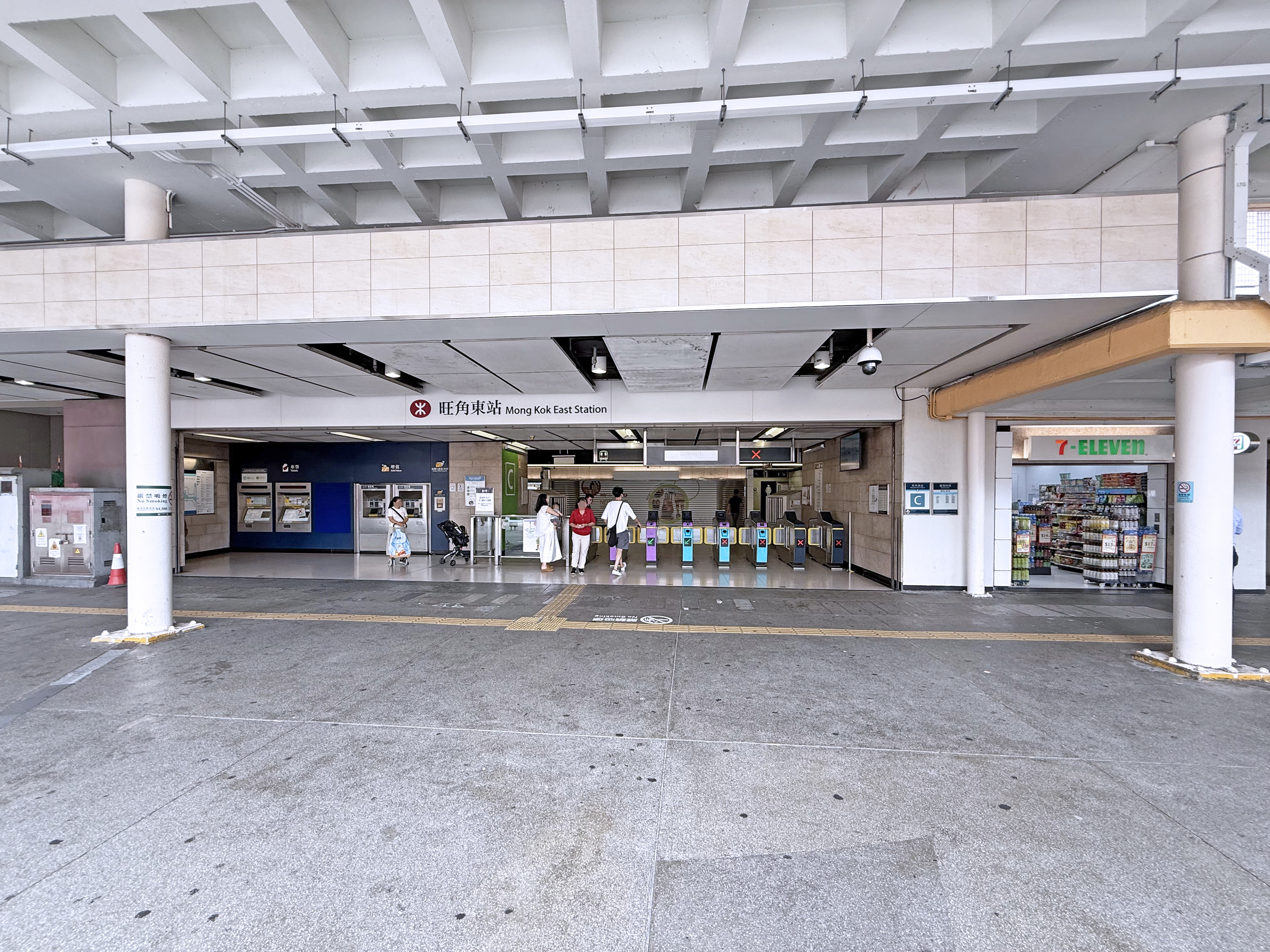
Exit C

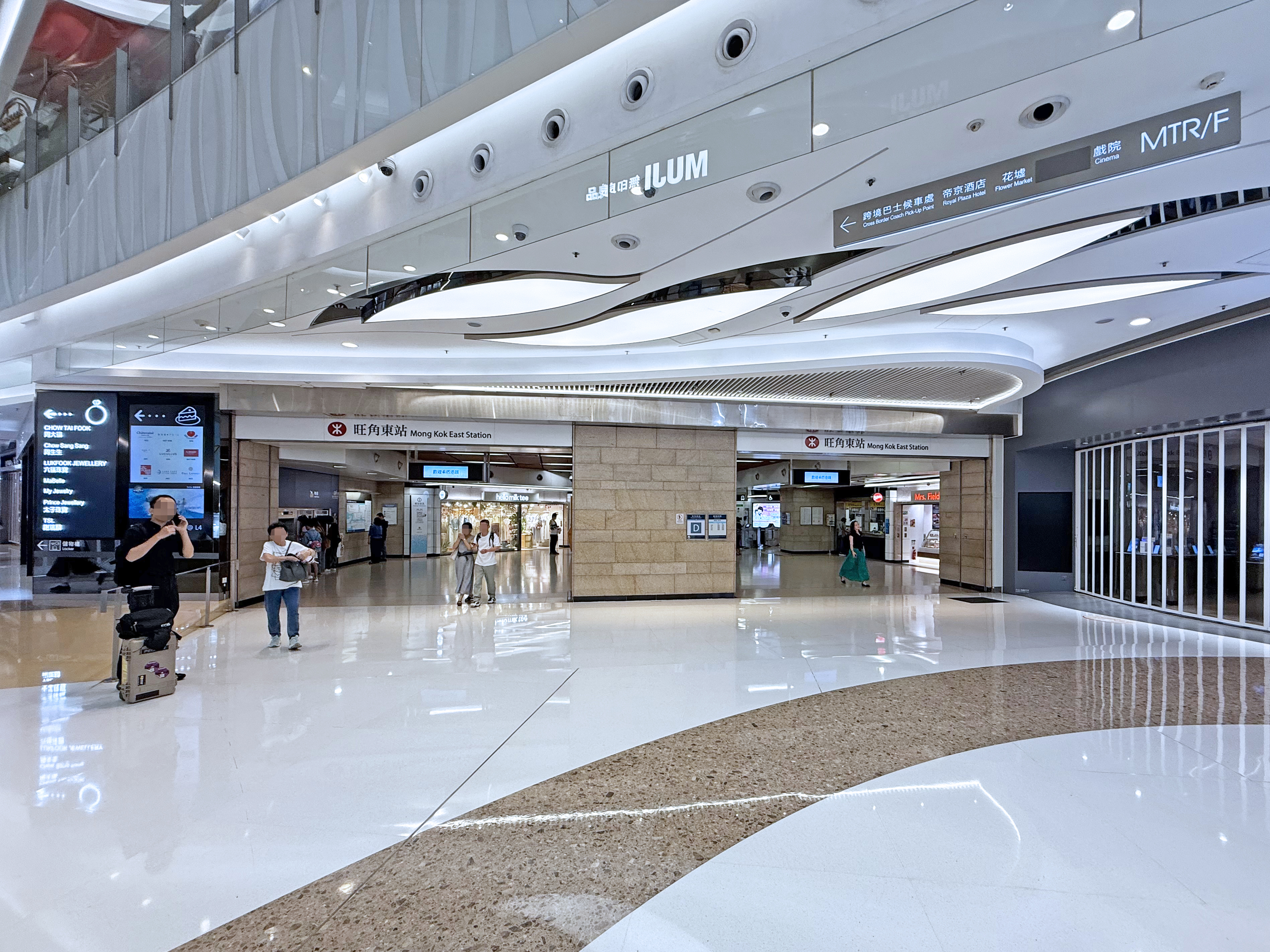
Exit D

== Nearby landmarks ==
- MOKO (Grand Century Place)
- Royal Plaza Hotel
- Yuen Po Street Bird Garden
