= MKK (disambiguation) =

MKK is mitogen-activated protein kinase kinase, an enzyme.

MKK may also refer to:

- Malmö KK, Swedish swim team from Malmö
- Main-Kinzig-Kreis, a kreis (district) in Hesse, Germany
- MKK, the IATA Airport code for Molokai Airport on the island of Molokai, Hawaii
- Mong Kok East station, Hong Kong; MTR station code MKK
- Museum für Kunst und Kulturgeschichte in Dortmund, Germany
- The Morgan-Keenan-Kellman system, a stellar classification system also known as Yerkes spectral classification

== See also ==
- MK2 (disambiguation)
- MKKS
