= MK =

MK or mk may refer to:

== In arts, entertainment and media ==
=== Fictional characters ===
- Moon Knight, a Marvel Comics superhero
- M.K., an Into the Badlands (TV series) character
- Mary Katherine "M.K." Bomba, the protagonist in Epic (2013 film)

=== Video games ===
- Makai Kingdom: Chronicles of the Sacred Tome, a tactical role-playing game
- Mario Kart, a series of racing video games developed and published by Nintendo featuring characters from the Mario franchise
- Mortal Kombat, a series of fighting video games developed and published by Midway Games

=== Other media ===
- MK (channel), a defunct South African television channel
- Moskovskij Komsomolets, a Russian newspaper

== In business and finance ==
- Mark (designation), a designation used to identify versions of a product or item, e.g. Mk. II
- Finnish markka (symbol: mk), defunct currency of Finland

== Businesses and organizations ==
- Mary Kay, a multi-level marketing company
- MK Airlines, a British cargo airline
- MK Electric, an English manufacturer of electrical goods
- MK Group, a Serbian holding company
- Air Mauritius, a Mauritian passenger airline (IATA designation: MK)
- Michael Kors (brand), American fashion brand
- Mysore Kirloskar, an Indian manufacturer of lathes, part of the Kirloskar Group
- Montreal Kosher, known as MK, a Canadian kosher certification agency
- Morrison-Knudsen, an engineering and construction firm

== Languages ==
- Macedonian language (ISO 639 digram "mk")
- Middle Korean (10th–16th centuries)

== People ==
- MK Nobilette, also Emkay, (born 1994), American singer
- M. K. Asante (born 1982), American author, filmmaker and professor
- MK (DJ) (Marc Kinchen), American house-music producer
- Mark Knopfler (born 1949), English musician, co-founder of Dire Straits
- Michael Kors (born 1959), American fashion designer
- M. K. Mubanga, Zambian politician
- mk.gee (born 1996), American indie/alt rock singer and multi instrumentalist

== Places ==
- North Macedonia (ISO country code MK)
  - .mk, the Internet country code top-level domain for North Macedonia
- Magic Kingdom, a Walt Disney World theme park in Greater Orlando
  - Magic Kingdom, Sydney, a defunct theme park in Australia
- Milton Keynes, a city in southern England, abbreviated locally as "MK"
  - MK postcode area - postal district encompassing northern Buckinghamshire and northern Bedfordshire
- Mong Kok, an area of Hong Kong
  - "MK", of "Mong Kok culture"

== In politics ==
- Member of the Knesset, the legislature of Israel
- Umkhonto we Sizwe (Spear of the Nation), an armed wing of the African National Congress (the majority party in South Africa)
- uMkhonto we Sizwe Party (Spear of the Nation), political party in South Africa that broke away from the ANC
- Mebyon Kernow, a Cornish political party in the United Kingdom
- Mahkamah Konstitusi Republik Indonesia, Indonesia's constitutional court.

== In religion ==
- Gospel of Mark, the second book of the New Testament in the Christian Bible
- Missionary Kids, the children of missionary parents
- Mk, a post-nominal title for a monk

== In science, technology, and mathematics ==
- Mark (designation), a designation used to identify versions of a product or item, e.g. Mk. II
- Mk (software), a make replacement in the Plan 9 from Bell Labs and Inferno operating systems
- Mk reference point, an interface of the IP Multimedia Subsystem used to exchange messages between BGCFs in different networks
- Morgan-Keenan (MK) spectral classification, a stellar classification system based on spectral lines
- Megakelvin (MK), an SI unit of temperature
- Midkine, a protein
- Millikelvin (mK), an SI unit of temperature
- Morse–Kelley set theory in the field of mathematics

== In sport ==
- FK Mandalskameratene, a Norwegian football club
- Milton Keynes Dons F.C., a football team in Milton Keynes often shortened to MK Dons

== Other uses ==
- Machinery Technician, an enlisted rating in the United States Coast Guard
- Chrysler MK platform (Jeep Compass and Jeep Patriot)
- Medical kit, a first aid kit

== See also ==
- MKULTRA (disambiguation)
