= MTR Metro Cammell EMU (DC) =

Model of electric multiple unit operated by the MTR

Metro-Cammell EMU (M-Train) CM/CT/I/G/H/Q stock 港鐵現代化列車
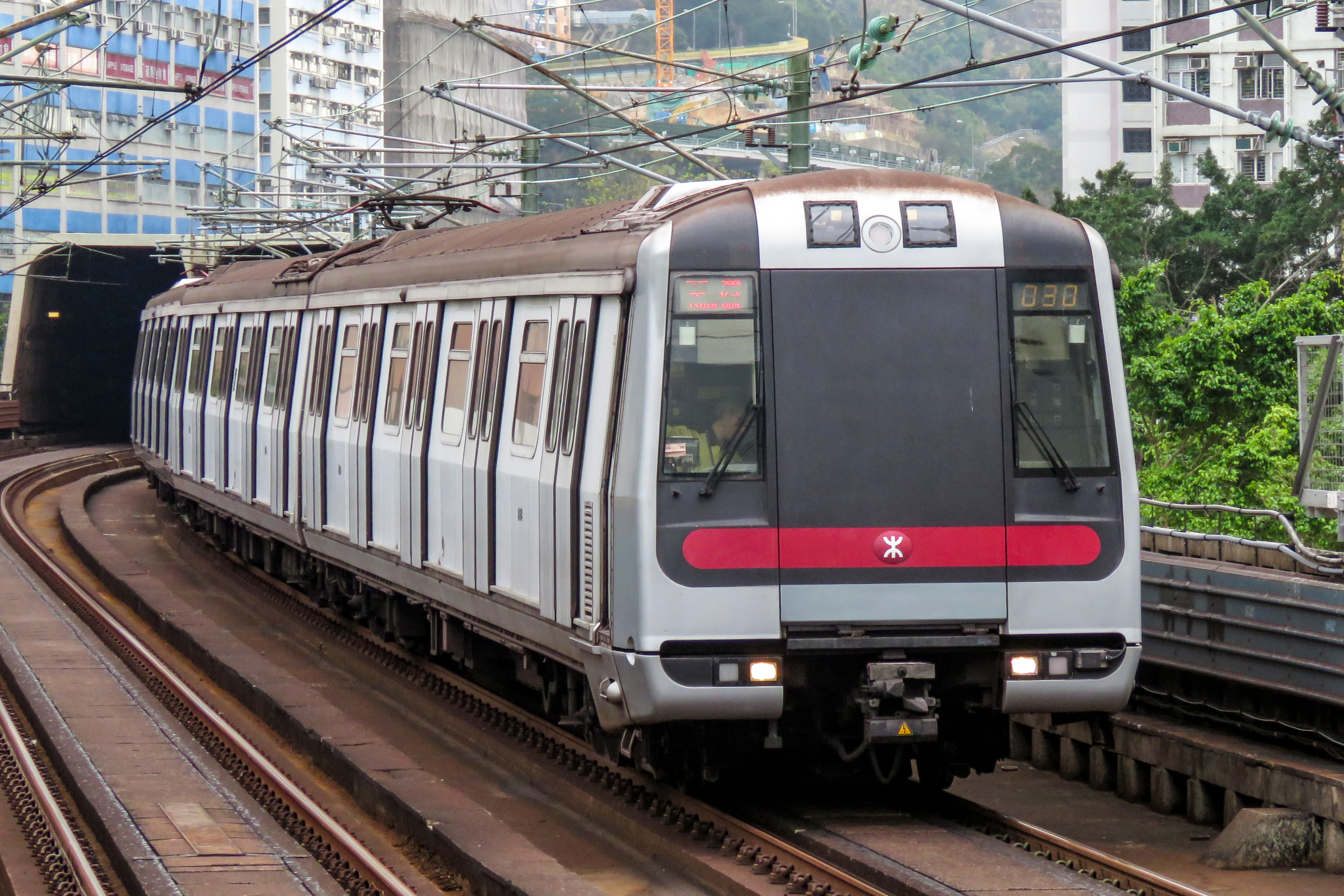
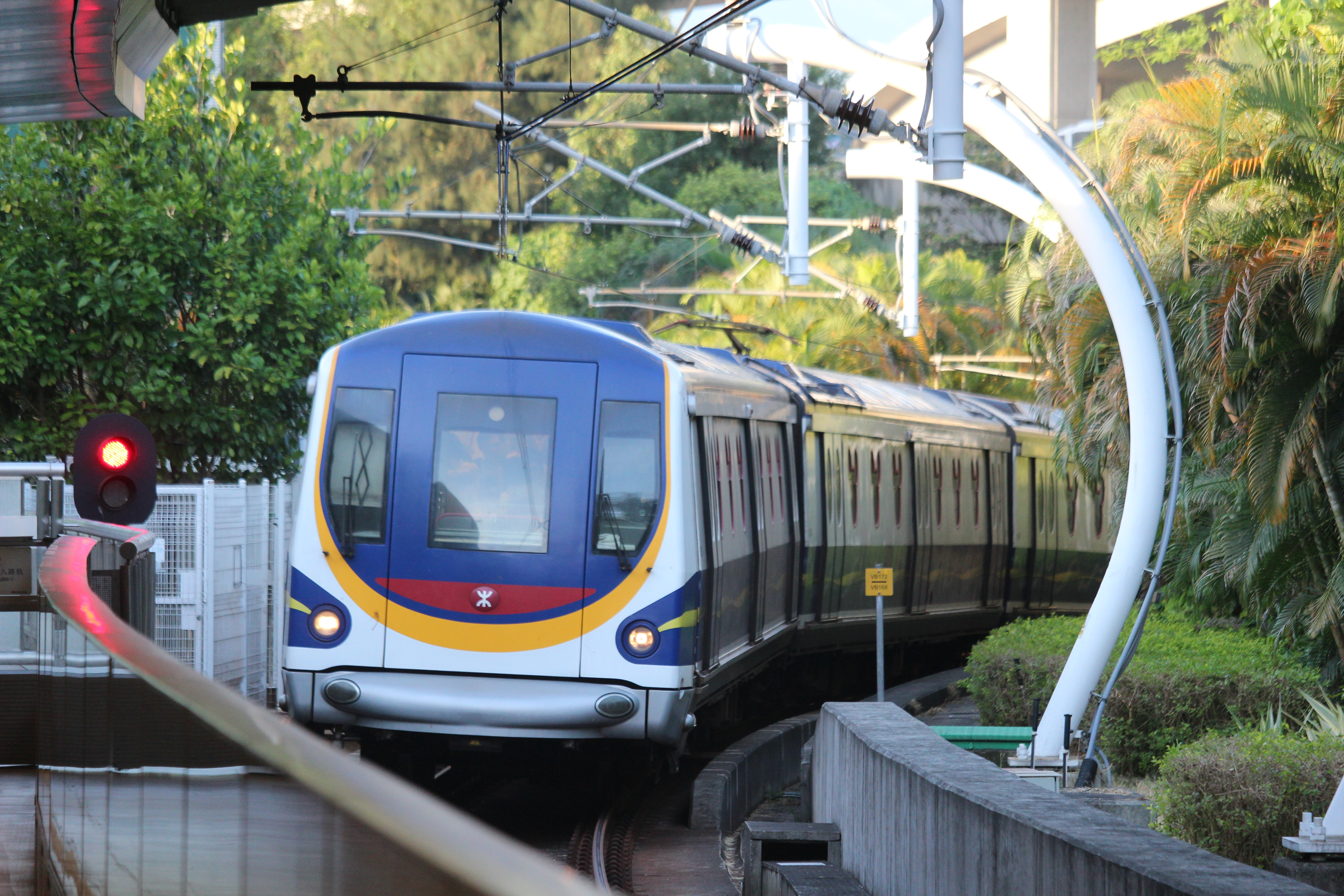
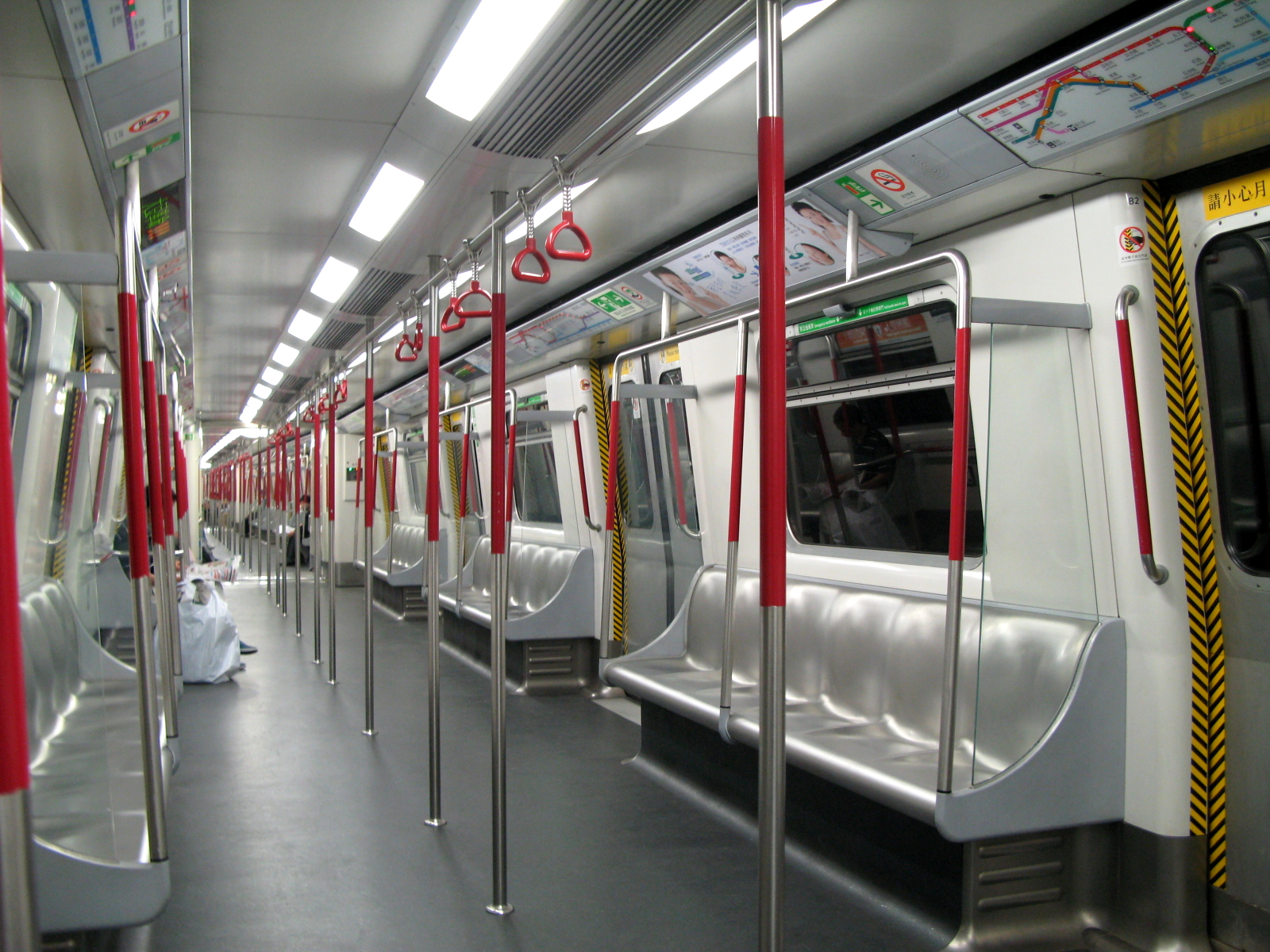
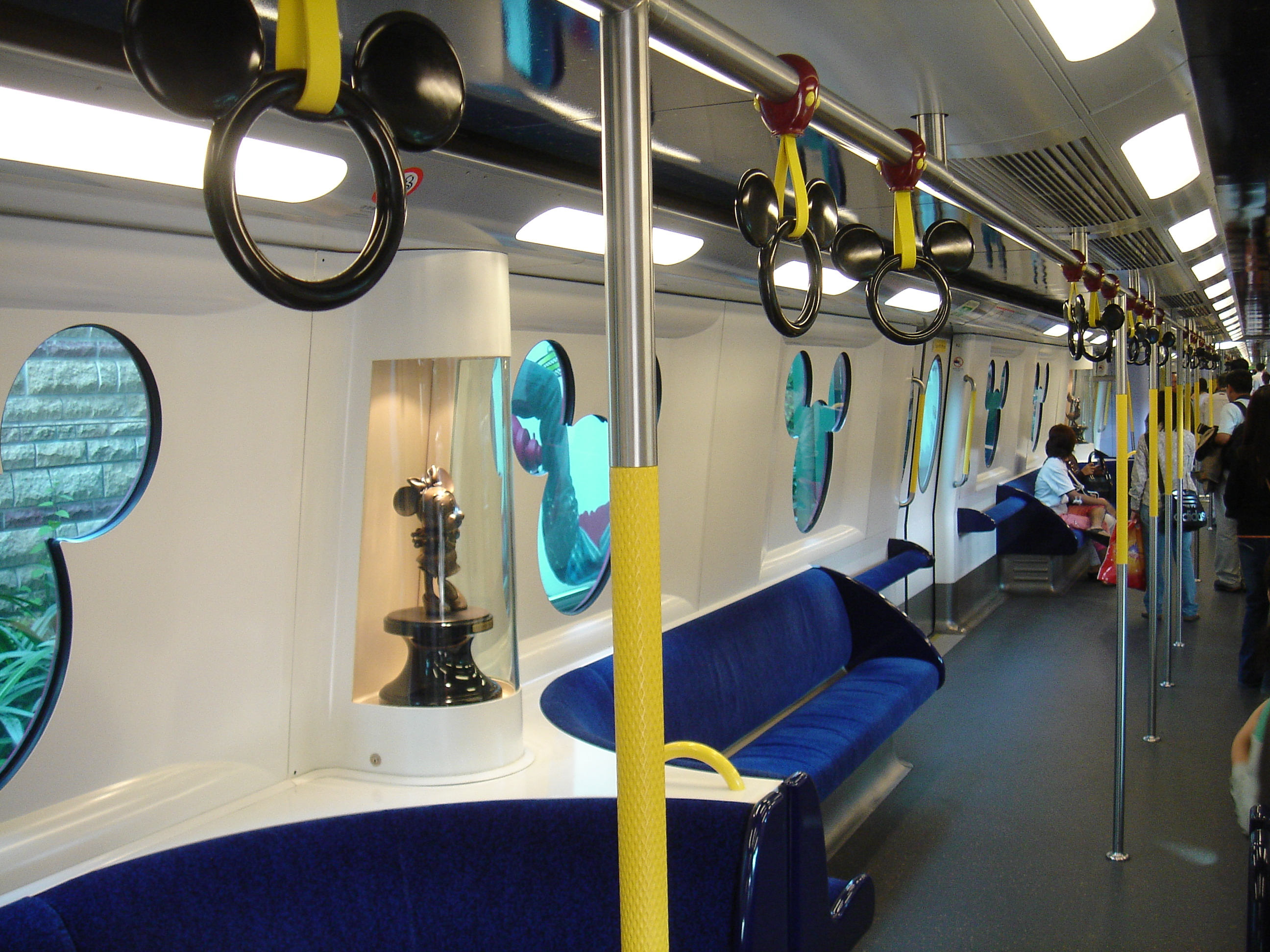
- M-Train approaching Kwai Hing station Disneyland Resort line M-Train entering Sunny Bay Interior of the refurbished M-Train, taken in 2007 MTR Disneyland Resort line train interior
- Stock type: Electric multiple unit
- In service: 1 October 1979; 47 years ago – present (Tsuen Wan line, (Kwun Tong Line), (Tseung Kwan O Line) (Island line); 1 August 2005; 21 years ago – present (Disneyland Resort line)
- Manufacturers: Metro-Cammell and GEC-Alsthom (both later known as Alstom)
- Built at: Washwood Heath, Birmingham, England; Kowloon Bay, Hong Kong
- Constructed: 1977–1997 (Local), 1994 (Disneyland Resort line)
- Entered service: 1 October 1979–1989 (Phase 1 & 2), 1994–1998 (Phase 3), 1 August 2005 (Disneyland Resort line)
- Refurbished: United Goninan (1998–2001)
- Scrapped: Starting from 2022 (urban lines) 2028 (Disneyland Resort Line)
- Number built: 768 cars (95 sets + 6 surplus cars + 3 Disneyland Resort line sets)
- Number in service: 368 cars (46 sets), as of November 10, 2026
- Number scrapped: Regular Service Carriages (47 full trainsets) [other extra 4 are accident carriages]
- Successor: CRRC Sifang EMU (Q-train)
- Formation: 8 cars per trainset (4 and 6 cars formation at initial service) (Local); 4 cars per trainset (Disneyland Resort line)
- Fleet numbers: Axxx, B4xx, Cxxx, Dxxx, P50x, Q50x
- Capacity: 45 seats, 268 standing per car (313 passengers per car, 2504 passengers per train)
- Operator: MTR Corporation
- Depots: Kowloon Bay; Tsuen Wan; Chai Wan; Siu Ho Wan; Tseung Kwan O
- Lines served: Kwun Tong line; Tsuen Wan line; Island line; Tseung Kwan O line; Disneyland Resort line

Specifications
- Car body construction: Aluminum
- Train length: 180.02 m (590 ft 7 in) (Urban lines)
- Car length: 22.85 m (75 ft 0 in); 22 m (72 ft 2 in)
- Width: 3.11 m (10 ft 2 in)
- Height: 3.91 m (12 ft 10 in) (with pantograph folded) 3.7 m (12.14 ft) (without pantograph) (top of air conditioner flush with crest of roof)
- Floor height: 1.1 m (3 ft 7 in)
- Platform height: 1.1 m (3 ft 7 in)
- Entry: Level boarding
- Doors: 5 sets of 55 inch wide doors per side 3 sets of 55 inch wide doors per side ( Disneyland Resort line)
- Wheel diameter: 850–775 mm (2 ft 9.5 in – 2 ft 6.5 in) (new–worn)
- Wheelbase: 2.5 m (8 ft 2 in)
- Maximum speed: Design: 90 km/h (56 mph); Service: 80 km/h (50 mph)
- Traction system: Original (1979–1995): Camshaft resistance control (GEC Traction); Current (1989–present): GTO chopper control (GEC Traction); I-Stock only: RCT chopper control (Mitsubishi Electric)
- Traction motors: 85 kW (114 hp) DC series-wound motors (GEC Traction G313 AZ on stock except I-Stock, GEC Traction G313 BZ on Disneyland Resort line stock, Mitsubishi Electric MB-518-AR on I-Stock)
- Transmission: WN Drive
- Acceleration: Original:1.3 m/s^{2} (4.3 ft/s^{2}) with 8 Motor Coach; Current:1.0 m/s^{2} (3.3 ft/s^{2}) with 2 Trailer Car.
- Deceleration: 1.0 m/s^{2} (3.3 ft/s^{2}) (service); 1.4 m/s^{2} (4.6 ft/s^{2}) (emergency)
- Electric systems: 1,500 V DC catenary
- Current collection: Pantograph
- Bogies: Duewag SF2100
- Braking system: WABCO Regenerative blend with air brake
- Safety systems: 1979–1996: Westinghouse Brake and Signal Company BlockWork ATP Fixed-block ATP with subsystems of ATC and ATO GoA 2 (STO), Since 1996: Tsuen Wan line 1997: Island line: GEC-Alsthom SACEM ATP and ATS, with GoA 2 ATO; 2002: Kwun Tong line: Siemens Mobility SACEM with ATC; Disneyland Resort line: Thales SelTrac® CBTC ATC with subsystems of ATO GoA 4 (STO), ATP, NetTrac ATS, CBI; Since 2026: Tsuen Wan line: Alstom - Thales JV Advanced Seltrac CBTC
- Coupling system: BSI multi-function couplers on ends Semi-permanent couplers between carriages
- Track gauge: 1,432 mm (4 ft 8 3/8 in) (except for West Island line and Kwun Tong line Extension)

The Metro-Cammell EMU (also known as M-Train or Modernisation Train, Chinese: 港鐵現代化列車) is the oldest type of electric multiple unit that operates on the MTR rapid transit railway system in Hong Kong. A total of 768 cars were built by Metro-Cammell (and its successor GEC-Alsthom, later known as Alstom) in England between 1977 and 1997, and refurbished from 1998 to 2001 by United Goninan (now UGL).

== Features ==
=== Urban line stock ===
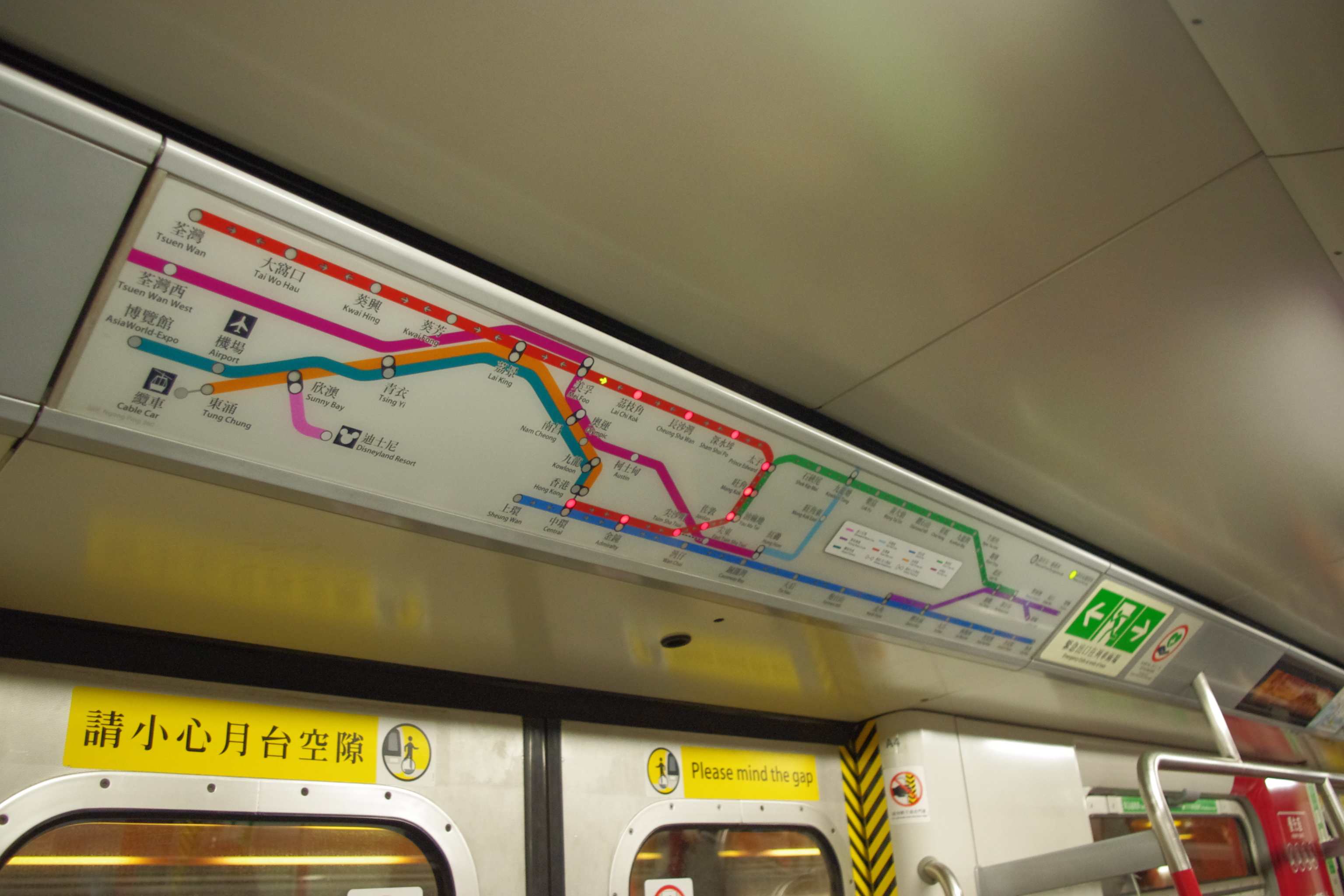
Flashing system map which indicates travelling direction, stopping stations, preferred interchange stations and door opening side on a map of existing MTR routes before 2015

The M-Train, along with the later C-Train, TML C-train, R-train and ex-KCR stock, has five sets of double-leaf sliding doors on both sides of each car, to facilitate rapid boarding and exiting. This is opposed to the K-Train and AdTranz-CAF trains, which use plug doors. They are currently operating primarily on the Tsuen Wan line and Island line but are also operating on the Tseung Kwan O line alongside newer rolling stock. Each car is 3,200 mm (10 ft 5.98 in) width over body panel, floor to rail is 1,100 mm (43.31 in) high, and roof to rail is 3,910 mm (12 ft 9.94 in) high.

A service train has an acceleration of 1.0 m/s^{2} (3.3 ft/s^{2}) (3.6 kilometres per hour per second or 2.24 miles per hour per second), service brake is regenerative blend with air brake at the rate of 1.0 m/s^{2} (3.3 ft/s^{2}) (3.6 kilometres per hour per second or 2.24 miles per hour per second) and emergency brake is air-brake at 1.4 m/s^{2} (4.6 ft/s^{2}) (5.04 kilometres per hour per second or 3.13 miles per hour per second). The maximum speed for the M-Train is 90 km/h (56 mph), which is limited to 80 km/h (50 mph) during normal operation. Trains are also fitted for driverless operation with a single train operator in each train opening and closing doors and monitoring the route. Primary suspension is chevron springs, while the secondary suspension is air bags. Traction system is mostly through GTO chopper control. Each carriage has 45 seats and capable of holding 268 standing passengers, with space for wheelchairs, giving a total capacity of just over 2500 passengers, or approximately 3000 passengers under crush load. At the time of its introduction in 1979, the MTR M-Train EMU was believed to have the highest capacity of any metro car in the world.

Although another set of EMU trains from the same manufacturer operated on the East Rail line, there were some significant differences between the two models. The Metro Cammell EMUs of the East Rail line, which are also known as the Mid-Life Refurbishment Train, were formerly operated by the Kowloon-Canton Railway until being taken over by the MTR in 2007. However, the KCRC retained ownership of the MLR Trains. All 29 MLR trains were fully retired by May 2022 and all 93 M-Trains will be expected to be fully retired by 2029 to 2030.

=== Disneyland Resort line stock ===
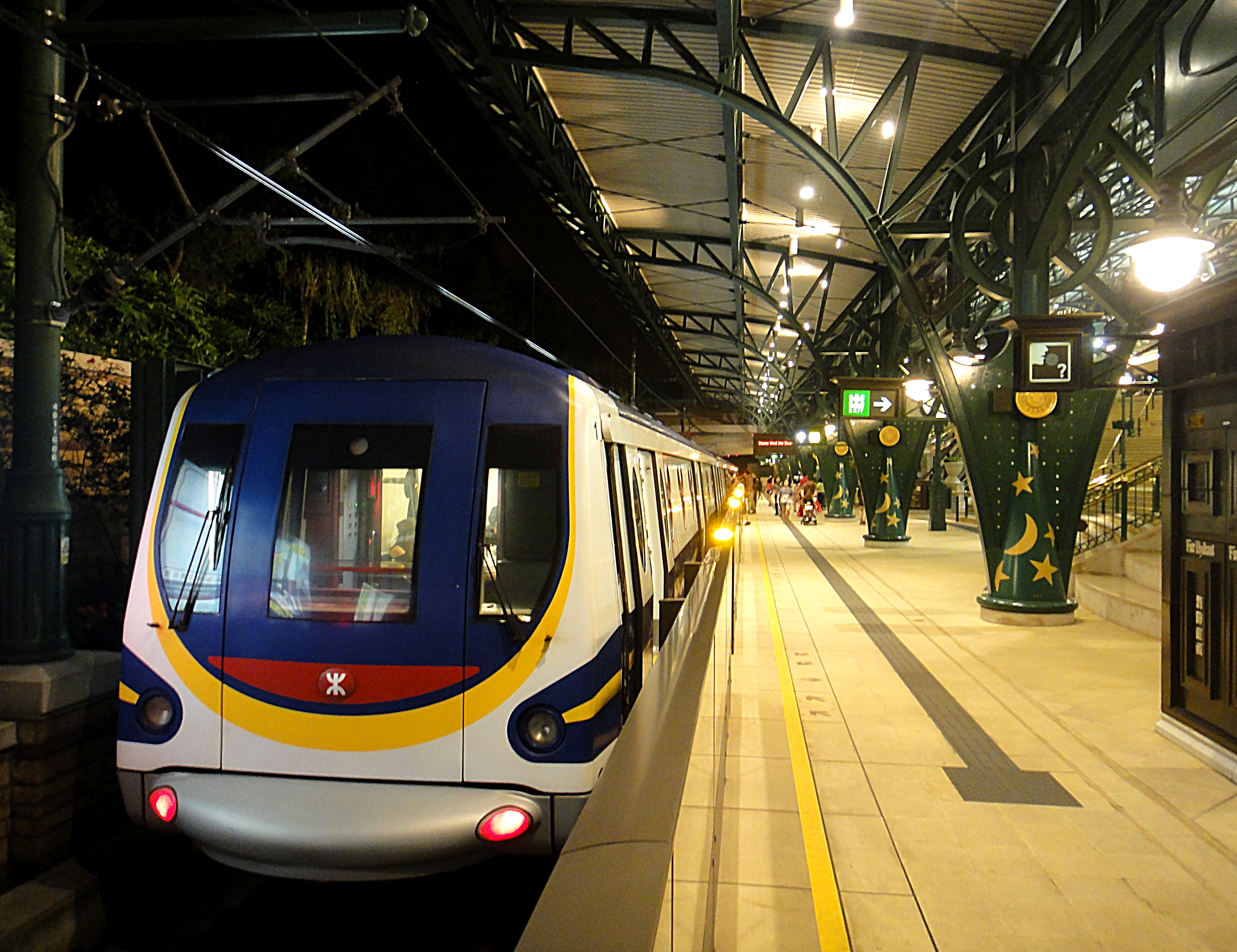
A Disneyland Resort line train at Disneyland Resort station

When the Disneyland Resort line opened in 2005, some second-hand M-Train units originally built in the early-1990s were refurbished and assigned to the line. The MTR designed a new driverless train and produced it by refitting existing M-Trains for the line which is designed with a Disney theme in mind. Statues of well-known Disney characters are included inside of the trains, such as Mickey Mouse and Donald Duck. The windows and handgrips are shaped like Mickey's head.

Units A/C274, A/C281, A/C284, A/C289, A/C291 and B/C490 of M-Train have been assigned to the Disneyland Resort line and completely refurbished into new trains. There are major differences on the Disneyland Resort line trains compared to the main line trains.

- For B/C490, a cab has been added to the B car.
- The train cars have only 3 doors per side, for a total of 6 doors per car.
- The trains use electric doors instead of air-powered doors.

Each car is 3,200 mm (10 ft 5.98 in) wide over body panel, floor to rail is 1,100 mm (43.31 in) high and roof to rail is 3,910 mm (12 ft 9.94 in) high.

A service train has an acceleration of 1.0 m/s (3.3 ft/s) (3.6 kilometres per hour per second or 2.24 miles per hour per second), service brake is regenerative blend with air brake at the rate of 1.0 m/s (3.3 ft/s) (3.6 kilometres per hour per second or 2.24 miles per hour per second) and emergency brake is air-brake at 1.4 m/s (4.6 ft/s) 5.04 kilometres per hour per second or 3.13 miles per hour per second. The maximum speed for the M-Stock is 80 km/h (50 mph), and are normally operated automatically without drivers. However, the operator's cab area has been retained, visible through the glass window at the train ends. Primary suspension is chevron springs, while the secondary suspension is air bags. Traction system is through GTO chopper control.

== Variants ==
Exterior of an unrefurbished M-Train EMU in a publicity photo from 1979.

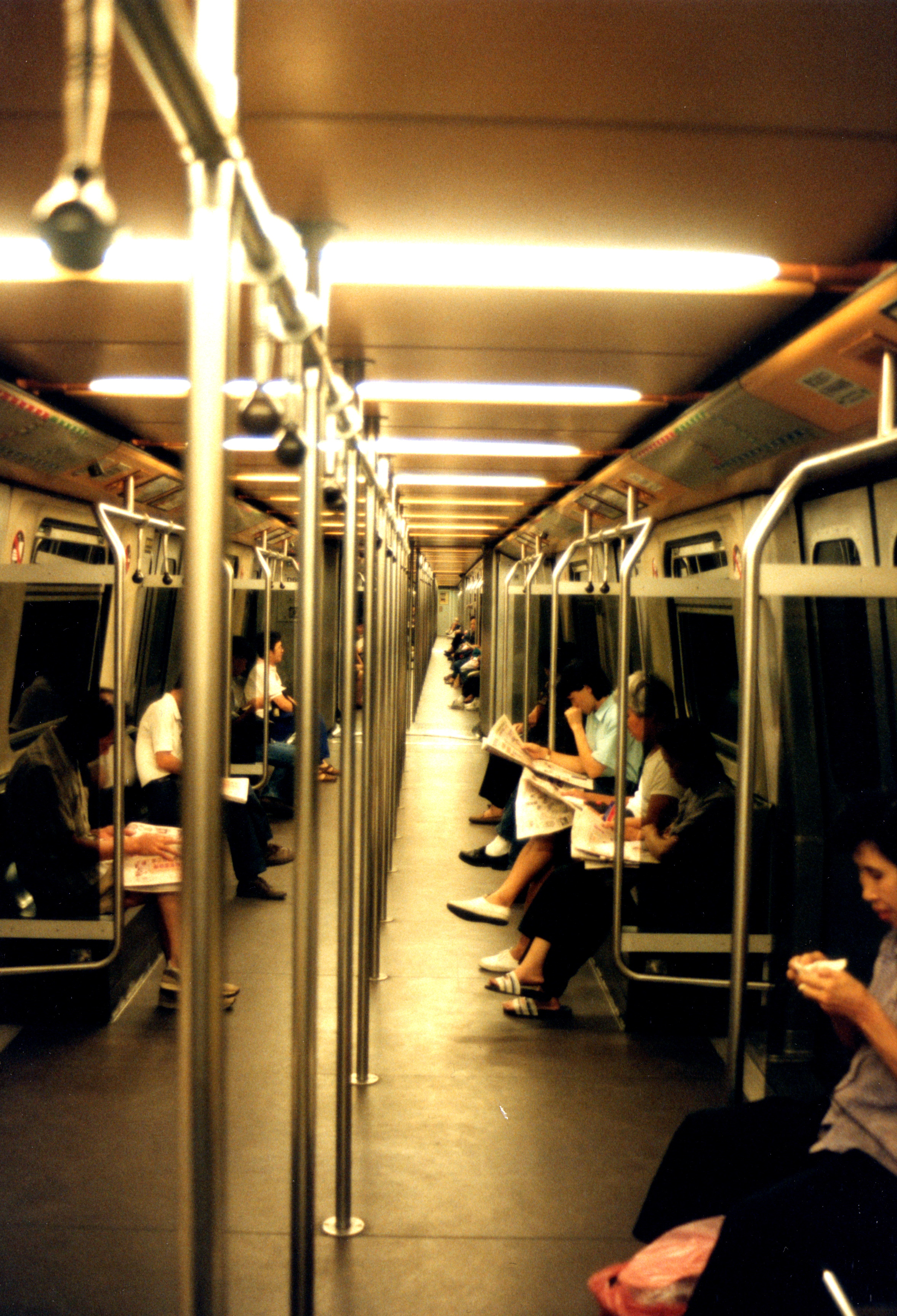
Interior of an unrefurbished M-Train EMU from 1991.

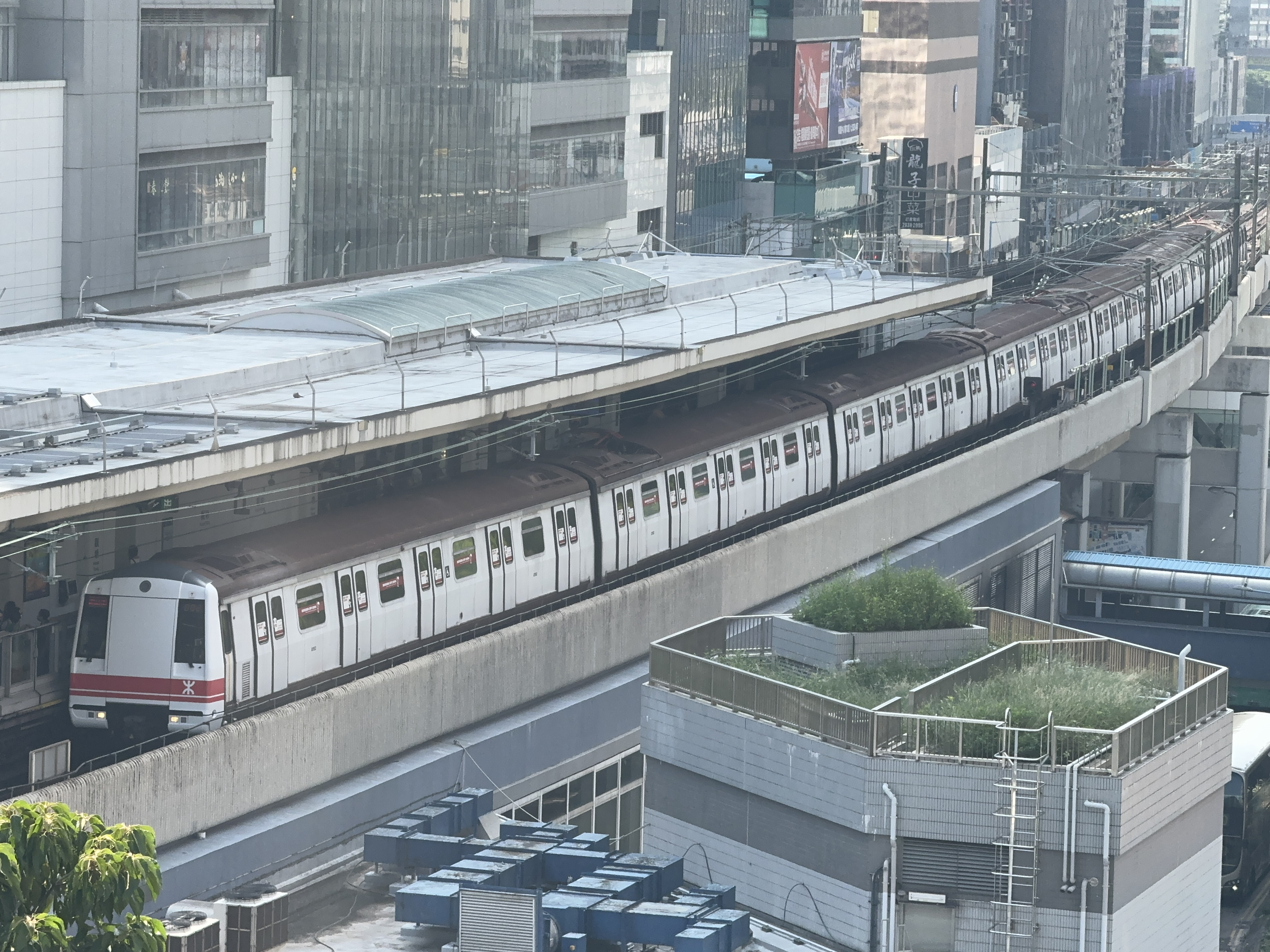
M-Train A161-A162 in a retro-inspired livery, operating on the Kwun Tong Line in August 2024.

M-Train is divided into 6 types of stock. They are the:

- CM-Stock - Modified Kwun Tong line Stock (A/C101-170, B/C401-435)
- CT-Stock - Modified Tsuen Wan line stock (A/C171-247, B/C436-458, 460-479)
- I-Stock - Island line stock (A/C248-256, B/C459)
- G-Stock - Trains for Eastern Harbour Tunnel extension (A/C257-269, B/C480-485)
- H-Stock - Trains for the signalling upgrade (A/C270-291, B/C486-496)
- Q-Stock - All D Cars (See Below) (D601-788)

=== Refurbishment ===
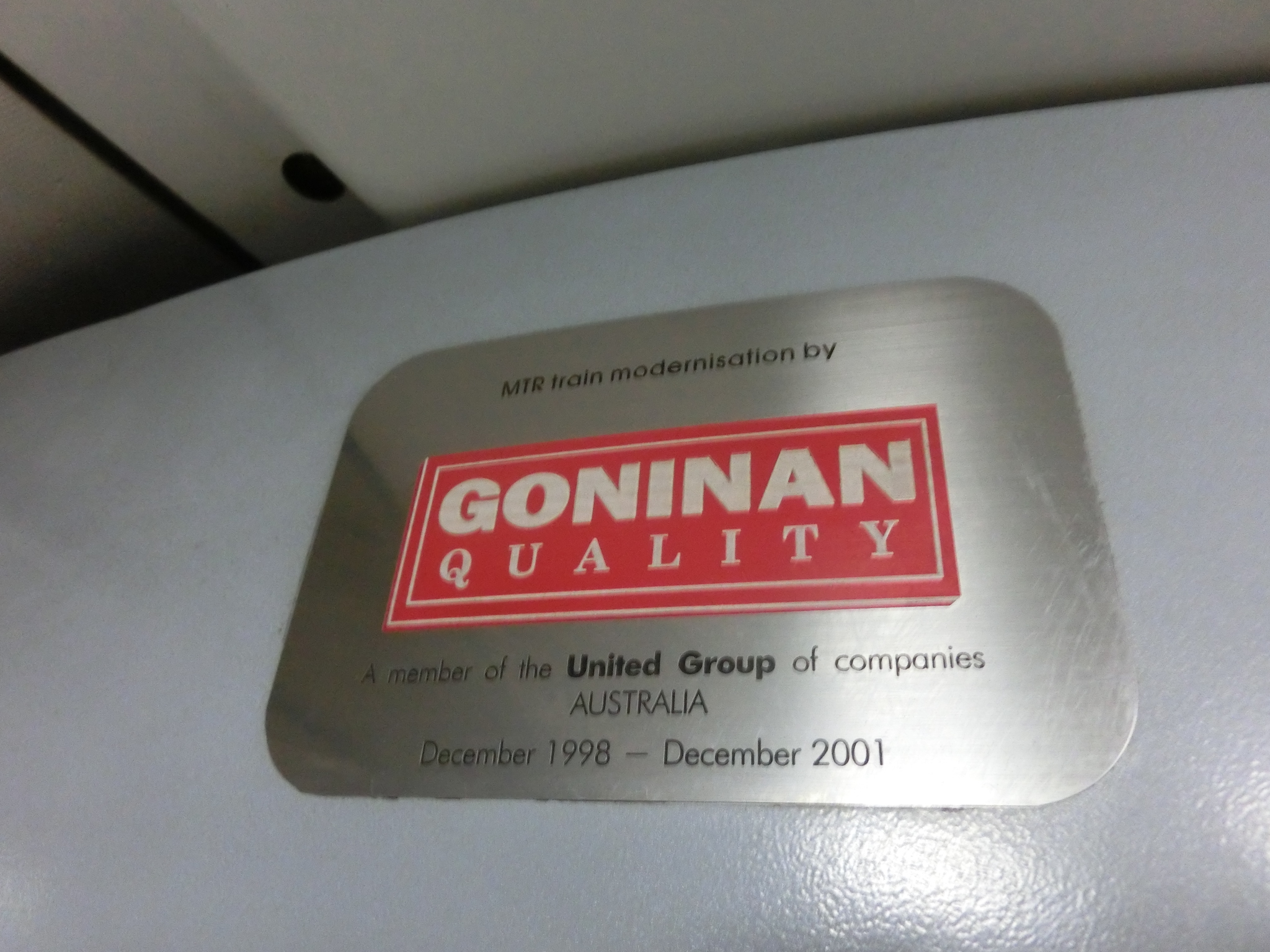
Plaque inside train commemorating the United Goninan refurbishment

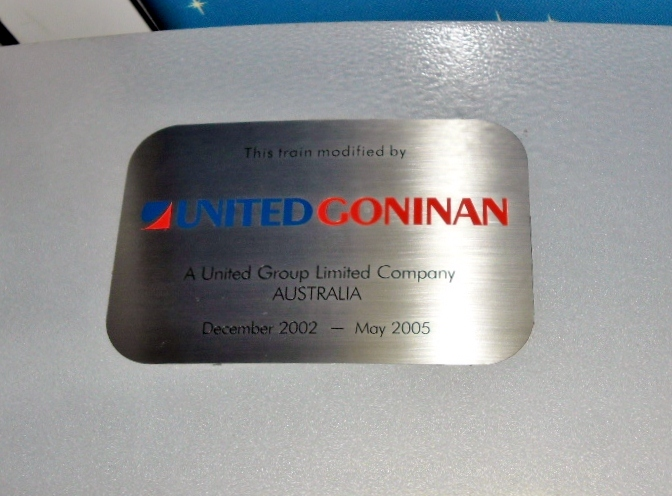
Plaque inside a Disneyland Resort line train commemorating the United Goninan refurbishment.

The whole fleet was refurbished within a period of six years between 1996-2001. These included the redesigning of the trains' fronts which originally featured a red stripe and a white head. The refurbished front has a silver and black coating with new electronic destination and train running number displays. The interior changes include the replacement of lighting and seats, along with installation of new dot-matrix display showing news and weather information, and flashing system maps indicating the station and line that the train is running on. The old black ball-shaped strap hangers were replaced with new red handles. The grab poles are now marked with red in the middle. Some other changes included altering the fibreglass facade on the exterior ends to modernise their appearance, as well as the installation of the advanced digital voice announcement (DVA) and passenger information systems. United Goninan (now UGL) was subsequently awarded a contract to maintain the MTR rolling stock. Some of these new features were not integrated into the M-Trains until late 2001.

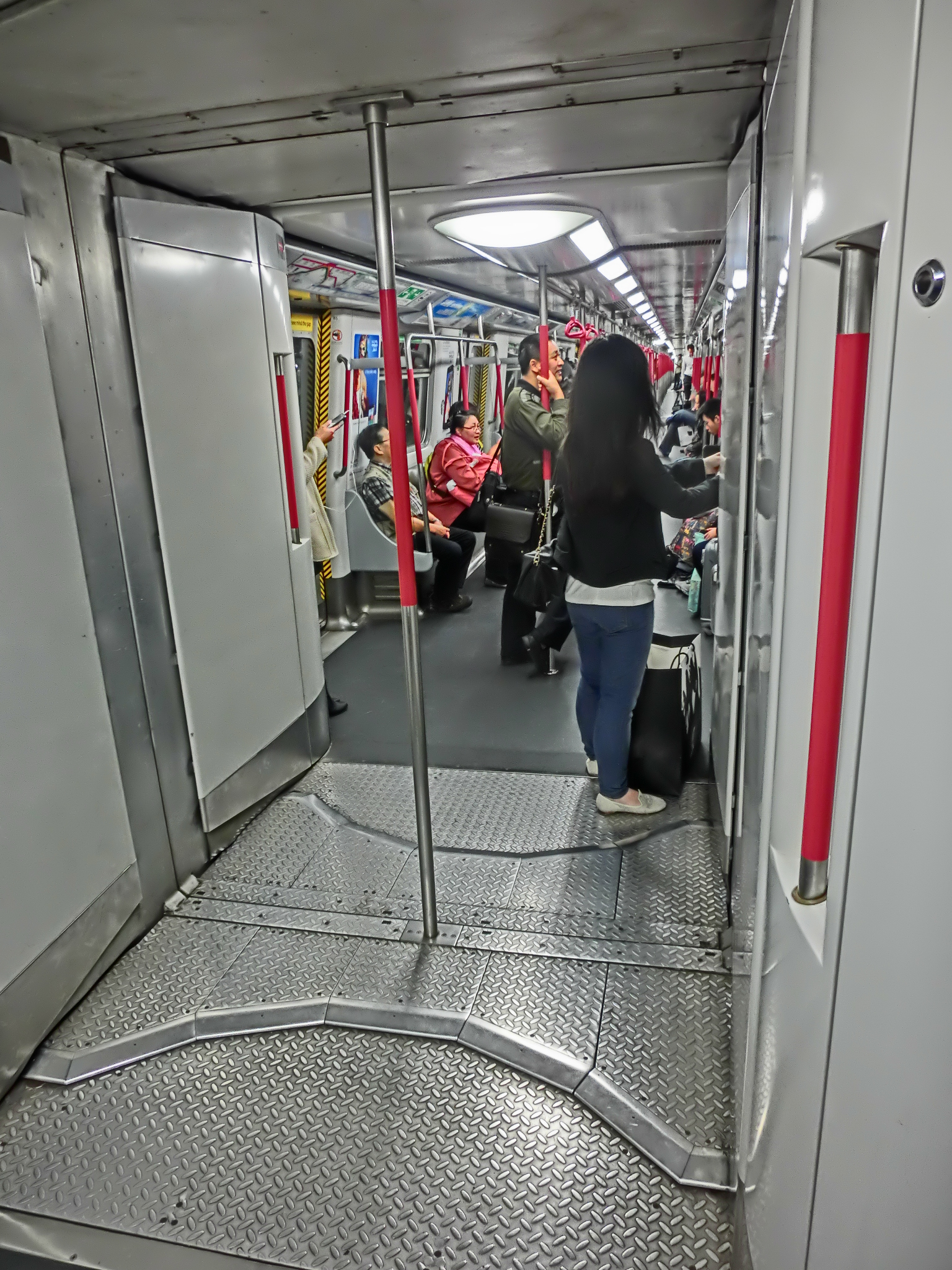
Interior of refurbished M-Train, taken in 2013

Another refurbishment was planned (contract C1066-13E) to update the trains' interior and exterior features to make them feel more modern; however the refurbishment will not take place as plans now call for the M-trains to be replaced by new trains (train set A247/A232 had its handles and grab poles replaced with yellow double-branching poles, although some red poles were retained).

In August 2024, the MTR decorated one of the M-trains in a retro livery similar to its pre-refurbishment appearance as part of its 45th anniversary events. It ran until August 2025, after which it was restored to its original refurbished livery.

=== Tractions and configurations ===
The traction system of M-Stock and T-Stock trains were changed to Chopper from Camshaft in 1992–1995, which gives them the present name CM-Stock and CT-Stock. This was done to keep operating and maintenance cost-effective and to improve performance. All I-Stock trains belong to Island line, excluding A126/A255, which transferred to the Tsuen Wan Line as an I-Stock (of which 3 cars were scrapped as they were damaged beyond repair in 2019, while the other 5 carriages were transferred to Siu Ho Wan Depot and some were subsequently scrapped in 2022).

The configuration of a 8-car M-train in revenue service is (Up track direction) A-C+D+C-B+D+C-A. There was once a type of train with all motor cars A-C+C-B+C-B+C-A (also known as "solid train") but this formation does not exist anymore, although it is possible to configure an M-Train into a solid train. Units A/C274, A/C281, A/C284, A/C289, A/C291 and B/C490 have been assigned to the Disneyland Resort line and completely refurbished into new trains (see below). Additionally, 6-car and 4-car formations existed during the earlier years of the MTR: (Up track direction) A-C+C-B+C-A (6 cars) or A-C+C-A (4 cars).

=== Phases ===
==== Phase 1 ====
When the construction of the Modified Initial System came underway in 1975, bidders for the rolling stock included Australia's Comeng (Commonwealth Engineering), Belgium's BN (La Brugeoise et Nivelles) and ACEC (Ateliers de Constructions Electriques de Charleroi), Canada's Hawker Siddeley Canada and Bombardier Transportation (now Alstom), Germany's MAN SE, and Britain's Metro-Cammell.

The MTRC placed its first train order with Metro-Cammell in July 1976, initially ordering 140 railway carriages. The M-Stock trains (now CM-Stock trains) were the first batch of trains ordered by MTR. The first set, built in 1978, was tested on the test track of the Tyne and Wear Metro in England before being delivered to the Kowloon Bay Depot later that year, with the other sets being delivered between 1979 and 1982. The trains had their traction systems changed from GEC camshaft resistance control to GTO chopper in 1992–1995. They formerly served on the Kwun Tong line and now serve the Tsuen Wan line.

==== Phase 2A ====
The T-Stock trains (now CT-Stock trains) were the second batch of trains ordered by MTR. They were delivered from 1982 to 1985 and also had their traction systems changed to GTO chopper in 1992–1995. They now serve on the Tsuen Wan line.

A/C182's traction systems was changed from camshaft resistance control to RCT chopper control in 1983, and it was changed again to GTO chopper in 1987.

==== Phase 2B ====
The I-Stock trains, the third batch of trains, were ordered by MTRC for the planned Island line in 1981. They were delivered from 1985 to 1986 and serve on the Island line excluding set A255/A126.

B/C459 used camshaft resistance control till 1987. However, all of the other trains use Mitsubishi RCT chopper control, while B/C459's parts were from A/C182.

==== Phase 2C ====
The G-Stock trains were built for the Eastern Harbour Crossing extension of the Kwun Tong line (became part of the Tseung Kwan O line in 2002), they were delivered from 1988 to 1989 and still serve on the Kwun Tong line. However, they moved to Tsuen Wan line starting from December 2017. They were the last batch of MTR M-Trains to be made by Metro-Cammell before being acquired by GEC-Alsthom in 1989.

==== Phase 3 ====
The MTRC signed a contract in March 1992 for 64 new rail cars (48 motorcars, 16 trailers) with an option for an additional 24 carriages. These were delivered by GEC-Alsthom as components, with final assembly carried out at the Kowloon Bay Depot. The H-Stock trains were delivered from 1994 to 1998 and some units were refurbished to serve on the Disneyland Resort line (the remaining units served on the Tseung Kwan O line from 2002 to 2010, and Kwun Tong line from April 2010 onwards. However, they moved to Tsuen Wan line starting from December 2017). 88 cars were assembled locally at Kowloon Bay depot.

==== Q-Stock ====
The first batch of Q-stock D-car (trailers) were ordered as part of Phase 2A trains from 1984 to 1985, cars D601-706 and D707-724; the second batch (Phase 2B, cars D725-752) were ordered from 1985 to 1986; the third batch (Phase 2C, cars D753-763) were ordered from 1988 to 1989, and the fourth and final batch (cars D764-788) were ordered from 1994 to 1998 as part of Phase 3.

Each car is 3,200 mm (10 ft 5.98 in) wide over body panel, floor to rail is 1,100 mm (43.31 in) high and roof to rail is 3,910 mm (12 ft 9.94 in) high.

==== Surplus / retired cars ====
The surplus cars are B/C493, B/C445, A/C112 and A/C126, D736, D737 and D784. Some useful parts on these trains have been cannibalised for other carriages or used as spare parts, so they may no longer be used. Some of these cars were scrapped in August 2022.

The retired / written off cars are A/C131, A/C255 B/C451, B/C459 and D652. B/C459 was taken out of service in 2008 due to motor part issues from A/C254 and lack of Phase 2B parts, so a backup unit B/C404 took over B/C459 on A/C227 - A/C170 (now A/C227 with A/C214 on the Tsuen Wan line). Additionally, D652 and B/C451 were severely damaged in 2019 during CBTC testing between Admiralty Station and Central Station. 3 cars (A/C187 and D659) no longer paired with them and linked with B/C402, D706 and A/C218, to create a new 8-car set (A187/A218) and re-entered service on 4 December 2019.

A255/A126 was taken out of service due to A255/C255 being damaged due to the October 6th Lai King crash. The train was towed to Tsuen Wan Depot and was emptied of passengers on the way, but A255/C255’s bogies were too faulty. Therefore, MTR had A255/C255 scrapped in Tsuen Wan Depot.

The original surplus cars used to be A/C115, A/C145, A/C273, B/C404 and D784.

== Train configurations ==
Cars of M-Train (original)
car type	driver cab	motor	pantograph	car length		number of cars
car type	driver cab	motor	pantograph	mm	ft in	number of cars
A car	✓	✓	✗	22,850	74 ft 11.6 in	191→186
B car	✗	✓	✗	22,000	72 ft 2.1 in	96→95
C car	✗	✓	✓	22,000	72 ft 2.1 in	287→281
D car (trailer)	✗	✗	✗	22,000	72 ft 2.1 in	188
Cars of M-Train (Disneyland refurbishment)
car type	driver cab	motor	pantograph	car length		number of cars
car type	driver cab	motor	pantograph	mm	ft in	number of cars
P car	✓	✓	✗	22,850	74 ft 11.6 in	6
Q car	✗	✓	✓	22,000	72 ft 2.1 in	6

== Replacement ==
All 93 sets will be retired from service around 2022–2030 and will be sent to River Trade Terminal Scrapyard in Pillar Point like the MLRs. MTR had originally planned to replace 78 sets. However, in July 2015, MTR announced that CRRC Qingdao Sifang had won an order to build 93 sets of Q-trains that is set to replace all M-trains by 2027, on grounds that it was "better value for money". In addition, the current signalling system will be phased out in favour of a communications-based train control (CBTC) system. In the meantime, 36 of the M-Trains have been equipped with CBTC equipment, all of which are in service on the Tsuen Wan Line, supplied by Thales, for use on the Tsuen Wan Line as an interim measure while their replacement trains are being delivered.

The Disneyland Resort Line trains will also be replaced by 2028, with MTR announcing that the replacement trains would also be manufactured by CRRC Qingdao Sifang.

The first sets to be withdrawn were involved in incidents in 2019. Full withdrawal began the night of 10 September 2022, and retired trains were brought to Siu Ho Wan Depot for cutting and transporting away to scrapyards in River Trade Terminal near Tuen Mun. Since January 2023, a withdrawal has been made roughly every month with a Q-train entering service simultaneously until June 2025. After a six month hiatus, the process resumed with the withdrawal of set A101/A166 (A101-C101+D649+B430-C430+D778+C166-A166) which was brought to Tsuen Wan Depot for scrapping, alongside all subsequent withdrawals (except set A229/A210, which was scrapped at Kowloon Bay Depot due to rust problems with its pantograph, preventing it from reaching Tsuen Wan Depot under its own power). From April 2026, the process was accelerated to roughly two withdrawals per month.

== Planned export to Singapore ==
In the early-1980s, Metro Cammell and GEC Traction proposed a version of the MTR M-Train EMU for Singapore's Mass Rapid Transit (MRT) metro system (which eventually opened in 1987), alongside several other bidders from France, Canada, West Germany, Sweden and Japan. Although Metro Cammell was shortlisted along with the Swedish ASEA and the Japanese Kawasaki Heavy Industries-led consortium, its eventual loss to the aforementioned Kawasaki consortium in winning what later became Contract 151 for Singapore's first metro rolling stock type was reported to be the relative energy inefficiency of the GEC Traction camshaft traction system then used by all MTR M-trains. Another factor was a measuring error involving the London Underground 1983 Stock during the evaluation phase for Contract 151. The loss of said contract was a massive financial blow to Metro Cammell, who was forced to reduce their workforce by half in August 1984, and was eventually acquired by GEC-Alsthom (now Alstom) in 1989.

== See also ==
- List of driverless trains
