= MTR In-Train TV =

- Type: News and Advertising
- Founded: July 2005; 21 years ago
- Headquarters: Hong Kong, Hong Kong SAR

MTR In-Train TV (Chinese: 港鐵車廂電視) provides Cable TV news and infotainment programmes through LCDs installed on board Hong Kong's MTR trains.

The rates for advertising are 10 seconds for HK$20,000 and the advertising receives over one million views per day.

== History ==
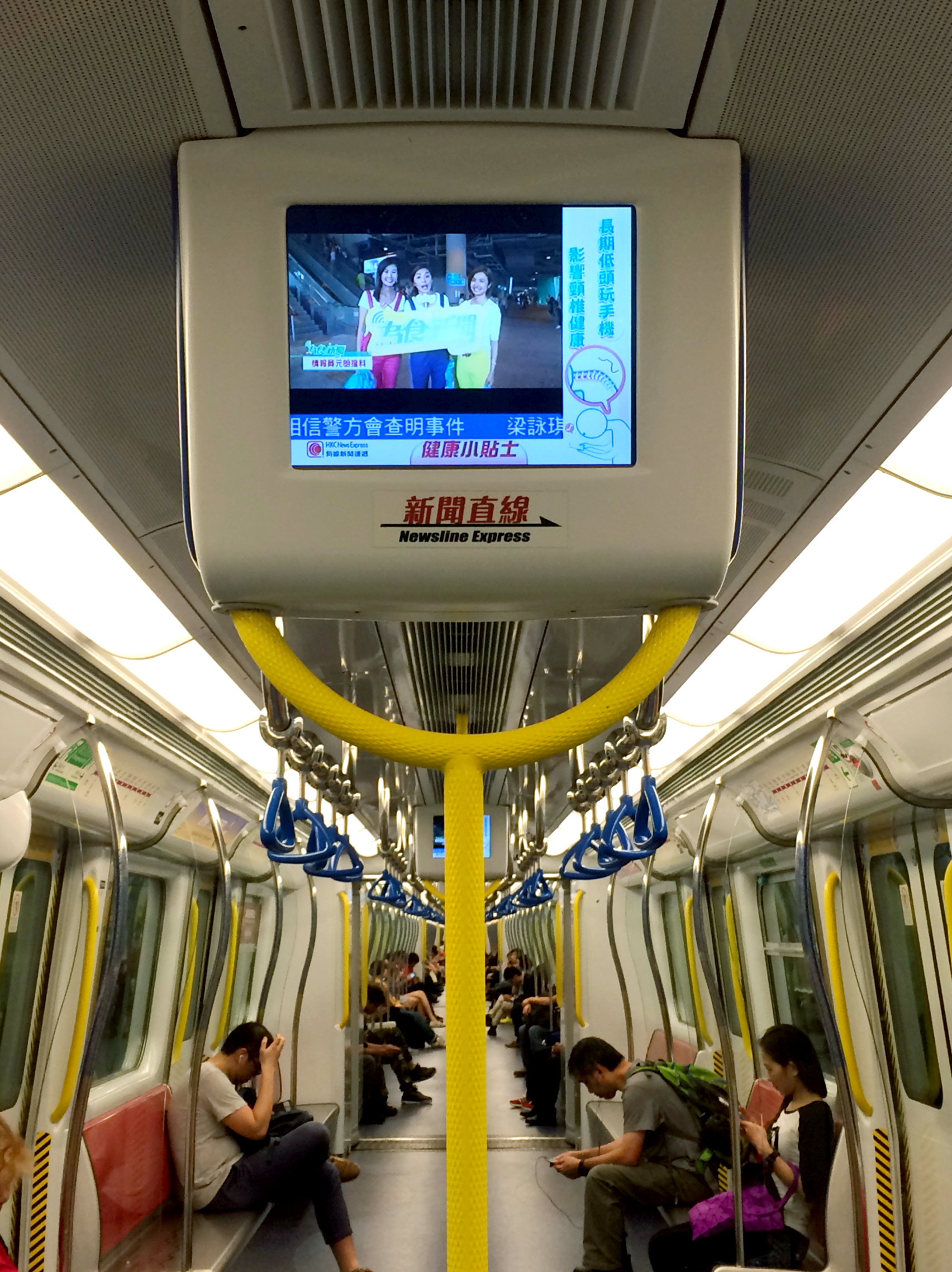
Newsline Express on a West Rail line SP1900

The service was started in July 2005 by the Kowloon-Canton Railway Corporation (then-called Newsline Express (Chinese: 新聞直線)), and at the time was installed in every train compartment running on East Rail line, the then called West Rail line and Ma On Shan lines. Metro Cammell trains of the East Rail line are equipped with wider LCD TVs (22-inch), while the SP1900 trains of the then called West Rail line and Ma On Shan lines had smaller screens (15-inch). The original SP1900 TVs were replaced with larger displays during refurbishment in 2015–2018.

The entry of C-Stock trains into service in December 2011 also launched the Newsline Express service on Kwun Tong line, the first pre-merger MTR line to be equipped, with 22-inch LCD TVs equipped on those trains. South Island line trains followed suit in December 2016, at which point the service was renamed as "In-Train TV". All future train orders, including the R-Train, TML C-Train, and Q-Train, will also be equipped with the service.

The TVs for Newsline Express are sometimes criticized for being too noisy that their broadcasts can even be heard in the quiet car of the train.

== Quiet zones ==
To cater passengers' needs, quiet zones, in which all TV speakers are muted and only train announcements are made, are available on each train. The quiet zones are located on:

- East Rail line MTR Hyundai Rotem EMU: 1st, 6th (part) & 9th compartments for southbound, or, 2nd, 4th (part) & 9th compartments for northbound.
- Kwun Tong line, Tsuen Wan line, Tseung Kwan O line & Island line Q-Train, Kwun Tong line C-Stock EMU & Tuen Ma line trains: 1st & 8th compartments.
