= MTR CRRC Qingdao Sifang EMU =

Model of electric multiple unit on MTR

Q-Train MTR CRRC Qingdao Sifang EMU 港鐵中國青島四方製列車
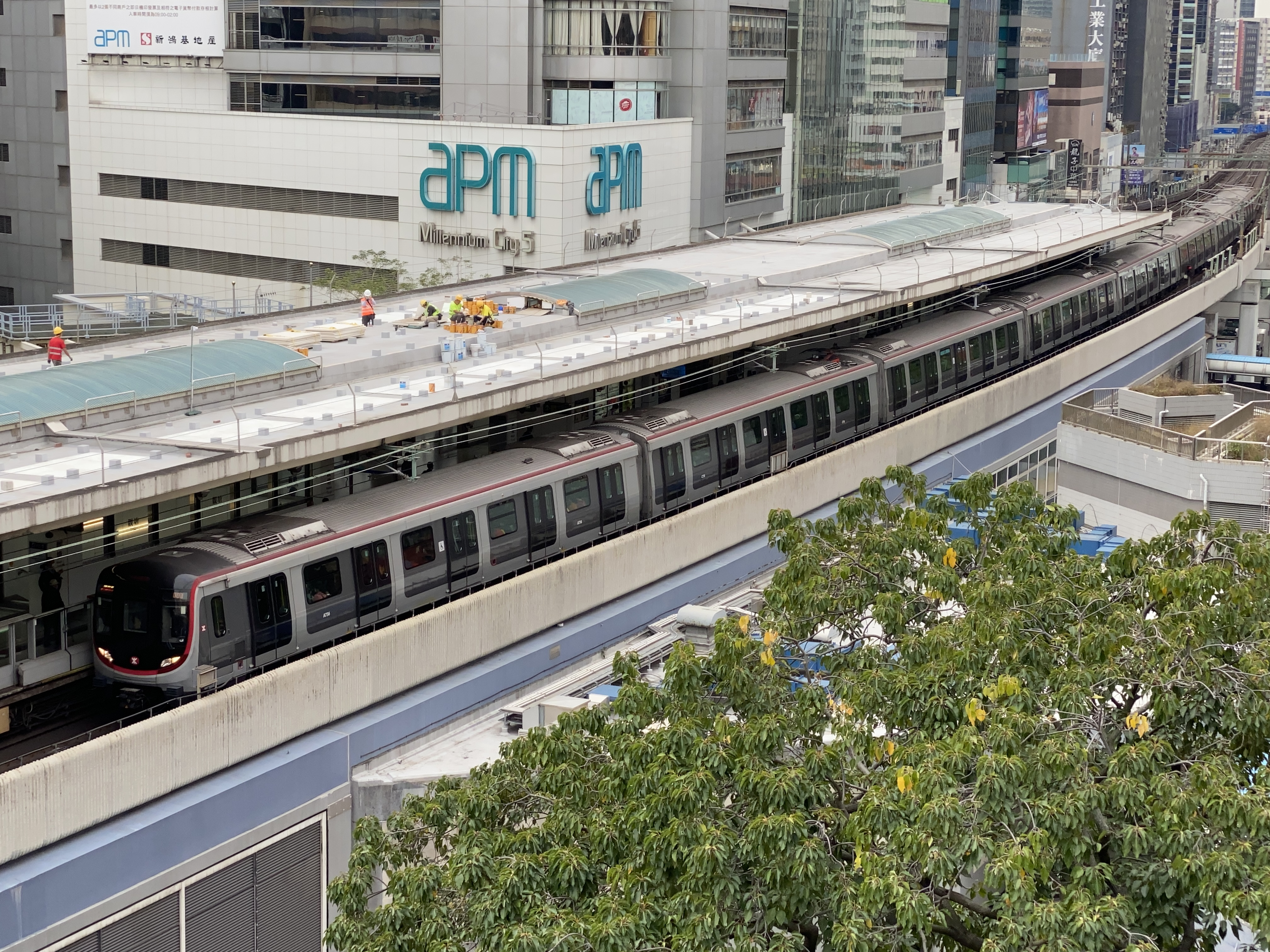
- MTR Q-Train set A755/A756 entering Kwun Tong station on 14 February 2023.

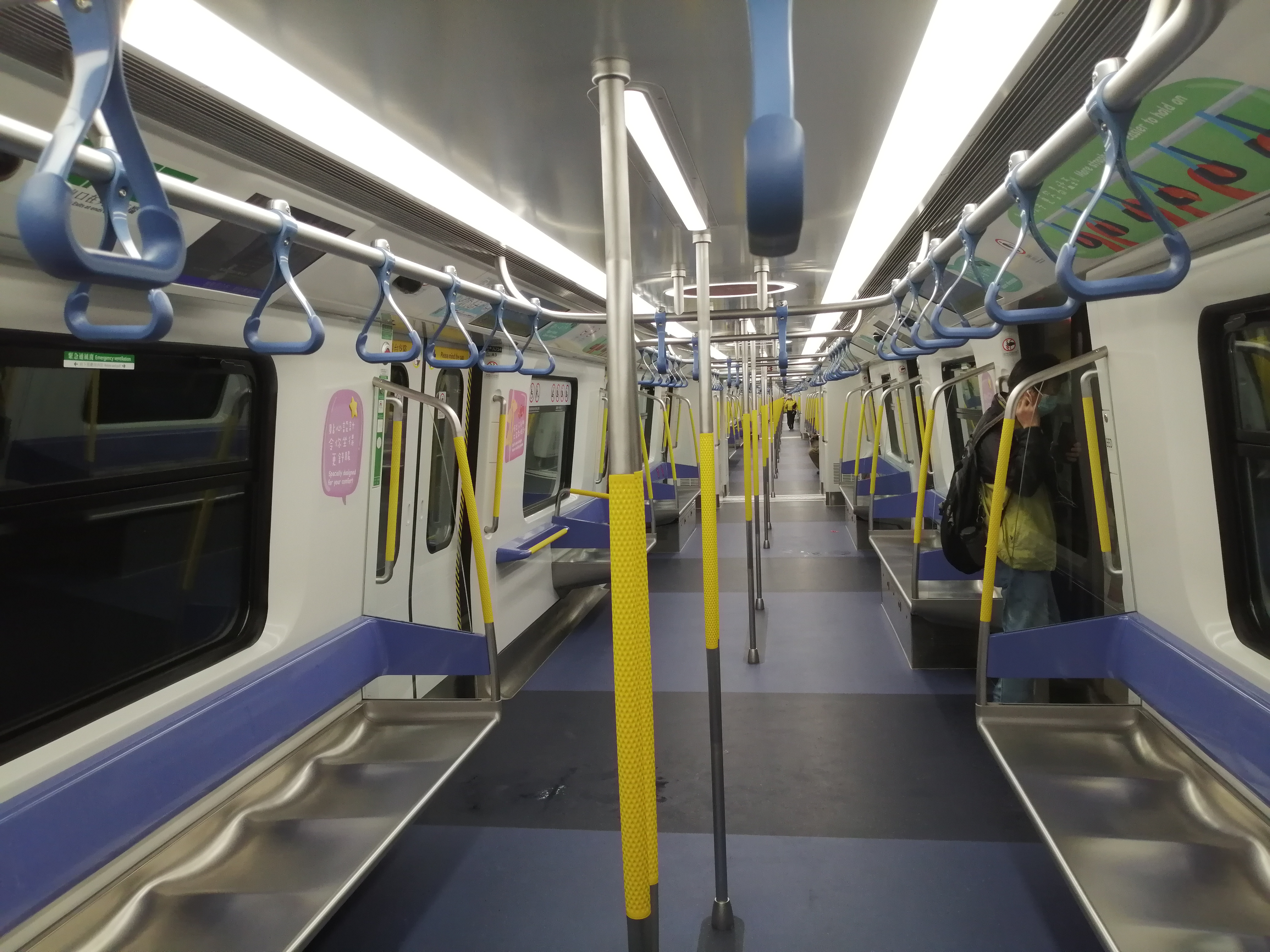
- Interior of an MTR Q-train
- In service: 27 November 2022; 3 years ago – present
- Manufacturer: CRRC Qingdao Sifang
- Order no.: C6014-14E
- Built at: Qingdao, Shandong, China
- Family name: SFM47/47A
- Replaced: DC Metro Cammell EMU (M-train)
- Constructed: 2017–present
- Entered service: 27 November 2022; 3 years ago (Kwun Tong Line); 28 January 2024; 2 years ago (Island Line); 29 March 2026; 7 months ago (Tsuen Wan Line); To Be Confirmed (Tseung Kwan O Line)
- Number built: 92 sets (736 cars)
- Number in service: 54 trains (432 cars)
- Formation: 8 cars per trainset
- Fleet numbers: A601/A602 - A697/A698 & A701/A702 - A785/A786
- Operator: MTR
- Depots: Tsuen Wan; Chai Wan; Tseung Kwan O; Kowloon Bay
- Lines served: Kwun Tong line; Island line; Tsuen Wan line; Tseung Kwan O line

Specifications
- Car body construction: Stainless steel + fibreglass (header)
- Train length: 184.5 m (605 ft 3.8 in)
- Car length: 24.6 m (80 ft 8.5 in) (end cars); 22.55 m (73 ft 11.8 in) (intermediate cars)
- Width: 3.2 m (10 ft 6.0 in)
- Height: 3.7 m (12 ft 1.7 in)
- Doors: 5 sets of 51 inch wide doors per side
- Maximum speed: 100 km/h (62 mph) (Maximum); 80 km/h (50 mph) (service)
- Traction system: Mitsubishi Electric MAP-134-15VD305 IGBT–VVVF
- Traction motors: 24 × Mitsubishi MB-5153-B 130 kW (174 hp) 3-phase AC induction motor
- Power output: 3.12 MW (4,184 hp)
- Acceleration: 1 m/s^{2} (3.3 ft/s^{2})
- Deceleration: 0.8–1 m/s^{2} (2.6–3.3 ft/s^{2}) (service); 1.4 m/s^{2} (4.6 ft/s^{2}) (emergency)
- Power supply: DC-AC
- HVAC: SIGMA Air Conditioning
- Electric systems: 1,500 V DC (Overhead line)
- Current collection: Single-armed Pantograph (Brecknell Willis)
- UIC classification: 2′2′+Bo′Bo′+Bo′Bo′+Bo′Bo′+Bo′Bo′+Bo′Bo′+Bo′Bo′+2′2′
- Bogies: SDA-140 (C6014-14E) by CRRC Qingdao Sifang
- Braking systems: Knorr-Bremse KBGM-P electropneumatic and regenerative
- Safety systems: Current: SACEM (retrofitted); Future: Alstom - Thales JV Advanced SelTrac CBTC with subsystems of ATC, ATO under GoA3 (DTO), ATP, NetTrac ATS, CBI)
- Coupling system: Faiveley
- Track gauge: 1,432 mm (4 ft 8 3/8 in) (except for West Island line and Kwun Tong line extension); 1,435 mm (4 ft 8 1/2 in) (West Island line and Kwun Tong line extension)

The MTR CRRC Qingdao Sifang EMU (traditional Chinese: 港鐵中國青島四方製列車; simplified Chinese: 港铁中国青岛四方制列车) also named MTR Urban Lines Vision Train and also known as Q-Train, is a new rolling stock ordered by MTR Hong Kong in July 2015. They had been replacing the aging Metro-Cammell EMU (DC) trains since 27 November 2022, with the target to replace all of them by 2027-2028. The order currently consists of 744 cars (93 trainsets).

== Development ==
In conjunction with the upgrade of the existing signalling system from SACEM to Advanced SelTrac CBTC, MTR Corporation originally planned for 78 8-car trains to be ordered. This order was made as a replacement to the existing M-Trains, currently the oldest trains on the MTR network, having been in operation since 1979. 15 M-Trains, excluding those operating on the Disneyland Resort line, were planned to be refurbished. However, this was later dropped as it would be more cost effective to purchase new rolling stock. The rolling stock order was subsequently increased to 93 trainsets at HK$6.05 billion (US$779 million) on grounds that it provided "better value for money". The trains will operate on the Kwun Tong line, Tsuen Wan line, Island line and Tseung Kwan O line. All trainsets were expected to be fully delivered by 2023. By the end of 2022, 19 of the 93 trainsets were delivered to MTR and of which only 3 were in service (all on the Kwun Tong line).

Progress of the trains entering service has been impeded because the aforementioned signalling system replacement program was severely delayed due to a crash on the Tsuen Wan line next to Central station in a test run during midnight on the new signalling system in 2019, which delayed the whole process by 7 years. MTR blamed Thales for the incident by making three errors during the installation, which led to data not being properly established at crossover junction near Central station. These findings were corroborated by the Electrical and Mechanical Services Department.

While a small number of Q-trains have been delivered to Hong Kong since 2018, these trains, except for a few rare test runs, have been parked at the various depots of MTR's Urban Lines and the Siu Ho Wan depot. As the contractor for the SelTrac system, Alstom-Thales, failed to deliver a proper software fix for the system, MTR originally announced that all 93 trainsets would be retrofitted with SACEM (but only 28 trainsets (A731/A732-A785/A786) were retrofitted) so they can begin operations and replace the oldest M-trains servicing the Kwun Tong Line, so that they can be retired on time. The first 65 Q-trains will only be retrofitted with SelTrac, whilst the other 28 will then continue to use SACEM until it is possible to use SelTrac. On 21 August, the train began shadow test runs just after the last train to Whampoa departs. By the end of 2022, eight of the nineteen delivered trainsets had been retrofitted with SACEM.

On 22 November 2022, MTR announced that the first Q trains will commence operation on the Kwun Tong Line on 27 November that year. On 27 November 2022 at 8:52, Q train set A753/A754 opened its doors to the public for the first time on the Kwun Tong Line, with the first train commencing operation at Choi Hung station.

On 19 January 2024, MTR announced that the Q train will commence operation on the Island Line on 28 January that year, with the train set A769/A770 starting passenger operations on the line at 9:48 at Chai Wan Station that day.

On 24 February 2026, MTR announced the new signalling system would start operations on March 15 that year. On 18 March 2026, one trainset with the SelTrac system (A611/A612) began shadow runs just after the last train to Central departs.

On 28 March 2026, MTR announced that the Q train will begin service on the Tsuen Wan Line (A605/A606) starting 29 March 2026 at 10:55, at Tsuen Wan station, with operations commencing on the line at 10:55 that day.

== Design ==
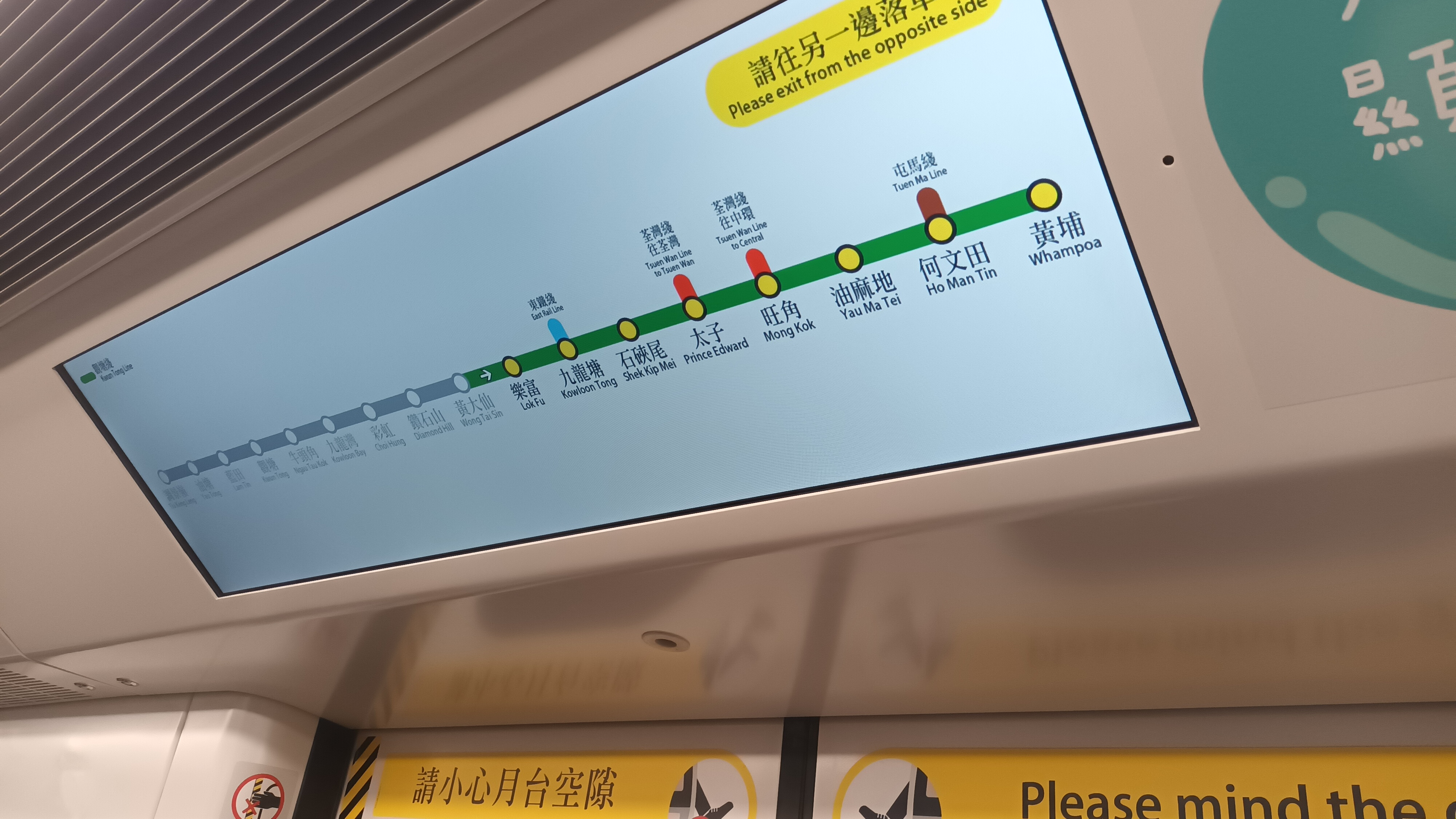
Wayfinding screen for the Kwun Tong line

The new train sets feature an improved lighting system, new dynamic route maps, double-branched handrails, soft materials for hanging straps, colourful flooring and seats (leaning area, not the seats itself), wider doors, and rubber gangways. The trains share a similar livery to the new MTR trains delivered since 2016, namely the S-Train, TML C-Train, and R-Train which run on the South Island line, Tuen Ma line, and East Rail line respectively.

All train doors and coupler systems are made by Faiveley. The coupler systems are automatic and semi-permanent couplers.
