= MTR Hyundai Rotem EMU =

Model of electric multiple unit operated by the MTR

R-Train; MTR Hyundai Rotem EMU; 港鐵東鐵綫現代列車
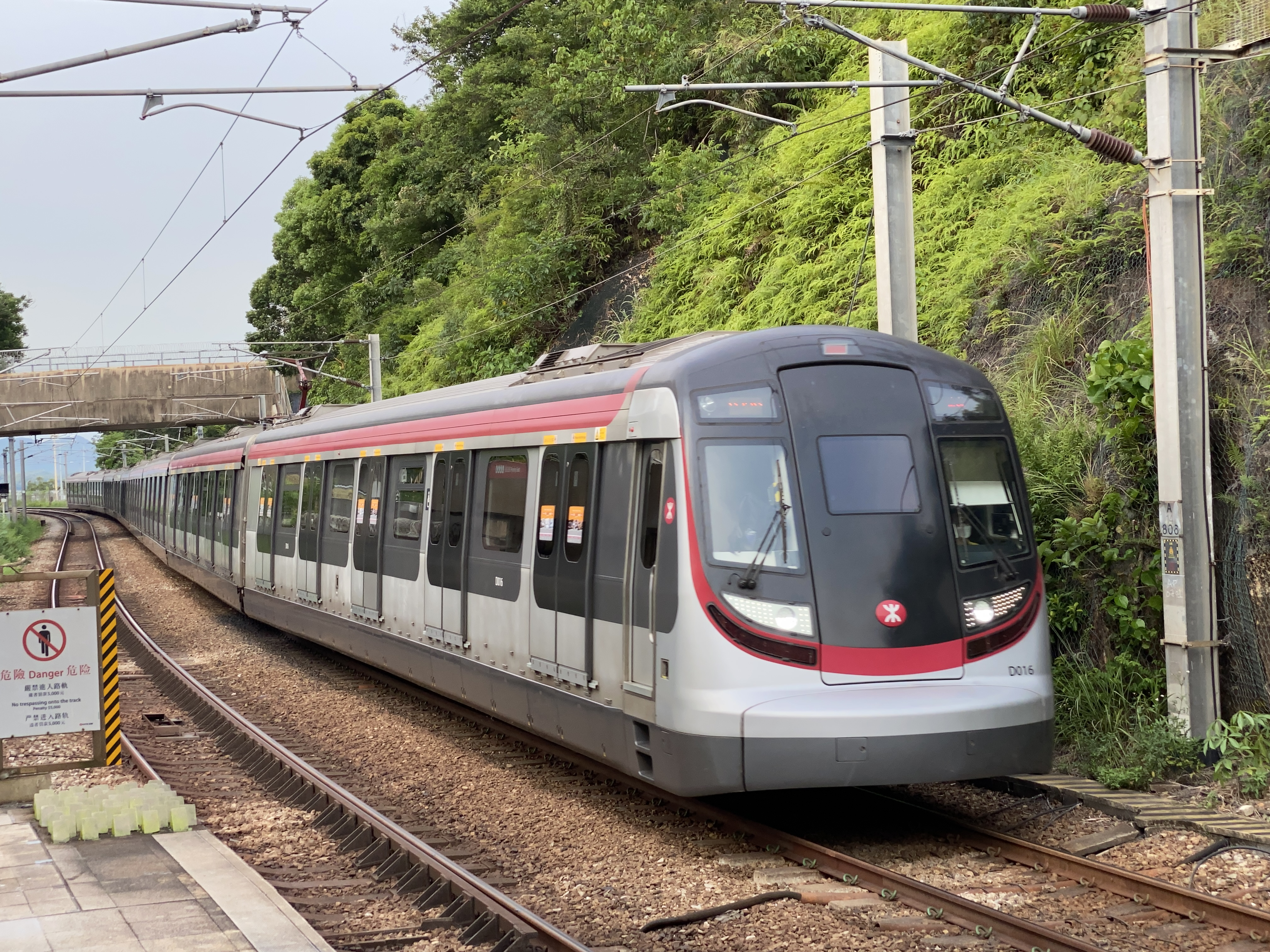
- MTR Hyundai Rotem EMU entering University station

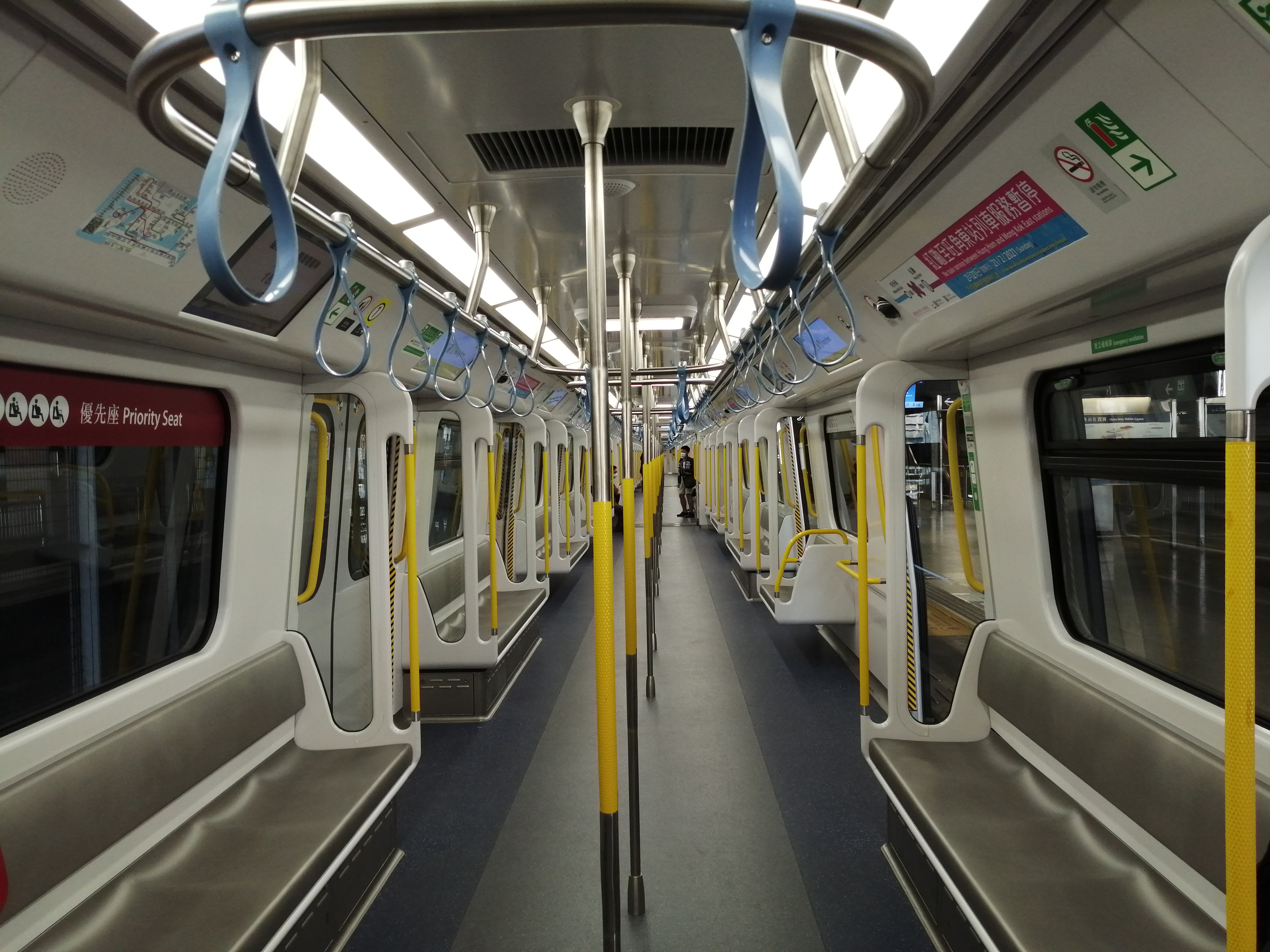
- Interior of the Hyundai Rotem EMU
- In service: 6 February 2021; 5 years ago - present
- Manufacturer: Hyundai Rotem
- Order no.: SCL-1141B
- Built at: Busan, South Korea
- Replaced: MTR Metro Cammell EMU (AC) (MLR)
- Constructed: 2014–2022
- Entered service: 6 February 2021; 5 years ago
- Number built: 333 vehicles (37 sets)
- Number in service: 333 vehicles (37 sets)
- Formation: 9 cars per trainset
- Fleet numbers: D001/D003 – D109/D111
- Capacity: 82,500 pphpd
- Operator: MTR
- Depots: Ho Tung Lau, Fo Tan
- Line served: East Rail line

Specifications
- Car body construction: Stainless steel + fibreglass (header)
- Train length: 218,952 mm (718 ft 4.2 in)
- Car length: 25 m (82 ft 0.3 in) (end cars); 24,136 mm (79 ft 2.2 in)(intermediate cars)
- Width: 3.22 m (10 ft 6.8 in)
- Height: 4.18 m (13 ft 8.6 in) (excluding roof equipment)
- Platform height: 1,066.8 mm (3 ft 6.00 in)
- Doors: 5 per side; 2 per side (first class)
- Maximum speed: 140 km/h (87 mph) (design); 120 km/h (75 mph) (service)
- Weight: D car: 46 t (101,000 lb); P car: 47 t (104,000 lb); M car: 45–46 t (99,000–101,000 lb); F car: 46 t (101,000 lb)
- Traction system: Mitsubishi Electric MAP-194-A25V268 IGBT–VVVF
- Traction motors: 24 × Mitsubishi Electric MB-5153-A 190 kW (255 hp) 3-phase AC induction motor
- Power output: 4.56 MW (6,115 hp)
- Acceleration: 1 m/s^{2} (3.3 ft/s^{2})
- Deceleration: 1 m/s^{2} (3.3 ft/s^{2}) (service); 1.35 m/s^{2} (4.4 ft/s^{2}) (emergency)
- Power supply: AC-DC-AC
- Electric system: 25 kV 50 Hz AC overhead catenary
- Current collection: Single-arm pantograph
- UIC classification: Bo′Bo′+2′2′+Bo′Bo′+Bo′Bo′+2′2′+Bo′Bo′+Bo′Bo′+2′2′+Bo′Bo′
- Braking systems: Knorr-Bremse EP2002 electropneumatic and regenerative
- Safety systems: Siemens Trainguard MT CBTC, ATO and ATP
- Coupling system: Tightlock
- Track gauge: 1,435 mm (4 ft 8 1/2 in) standard gauge

The Hyundai Rotem EMU (also known as R-Train or 1141B) (Chinese: 港鐵東鐵綫現代列車) is a current model of heavy rail electric multiple units used on the Mass Transit Railway in Hong Kong. The 9-car sets are manufactured by Hyundai Rotem for the North South Corridor, an extension of the East Rail line, at a cost of HK$4 billion. and the first delivery took place in 2015, while a further 6 trains were ordered in May 2020, although the 6 trains were never manufactured. Originally scheduled to enter service in late-2017 to early-2018, the trains gradually entered service from 6 February 2021. All train sets were put into service in 2022, replacing the Metro Cammell EMUs and displacing the SP1900 EMUs to the Tuen Ma Line.

== Formation ==
The formation ranges from D001/D003 (Trainset 1) to D109/D111 (Trainset 37). Like the previous SP1900s and Metro Cammell EMUs, one car is still reserved for the first class in each train set. However, the R-train's first class is not that comfortable compared to previous models. The 9-car formation is shorter than the previous 12-car East Rail Line trains, due to space constraints imposed by new underground platforms on the Sha Tin to Central Link. There are concerns that the new formation may worsen the existing overcrowding problem. However, the Transport and Housing Bureau and MTRC suggest that the new signaling system and higher train speeds will increase the train frequency from three minutes down to two minutes. It was also estimated that with the completion of the Sha Tin to Central Link (Tai Wai – Hung Hom section), 20% of the current East Rail line passengers will take the new East West Corridor.

== Design and features ==
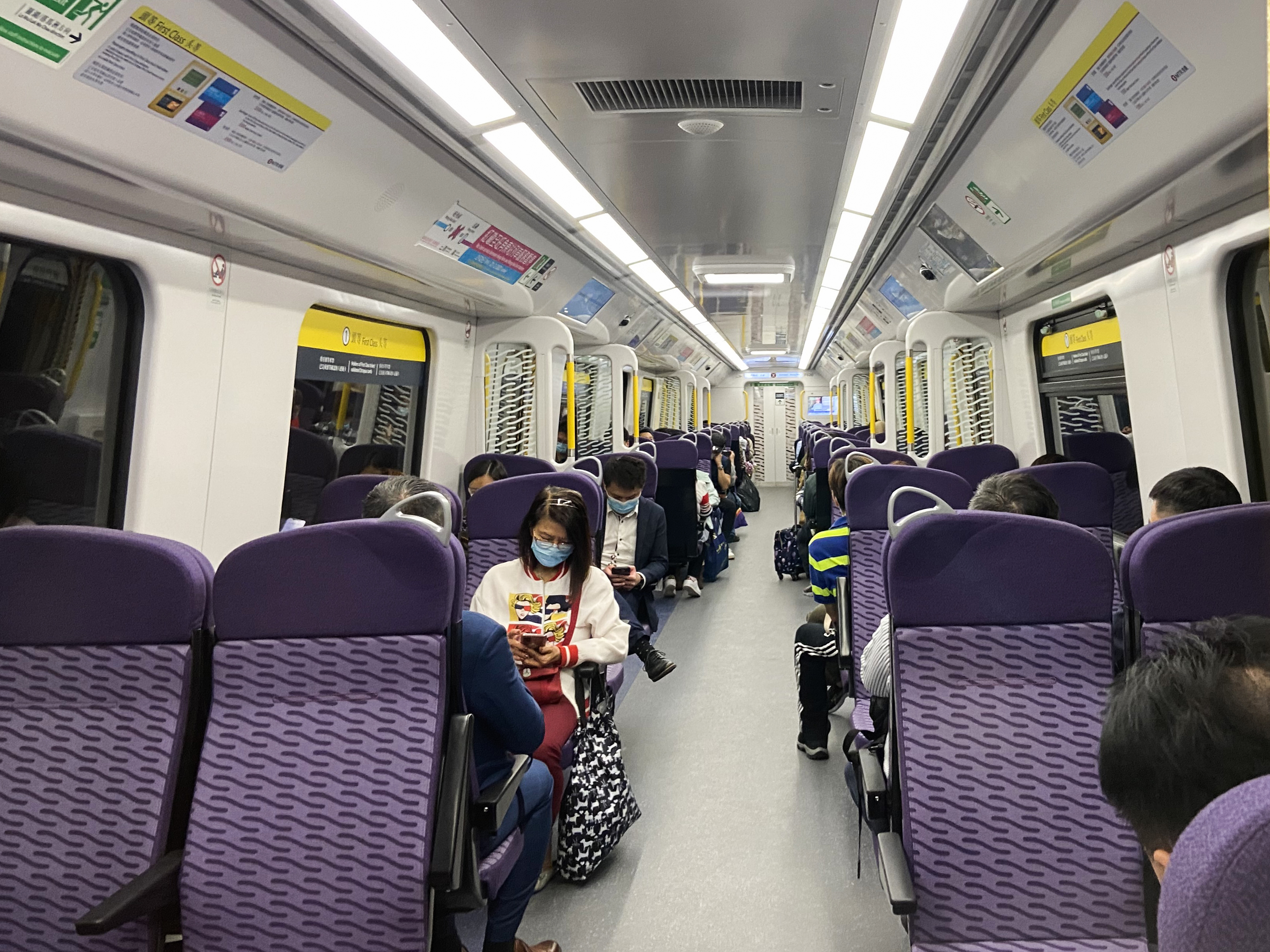
First class compartment of the Hyundai Rotem EMU

The Hyundai Rotem EMU train is more advanced than the existing trains, which aligns with MTR's other newest trains, such as the S-trains. These trains including the presence of emergency exits, the first new trains on the ex-KCR network to be so equipped (though such doorways existed on the pre-refurbished Metro Cammell trains). They are painted in the same livery as the trains delivered to MTR since 2016, namely the S-trains, TML C-trains and Q-Trains. The cab ends, though, show some small differences, including a slightly angled front end and modified headlight cluster.

Other differences between the R-trains and ex-KCR rolling stock include the following:

- Train doors on this stock are more evenly distributed, similar to pre-merger MTR trains. This is especially noticeable in the first class compartment, where the doors are painted yellow to distinguish from standard class. The location of the doors in the first class compartment allow both to be used for normal boarding, which is not possible using the offset arrangement of previous sets.
- Seats near gangway connections are placed horizontally, making room for standing space.
- The train compartment is wider than existing trains, increasing capacity. This will also allows safer boarding and alighting at stations with curved platforms due to a wide gaps between the train and the platform, such as at University Station and Mong Kok East Station.
- All lighting uses eco-friendly LEDs instead of fluorescent or incandescent lighting.
- 27-inch (686 mm) LCD is installed for MTR In-Train TV.
- Dynamic route maps and improved grab poles that branch out into two in the centre.

Cars of Hyundai Rotem EMU
car type	description	driver cab	motor	pantograph	driving panel	emergency door at heads	emergency stairs at sides	cross train line	class
D car	the motor car with driver cab	O	O	X	X	O	X	X	standard class
F car	the first class compartment motor car	X	O	X	O	X	X	X	first class
M car	the motor car	X	O	X	O	X	X	O (at M car in the middle group)	standard class
P car	the trailer car with pantograph	X	X	O	X	X	O	X	standard class
