= Railway electric traction =

Use of currents for propulsion of trains

Railway electric traction describes the various types of locomotive and multiple units that are used on electrification systems around the world.

== History ==
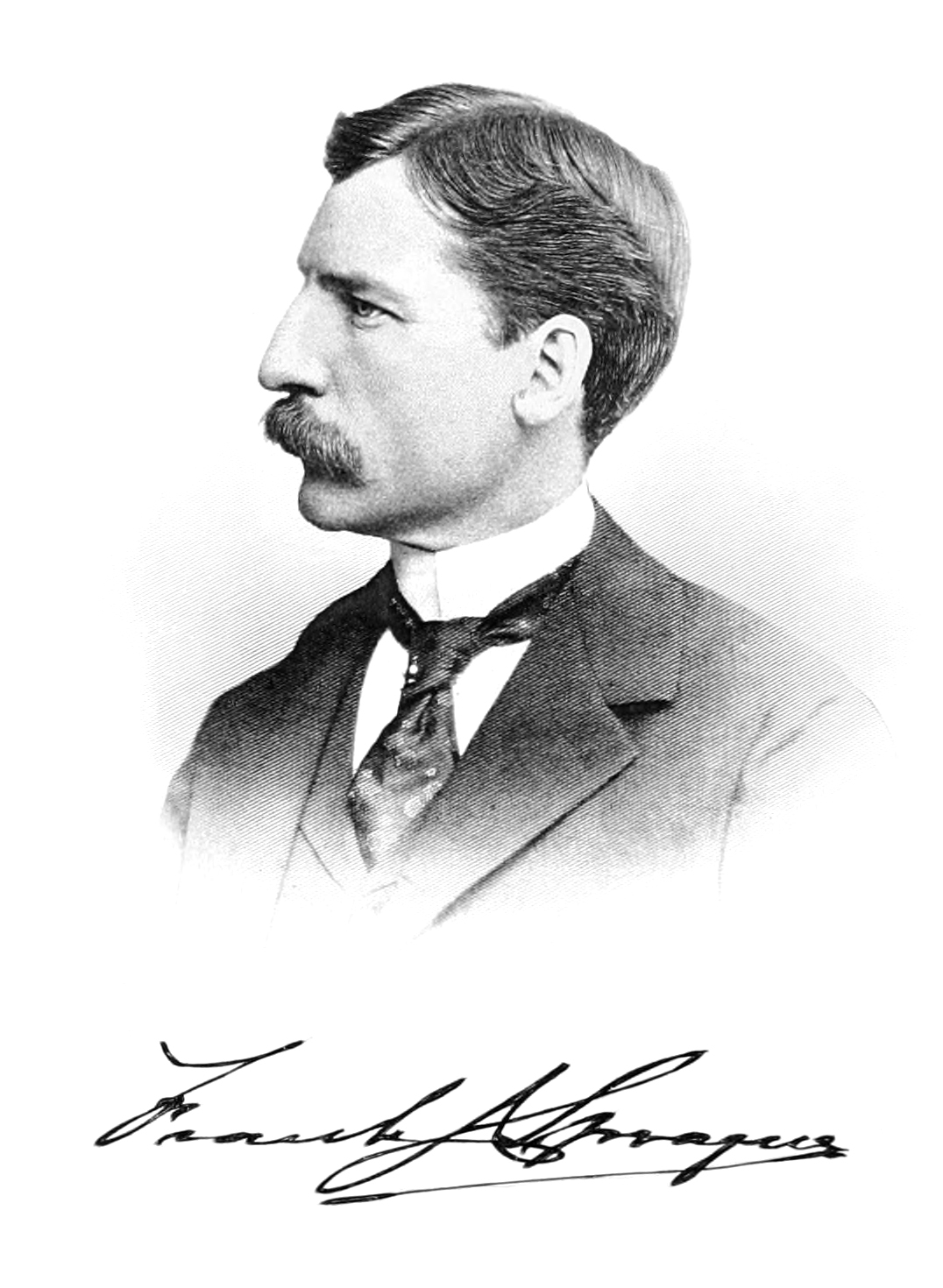
Frank J. Sprague, a pioneer of electric traction in 1887

Railway electrification as a means of traction emerged at the end of the nineteenth century, although experiments in electric rail have been traced back to the mid-nineteenth century. Thomas Davenport, in Brandon, Vermont, erected a circular model railroad on which ran battery-powered locomotives (or locomotives running on battery-powered rails) in 1834. Robert Davidson, of Aberdeen, Scotland, created an electric locomotive in 1839 and ran it on the Edinburgh-Glasgow railway at 4 miles per hour. The earliest electric locomotives tended to be battery-powered. In 1880, Thomas Edison built a small electrical railway, using a dynamo as the motor and the rails as the current-carrying medium. The electric current flowed through the metal rim of otherwise wooden wheels, being picked up via contact brushes.

Electrical traction offered several benefits over the then predominant steam traction, particularly in respect of its quick acceleration (ideal for urban (metro) and suburban (commuter) services) and power (ideal for heavy freight trains through mountainous/hilly sections). A plethora of systems emerged in the first twenty years of the twentieth century.

== Unit types ==
=== DC traction units ===
Direct current (DC) traction units use current drawn from a third rail, fourth rail, ground-level power supply or an overhead line. AC voltage is converted into DC voltage by using a rectifier.

=== AC traction units ===
Alternating current (AC) traction units involve an inverter and produce variable traction output based on the frequency of the AC current. They are equipped in most modern rolling stock for lower maintenance cost and easier scalability relative to DC units.

=== Multi-system units ===
Because of the variety of railway electrification systems, which can vary even within a country, trains often have to pass from one system to another. One way to accomplish this is by changing locomotives at the switching stations. These stations have overhead wires that can be switched from one voltage to another and so the train arrives with one locomotive and then departs with another. The switching stations have very sophisticated components and they are very expensive.

A less expensive switching station may have different electrification systems at both exits with no switchable wires. Instead the voltage on the wires changes across a small gap in them near the middle of the station. Electric locomotives coast into the station with their pantographs down and halt under a wire of the wrong voltage. A diesel shunter can then return the locomotive to the right side of the station. Both approaches are inconvenient and time-consuming, taking about ten minutes.

Another way is to use multi-system motive power that can operate under several different voltages and current types. In Europe, two-, three- and four-system locomotives for cross-frontier freight traffic are becoming a common sight (1.5 kV DC, 3 kV DC, 15 kV 16.7 Hz AC, 25 kV 50 Hz AC). Locomotives and multiple units so equipped can, depending on line configuration and operation rules, pass from one electrification system to another without a stop, coasting for a short distance for the changeover, past the dead section between the different voltages.

Eurostar trains through the Channel Tunnel are multisystem; a significant part of the route near London was on southern England's 750 V DC third rail system, the route into Brussels is 3 kV DC overhead, while the rest of the route is 25 kV 50 Hz overhead. The need for these trains to use third rail into London Waterloo station ended upon completion of High Speed 1 line in 2007. Southern England uses some overhead/third rail dual-system locomotives, such as the class 92 for Channel Tunnel, and multiple units, e.g. the Class 319 on Thameslink services, to allow through running between 750 V DC third rail south of London and 25 kV AC overhead north and east of London.

Electro-diesel locomotives, which can operate as an electric locomotive on electrified lines but have an on-board diesel engine for non-electrified sections or sidings, have been used in several countries; examples are the British Class 73 from the 1960s and the last mile concept from around 2011, where an electric freight locomotive can work sidings under Diesel power (TRAX dual mode).

== Battery electric rail vehicles ==
A few battery electric railcars and locomotives were used in the twentieth century, but generally the use of battery power was not practical except in underground mining systems. See Accumulator car and Battery locomotive.

== High-speed rail ==
Many high-speed rail systems use electric trains, such as the Shinkansen and the TGV.

== See also ==
- High-speed rail
- Maglev train
- Tram
