= MTR CRRC Changchun EMU =

Model of electric multiple unit operated by the MTR

TML C-train; CRRC Changchun EMU; 港鐵屯馬綫中國製列車
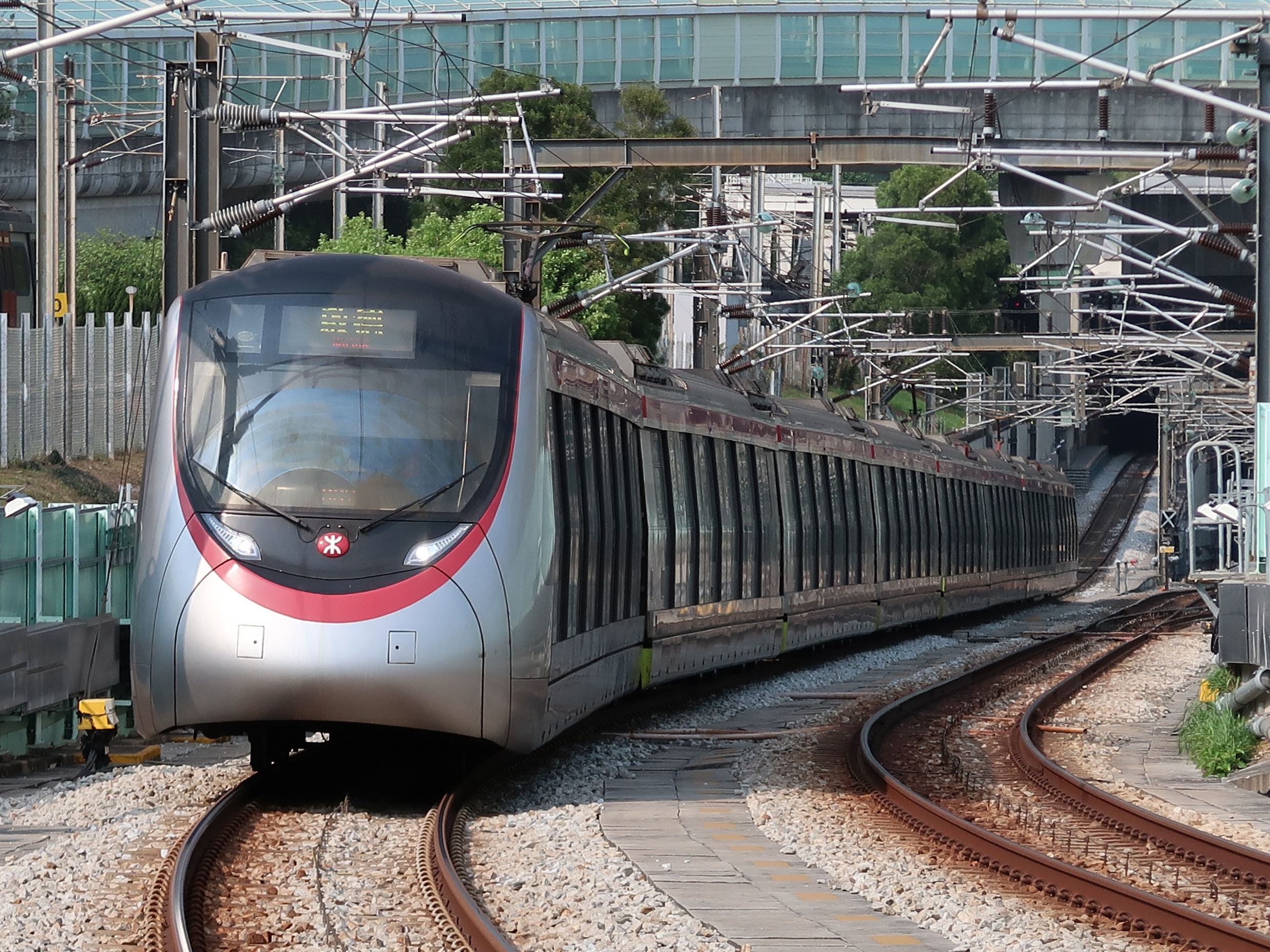
- A MTR Tuen Ma line C-Train train approaching Hin Keng station

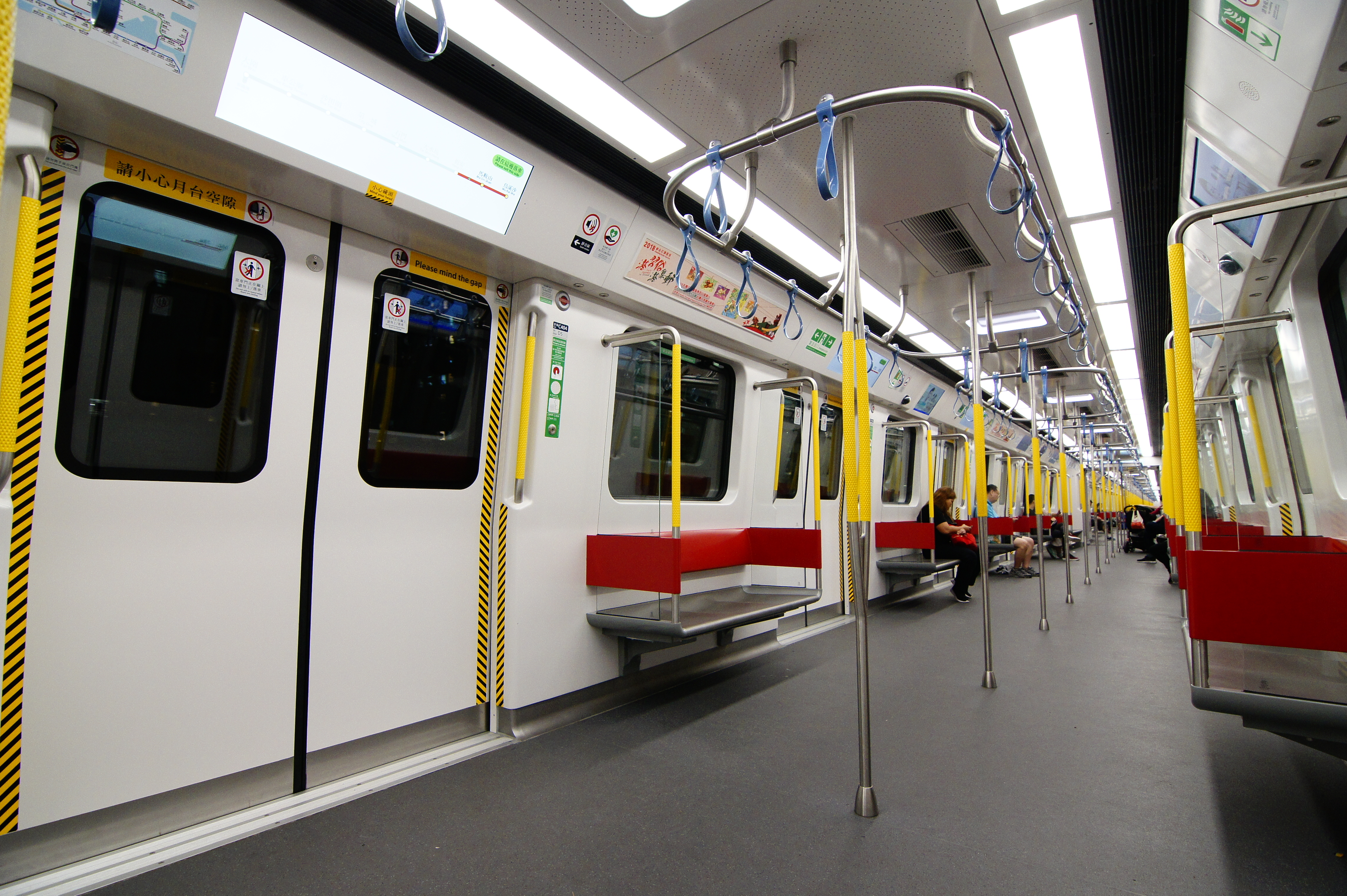
- Interior of the TML C-train
- In service: 12 March 2017; 9 years ago – present
- Manufacturer: CRRC Changchun Railway Vehicles
- Order no.: SCL-1141A
- Built at: Changchun, Jilin, China
- Constructed: 2015–2018
- Entered service: 12 March 2017; 9 years ago
- Number built: 17 sets (136 cars)
- Formation: 8 cars per trainset
- Fleet numbers: D397/D398, D401/D402 to D431/D432
- Capacity: C, K, M, P cars: 452; D cars: 430
- Operator: MTR
- Depots: Pat Heung; Tai Wai
- Line served: Tuen Ma line

Specifications
- Car body construction: Stainless steel
- Train length: 195,376 mm (641 ft 0 in)
- Car length: 25,280 mm (82 ft 11.3 in) (end cars); 24,136 mm (79 ft 2 in) (intermediate cars)
- Width: 3.1 m (10 ft 2.05 in)
- Height: 3.99 m (13 ft 1.09 in) (without roof equipment)
- Platform height: 1,066.8 mm (3 ft 6.0 in)
- Entry: Level boarding
- Doors: 5 sets of 58 inch wide doors per side
- Maximum speed: 160 km/h (99 mph) (design); 130 km/h (81 mph) (service)
- Traction system: Mitsubishi Electric MAP-194-A25V275 IGBT–VVVF
- Traction motors: 20 × Mitsubishi MB-5153-A2 190 kW (254.8 hp) 3-phase AC induction motor
- Power output: 3.8 MW (5,095.9 hp)
- Acceleration: 1 m/s^{2} (3.3 ft/s^{2})
- Deceleration: 1 m/s^{2} (3.3 ft/s^{2}) (service); 1.35 m/s^{2} (4.4 ft/s^{2}) (emergency)
- Power supply: AC-DC-AC
- Electric system: 25 kV 50 Hz AC overhead catenary
- Current collection: Single-armed Pantograph
- UIC classification: 2′2′+Bo′Bo′+Bo′Bo′+Bo′Bo′+2′2′+Bo′Bo′+Bo′Bo′+2′2′
- Bogies: CW6020D (powered), CW6020 (trailer)
- Braking systems: Knorr-Bremse EP Compact electropneumatic and regenerative
- Safety system: SelTrac CBTC
- Coupling system: Tightlock
- Track gauge: 1,435 mm (4 ft 8 1/2 in) standard gauge

The MTR CRRC Changchun EMU (also known as the TML C-train (Note: Short for Tuen Ma line Changchun-made train) or 1141A) is a model of heavy rail electric multiple units of the Mass Transit Railway in Hong Kong. The 8-car sets are manufactured by Changchun Railway Vehicles for the East West Corridor (Tuen Ma Line), to operate alongside extended SP1900 sets (1151) from the West Rail line. They are currently in service on the Tuen Ma line. Before the opening of the Tuen Ma Line in 2021, their name was EWL C train, which stands for East West Link Changchun train.

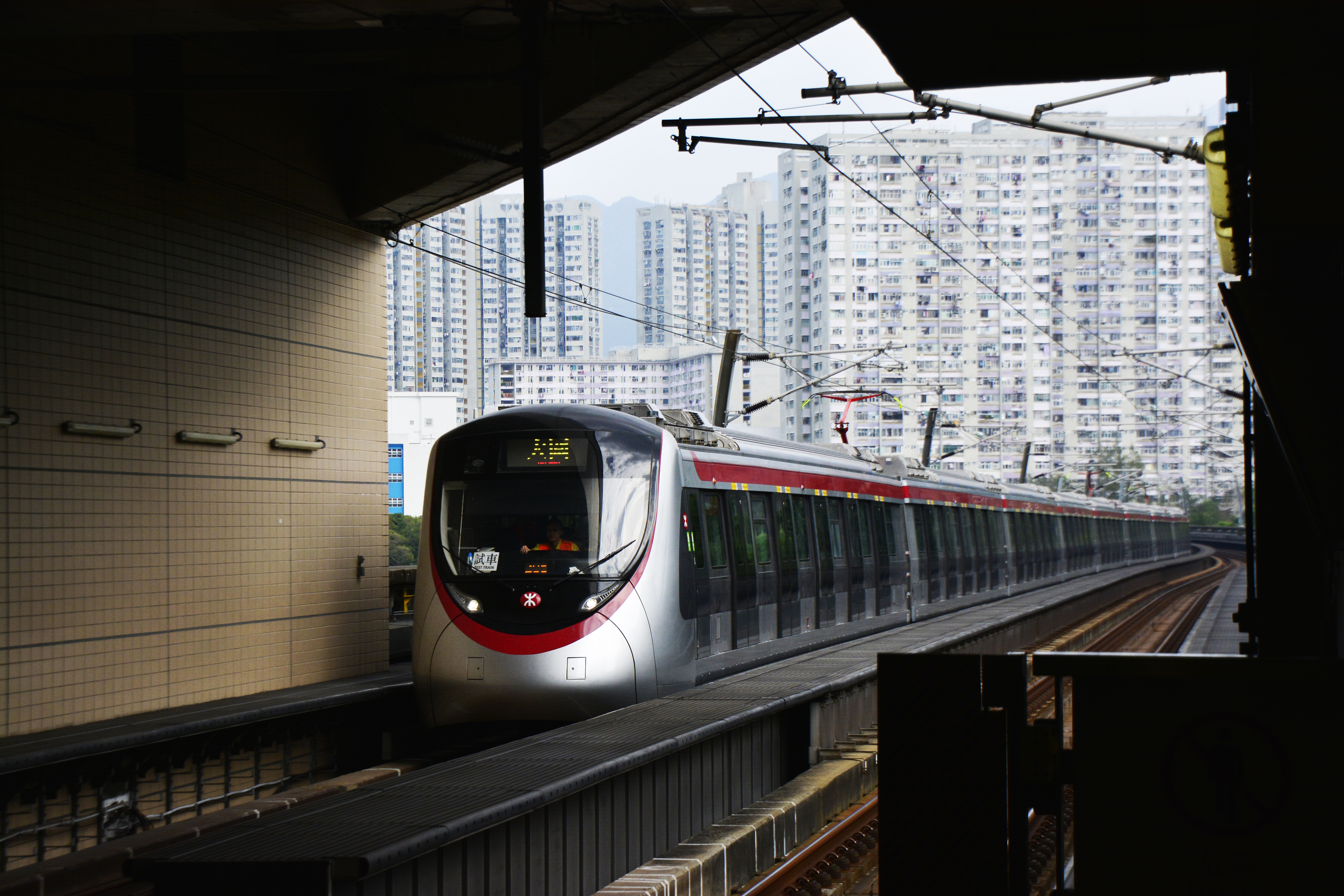
TML C-train on test entering Che Kung Temple Station

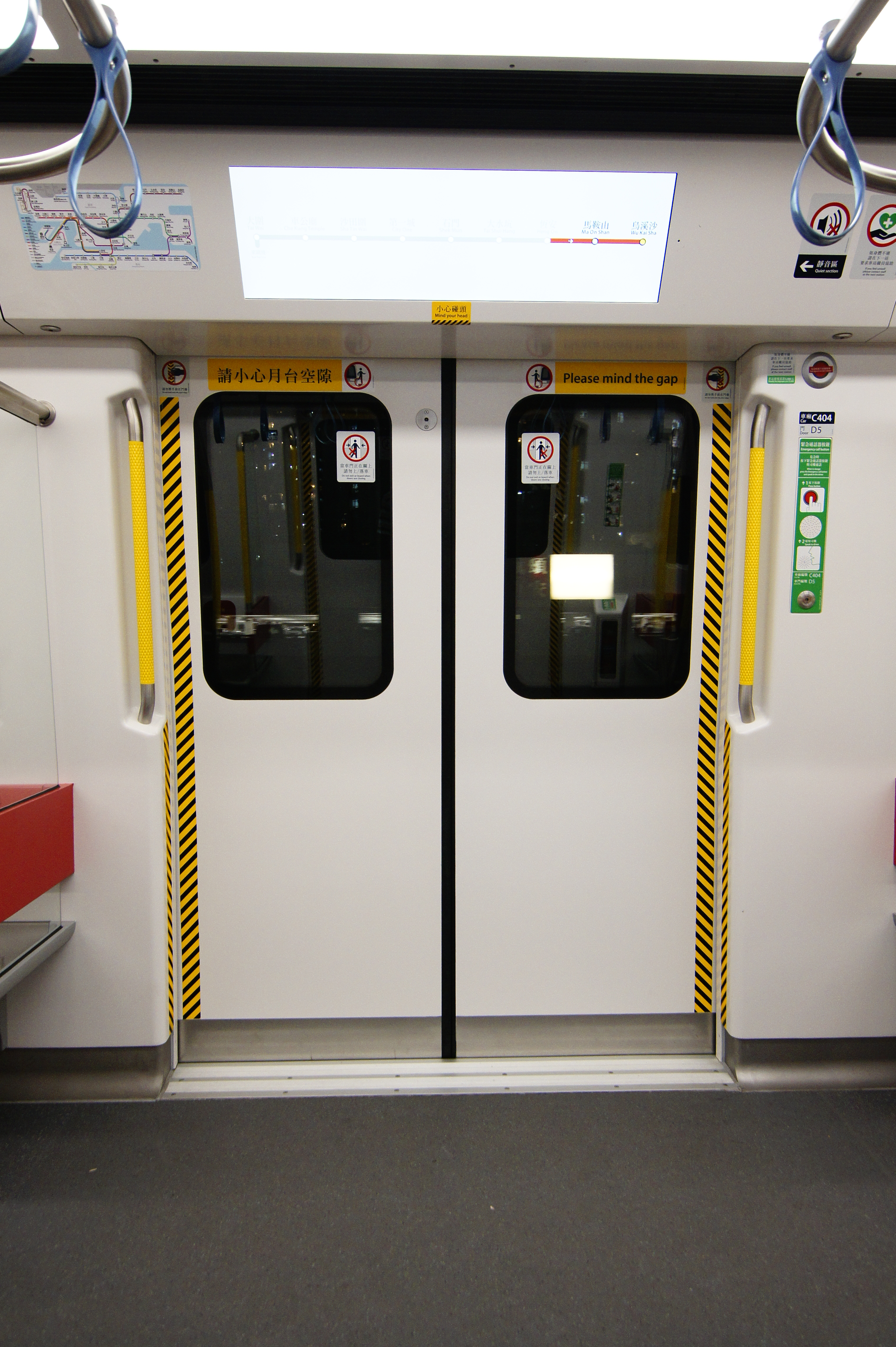
Train doors

== Description ==
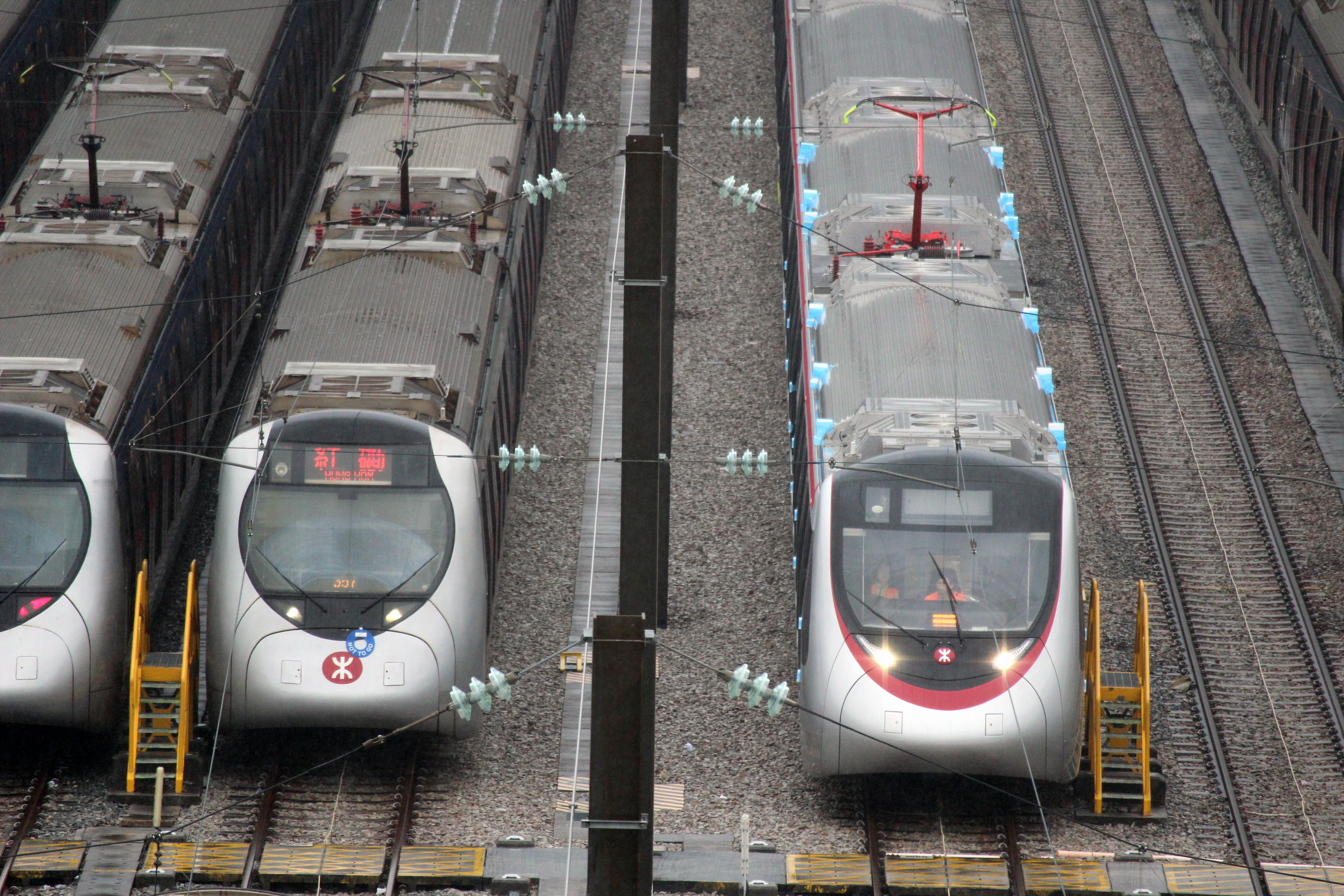
The front end of the train, alongside the older SP1900

Nicknamed the "pseudo-SP1900", the exterior appearance of the TML C-train is similar to that of the SP1900, with the most notable differences being located at the cab ends. It is painted in the same livery as the R-trains on the East Rail line, the S-trains on the South Island line, and the Q-trains on the urban lines. The latter two were manufactured by the same company.

The interior layout of the trains has been updated, presenting a refreshed version of the SP1900 design. Notable enhancements include the addition of a new dynamic route map display positioned above the doorways. In terms of seating arrangement, the trains now feature rows of three seats between each doorway, contrasting the four-seat configuration found in the SP1900. At the ends of the carriage, two rows of five seats are still present. Another change is the installation of 22-inch (559 mm) LCD TVs, replacing the 15-inch (381 mm) TVs found in the SP1900. While the electrical equipment and propulsion systems resemble those found in the R-Trains for the East Rail line, there are differences between the two.

The stock bid (number 1141A) was won by China CRRC Changchun Railway Vehicles Corporation Limited in December 2013, at a cost of $1.38 billion Hong Kong Dollars. The order was initially for 14 8-car trains, however this was bumped up to 17 8-car trains. This is likely due to the Tuen Mun South extension (still under planning at the time). The first of this train set joined service on the Ma On Shan line in March 2017 and joined service on the West Rail line in March 2020. All 17 trains are running on the whole Tuen Ma line, which fully opened on 27 June 2021. In 2024, the MTR issued a contract for modification works for the TML C train's auxiliary Power Supply System. The bid was awarded to Bright Sunshine limited and it is likely not been finished.
