= MTR CNR Changchun EMU =

Model of electric multiple unit operated by the MTR

CNR Changchun EMU (C/S-Train) C6554-07E / C6554-12E 港鐵市區綫中國長春製列車 港鐵南港島綫中國製列車
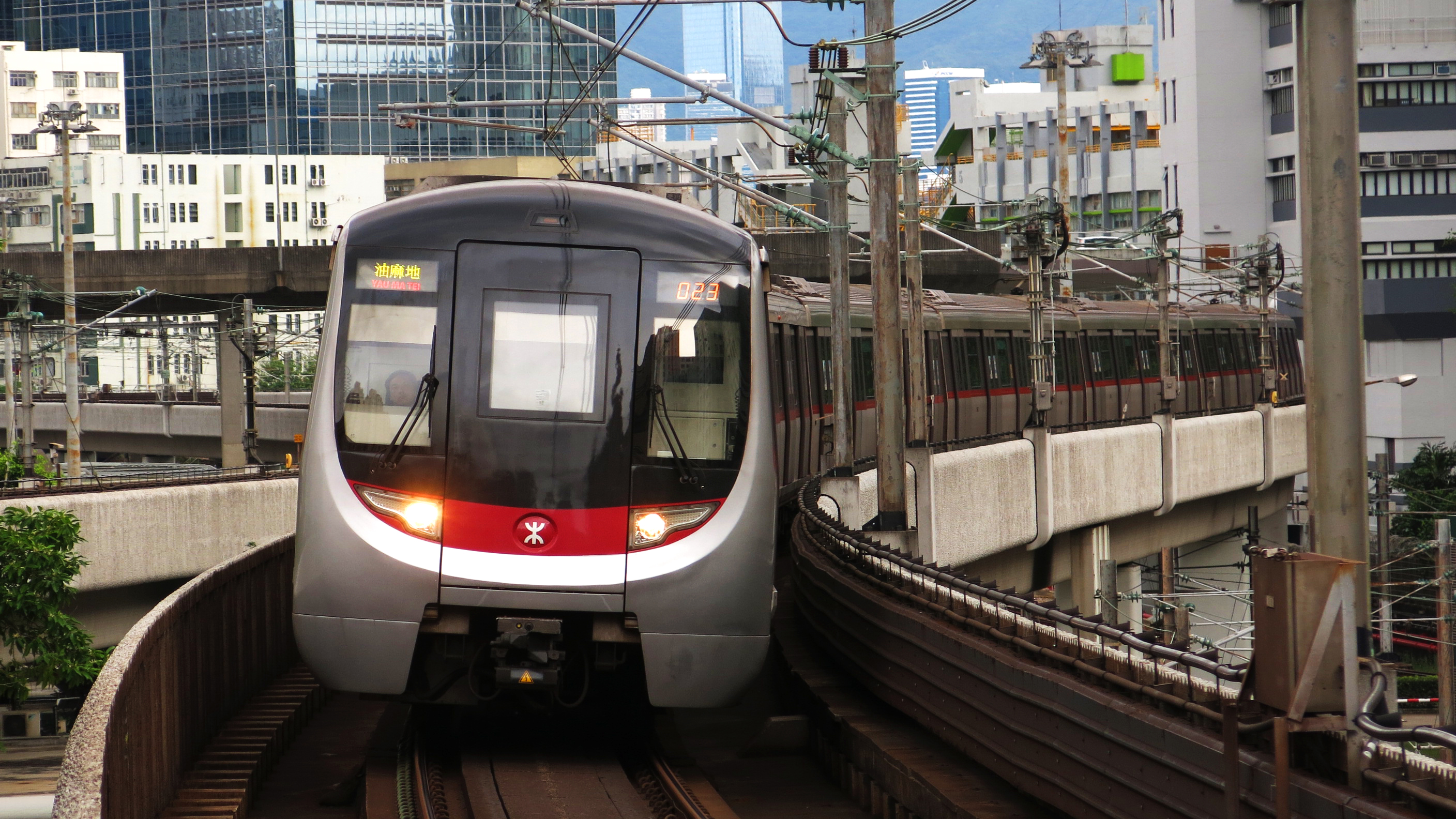
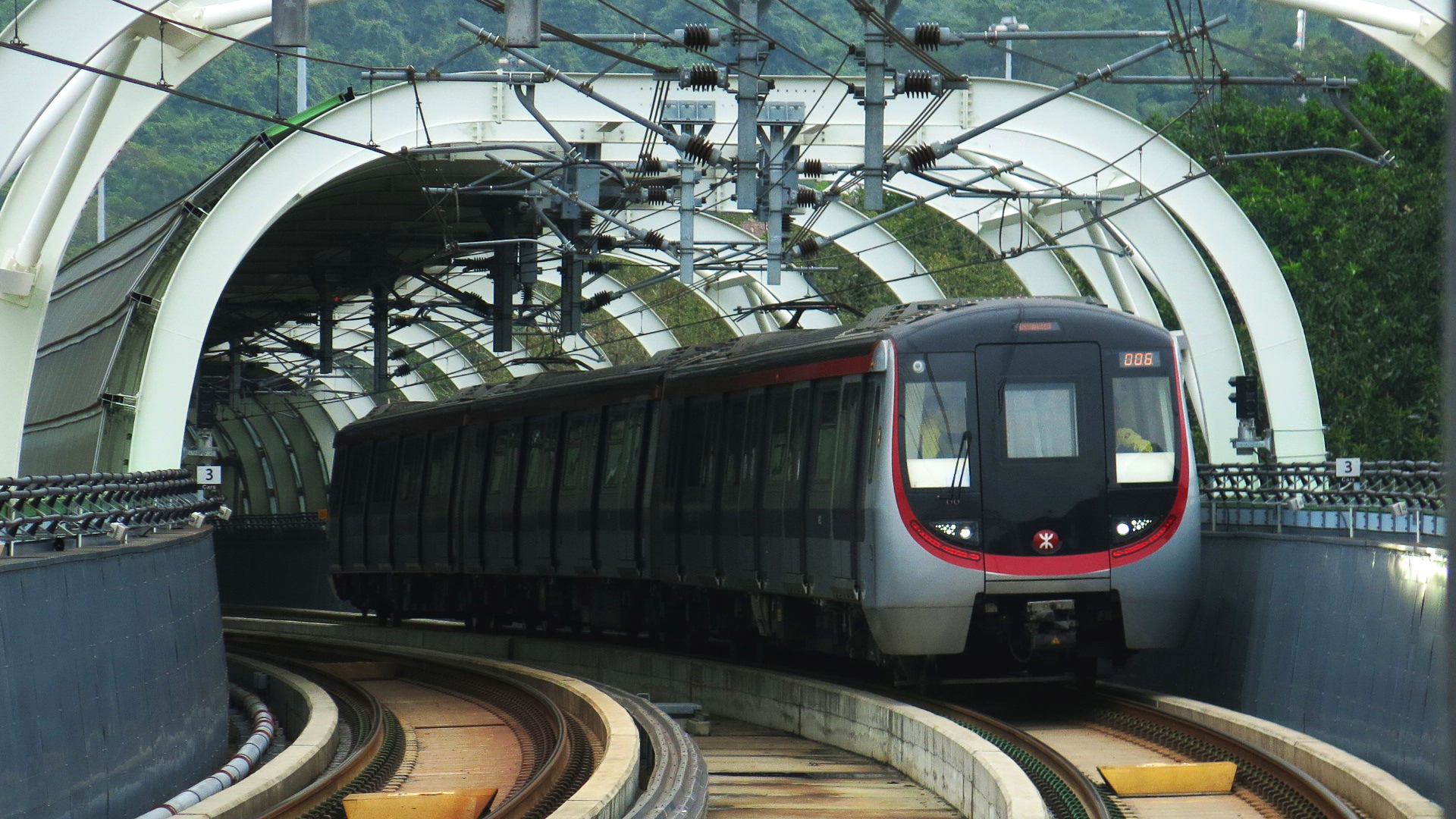
- MTR C-train on the Kwun Tong line MTR S-train on the South Island line

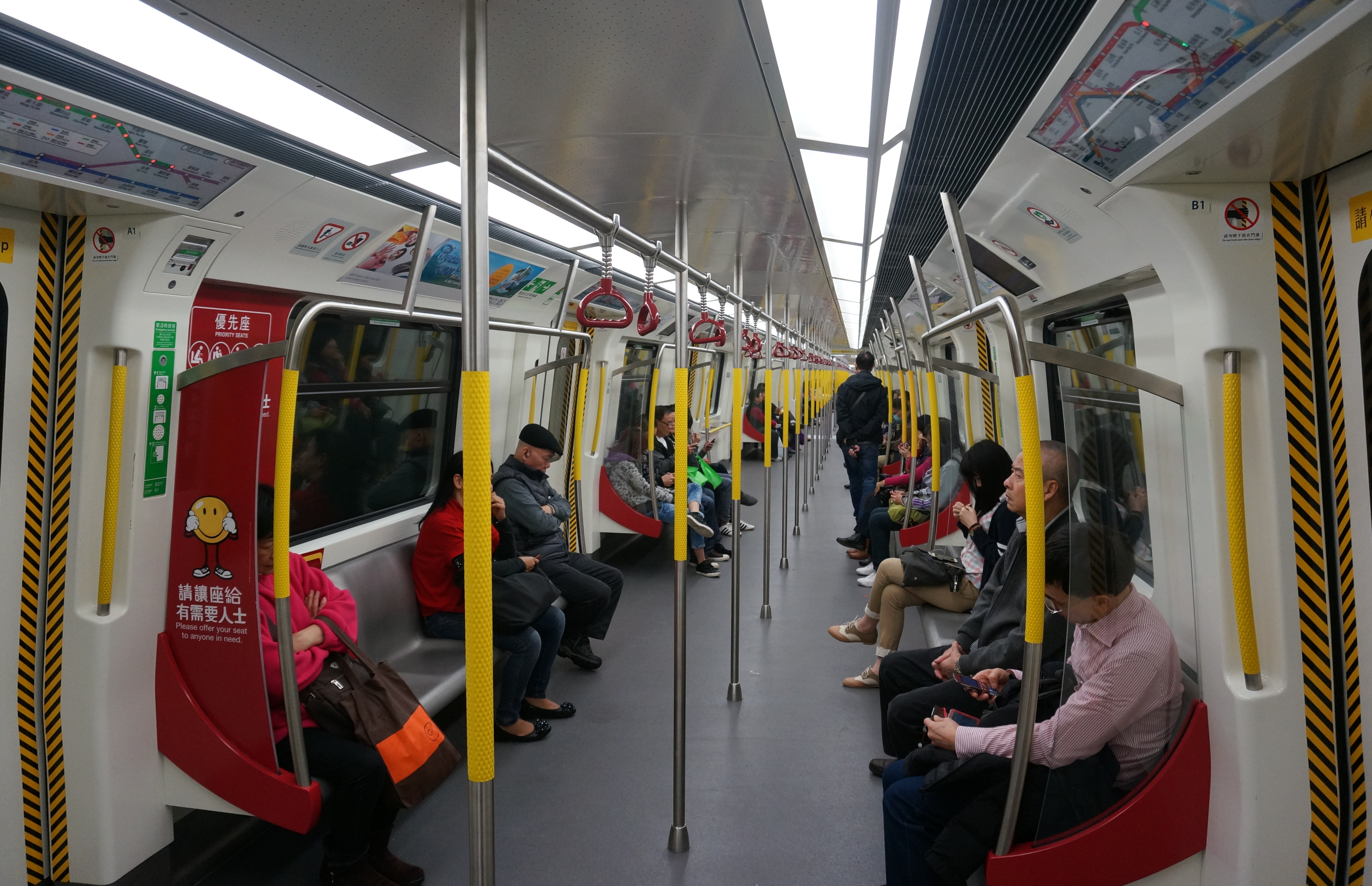
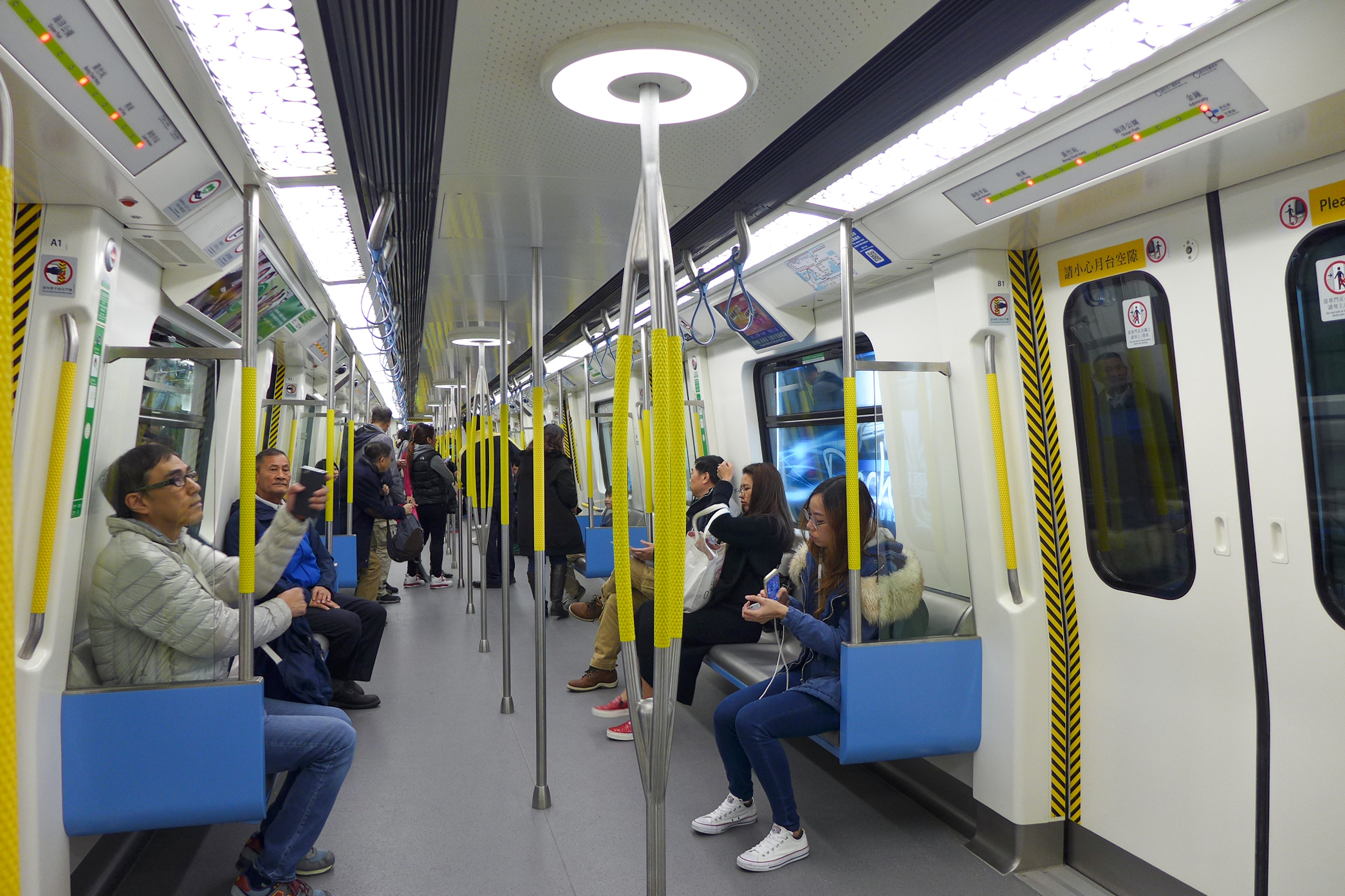
- C-Train interior S-Train interior
- In service: 7 December 2011; 14 years ago – present (Kwun Tong line); 28 December 2016; 9 years ago – present (South Island line)
- Manufacturer: CNR Changchun Railway Vehicles (now CRRC Changchun Railway Vehicles)
- Order no.: Urban Lines: C6554-07E South Island Line: C6554-12E
- Built at: Changchun, Jilin, China
- Family name: Urban lines: DKZ28; South Island line: DKZ50
- Constructed: 2010–2014
- Entered service: 7 December 2011; 14 years ago (Kwun Tong line); 28 December 2016; 9 years ago (South Island line)
- Number built: 22 trains with 8 carriages; 10 trains with 3 carriages; Total: 206 carriages
- Formation: South Island line: 3 cars per trainset; Kwun Tong line: 8 cars per trainset
- Capacity: 2496 (8-car train); 938 (3-car train)
- Operator: MTR
- Depots: Kowloon Bay (Kwun Tong line); Wong Chuk Hang (South Island line)
- Lines served: Kwun Tong line; (C-Train): South Island line; (S-Train)

Specifications
- Car body construction: Stainless steel
- Car length: see the corresponding table
- Width: Kwun Tong line: 3,120 mm (10 ft 2.83 in); South Island line: 3,120 mm (10 ft 2.83 in)
- Height: 3,698 mm (12 ft 1.591 in) (without pantograph or air conditioner); 3,727.5 mm (12 ft 2.752 in) (with pantograph and air conditioner)
- Floor height: 1,100 mm (3 ft 7.307 in)
- Doors: 10 per carriage (5 doors per side)
- Maximum speed: 90 km/h (56 mph) (design); 80 km/h (50 mph) (service)
- Axle load: 17.5 t (17.2 long tons; 19.3 short tons)
- Traction system: Mitsubishi Electric/Alstom 2-level IGBT–VVVF: Kwun Tong line: Mitsubishi Electric MAP-174-15VD205; South Island line: Alstom OPTONIX MG 1500
- Traction motors: 3-phase AC induction motors: Kwun Tong line: 24 × Mitsubishi Electric MB-5086-A2 155 kW (208 hp); South Island line: 12 × Alstom 4-ECA-2120 200 kW (270 hp)
- Power output: Kwun Tong line: 3.72 MW (4,990 hp); South Island line: 2.4 MW (3,200 hp)
- Acceleration: Kwun Tong line: 1–1.3 m/s^{2} (3.3–4.3 ft/s^{2}); South Island line: 1.35 m/s^{2} (4.4 ft/s^{2})
- Deceleration: Service: 0.8–1.35 m/s^{2} (2.6–4.4 ft/s^{2}); Emergency: 1.4 m/s^{2} (4.6 ft/s^{2})
- Electric systems: 1,500 V DC overhead line
- Current collection: Pantograph
- UIC classification: Kwun Tong line: 2′2′+Bo′Bo′+Bo′Bo′+Bo′Bo′+Bo′Bo′+Bo′Bo′+Bo′Bo′+2′2′; South Island line: Bo′Bo′+Bo′Bo′+Bo′Bo′
- Bogies: CW6000D (powered), CW6000 (trailer)
- Braking systems: Knorr-Bremse electropneumatic and regenerative: Kwun Tong line: KBGM-P; South Island line: EP2002
- Safety systems: Kwun Tong line: Alstom SACEM fixed-block ATP and ATS, with ATO Future: Thales SelTrac moving-block CBTC with subsystems of ATC, ATO under GoA 3 (DTO), ATP, NetTrac ATS, CBI; South Island line: Alstom Urbalis 400 moving-block CBTC with subsystems of ATC, ATO under GoA 4 (UTO), ATP, Iconis ATS, Smartlock CBI
- Coupling system: Faiveley
- Seating: Longitudinal
- Track gauge: 1,432 mm (4 ft 8 3/8 in) (Kwun Tong line to Yau Ma Tei); 1,435 mm (4 ft 8 1/2 in) (South Island line and Kwun Tong line extension)

The Changchun EMU or CNR Changchun EMU is an electric multiple unit train type of the Mass Transit Railway (MTR) system in Hong Kong. Designed and manufactured by Changchun Railway Vehicles, a member of CNR group (now merged with CSR to form CRRC Corporation), they were the first MTR heavy-rail stock to be manufactured in Mainland China, while past orders came from England, Japan, Europe or South Korea.

The trains come in two versions: the C-Train, a manned eight-car train which is used mainly on the Kwun Tong line; and the S-Train, a driverless three-car variant which operates on the South Island line since its opening in December 2016. Similar trains had been ordered for the Tuen Ma line, also known as TML C-Train, which entered service on the Ma On Shan line on 12 March 2017; however, these trains bear a resemblance to the older SP1900 EMUs.

== History ==
Designed in 18 months, the first C-Train rolled off the production lines at CNR's plant on 6 December 2010. It was transported to Hong Kong on 28 April 2011. By 16 October, four sets had arrived and were undergoing testing on the Kwun Tong line. They were expected to enter service sometime that November.

On 22 July 2011, MTR ordered 12 eight-car C-trains to increase the urban line fleet for the West Island line extension and 10 three-car S-Trains for the first phase of the South Island line.

The first C-Train entered service on the Kwun Tong line on 7 December 2011. The last of the eight-car trains was handed over on 5 September 2013, and entered service on the Kwun Tong line shortly after.

The S-Trains began operating on 28 December 2016, the day the South Island line commenced service.

== Train configurations ==
=== Kwun Tong line (contract number C6554-07E - 22 sets) ===
The trains used on the Kwun Tong line are configured as eight-car sets. All intermediate cars (B cars and C cars) have motors, while the control cars (A cars) have no motors. The C cars also come with pantographs; there are three of these cars per train set. Unlike the K-Train and CAF-Train, the C-Train reverts to the use of double-leaf sliding doors, first used on the M-Train. These trains also feature new 22-inch (559 mm) LCD TVs, like their counterparts on former KCR lines, and as a result are equipped with MTR In-Train TV, offering infotainment such as news and announcements. This will become standard for all future rolling stock ordered by the MTR.

Kwun Tong line train car types
Car type	Control cab	Traction motor	Pantograph	auto- coupler	Car length (mm)	No. of seats	Wheelchair space	Number in fleet
A control cab car	O	X	X	O	23090	45	1	28
B motor car	X	O	X	X	21600	39	3	42
C pantograph car	X	O	O	O	21600	39	3	42

=== South Island line (contract number C6554-12E - 10 sets) ===
In this configuration for the South Island line (similar to that of Alstom Metropolis), the pantograph is situated on the end cars (A car), while all three cars will have a motor each (no trailer cars). Like the converted M-Trains used on the Disneyland Resort line, these trains are fully automated, but unlike the DRL trains, the driver's cab has been replaced by extra passenger space, with an unobstructed view out the front windows (similar to that of the HKIA automated people mover). However, each train has at least one staff for patrol in the traffic hour who are able to control the train manually to comply with requirements from the Fire Services Department. The trains feature a different interior compared to the Kwun Tong Line configuration as well as a different paint scheme and headlight styling. Designed in sixteen months, all ten three-car trains are now in service.

South Island line train car types
Car type	Control panel	Traction motor	Pantograph	auto- coupler	Car length (mm)	No. of seats	Wheelchair space	Number in fleet
A control panel & pantograph car	O	O	O	O	22770	45	1	20
B motor car	X	O	X	X	21600	39	2	10

== In popular culture ==
Some damaged cars of C-Train are featured in the film Cesium Fallout, but this is historically inaccurate, as the timeline of the film precedes the introduction of the C-Train by several years.
