= Rapid transit in Hong Kong =

Rapid transit in Hong Kong began in 1979 with part of the Modified Initial System of the MTR entered service. The section, then ran only between Shek Kip Mei and Kwun Tong stations, was subsequently extended and new lines were added by the operator, the Mass Transit Railway Corporation (later renamed MTR Corporation Limited, commonly branded as MTR Corporation).

In 1983, the British Section of the Kowloon-Canton Railway (now East Rail Line of the MTR) started to be electrified. Initially resembling the common design of suburban rail, interior configuration of the EMU train cars were converted to the common design of metro or rapid transit systems, while conventional passenger trains and freight trains still run on this line. The West Rail and the Ma On Shan Rail were added to the KCR network in 2003 and 2004. All lines were leased by its former owner and operator Kowloon-Canton Railway Corporation (KCRC) to the MTR Corporation for a 50-year period from December 2007 onwards.

== See also ==
- Light Rail Transit (Hong Kong)
