= MTR fare adjustment mechanism =

The fare adjustment mechanism is a system that regulates the fare increments of public utilities, including the Mass Transit Railway Corporation Limited (MTRC). Under this mechanism, the MTR fare no longer requires approval from the Legislative Council or the Executive Council. However, this has limited the MTR's autonomy in fare setting, as the fare must be determined according to a fixed formula. Initially, the mechanism was designed to curb the rapid fare increases of the MTR through a transparent and formulaic approach. Nevertheless, Hong Kong experienced continuous inflation from 2010 to 2020, with only 2017 being exempt from a fare increase. Consequently, the annual fare hikes were widely criticized by the general public. Since 2020, there have been three years without a fare increase (2020, 2022, and 2025), and a fare reduction occurred in 2021 for the first time. This was due to the sluggish economy caused by the COVID-19 pandemic.

== Background ==
=== MTR KCR merger ===
The discussion of the merger started early in 2004, after Kowloon-Canton Railway Corporation (KCR) won MTR over the Sha Tin to Central Link deal. After two-year negotiations, the government signed a non-binding Memorandum of Understanding (MOU) with MTR on 11 April 2006, listing the changes with respect to the merger: (only some of them were listed here).

- MTR would get the KCR system Service Concession for 50 years, and KCR would get one-time payment of $4.25 billion, and $750 million plus variable profits from KCR system operation each year
- Fare Reduction on first day of merger, benefiting 2.8 million passengers; at least 10% reduction on trips cost at least $12
- No price markup until 30 June 2009 (for 2 years after merger)
- An ‘objective and transparent' fare adjustment mechanism (FAM) will be introduced

The merger package, however, still required the approval of Legislative Council on the changes of the MTR and KCR ordinance (the Rail Merger Ordinance), and also the agreement of minority shareholders of MTRC (the Government did not vote as it has conflict of interest in this issue) to finalize the merger. Those processes and then the merger completed in 2007.

== Negotiation of the mechanism ==
The 'Objective and transparent' fare adjustment mechanism mentioned above was one of the five aims of the Government on the merger. This was stated clearly in 2004 that the government invited both railway companies to discuss the possible package. MTR and KCR gave a Joint report in September that they agreed on the possibility of having a package that could fulfil the five objectives.

Previously, the right for adjustment of fares held on both companies. The fare autonomy, however, would be replaced by system that could reflect the economic situation. General public expressed their concern towards the unclear mechanism behind both companies. Worries also came from the companies that pressure from public would cause fare rise after dropping to be difficult. Agreement was reached that an equation consisted of data accessible to public (to be mentioned below) was adopted to be ‘objective and transparent’.

The whole negotiation of the merger package, including the fare adjustment system, between the Government and MTR began after the submission of joint report. However the negotiation details were in secret as negotiation ‘involves commercially sensitive information relating to the operation of the two railway corporations, including MTRCL which is a listed company’ as claimed in government documents to LegCo. The news is only leaked by some media in advance. Nevertheless, the Government did mention that the merger terms should ‘strike a balance between the interests of different stakeholders, including the travelling public, staff, taxpayers and MTRCL’s minority shareholders’.

=== Timeline ===
Time	Event
June 2002	The Government announced examination on merger possibility
24 February 2004	The Government invited MTR and KCR to discuss details of possible merger based on 5 objectives
September 2004	MTR and KCR submitted joint proposal on merger package fitting 5 objectives
11 April 2006	Executive Council approved the merger, Memorandum of Understanding (MOU) signed between the Government with MTR
8 June 2007	Rail Merger Ordinance passed by LegCo
9 October 2007	Merger Package passed with 82.3% agreement by minority shareholders of MTRC
2 December 2007	Merger completed, KCR no longer operated railway; Immediate price reduction
30 June 2009	End of ‘non-adjusting price’ period, fare adjustment started depending on the mechanism
13 June 2010	First fare adjustment based on the mechanism came on effect (+2.05%)

== Details ==
The fare adjustment mechanism is a direct-drive formula that takes changes in the Composite Consumer Price Index (CCPI), the Nominal Wage Index (NWI), and a predetermined productivity factor into account. And, the formula is as follows:

Overall Fare Adjustment Rate = 0.5 x Change in CCPI + 0.5 x Change in NWI – Productivity Factor

The government claimed that the adoption of CCPI and NWI tries to align fare adjustments with economic conditions and transportation sectors’ wage levels. As the CCPI reflects the macroeconomic environment and public affordability; whereas the NWI reflects MTR's non- managerial staff cost.

While, the productivity factor is set at zero percent before 2013, and will have a value of 0.1% starting from the 6th years took into consideration of the general reduction of MTR fares on the day of the merger in 2007. In other words, the MTR was returning the initial productivity. The 0.1% productivity factor has been so determined taking into account of the fact that the scope for productivity gain would be limited due to heavy investment by the merging of the MTR, especially when the railway network is expanding.

The mechanism is applicable to all the Controlled Fares including:

(a) Adult, Elder, Student and Child fares for one way journeys on all MTR lines, excluding the Airport Express but including Airport Workers’ fares;

(b) East Rail Line First Class Premium fares; and

(c) all Light Rail and MTR Bus fares.

According to the Operating Agreement between the Government and MTR, MTR is required to provide two independent third party certificates proving that the fare adjustments are in compliance with the mechanism. MTR is also required to formally inform the Panel on the Legislative Council and the Transport Advisory Committee three weeks before the implementation of the new fares in June every year. If the outcome of the calculations on the overall adjustment under the formula is within the range of ±1.5%, there shall be no overall fare adjustment of the MTR.

== Result of the mechanism ==
The mechanism has been successfully implemented in 2009 and proposed a 0.7% increase in the fare according to the calculation of the formula. However, the MTR fare remained unchanged in 2009 since the outcome stayed within the range of ±1.5%. The effect shall be carried over to the next year and subjected to annual review.

On 25 March 2010, According to the mechanism, the adjustments in MTR fare will be decided by the Composite Consumer Price index as of December 2009 and the nominal wage indices of the transportation sectors. The Census and Statistics Department has announced the former indicator was 1.3% while the latter was 1.4%, combined the effect from last year, the overall increase in MTR fare will be (1.35% + 0.7%) = 2.05%. The first adjustment was in effect on 13 June 2010.

On 24 March 2011, According to the Census and Statistics Department, the Composite Consumer Price Index in 2010 has increased by 3.1% compared with the same quarter/ month in 2009. The data was later reduced to 2.9% due to the modification of the component of the Composite Consumer Price Index. The percentage change of the nominal wage indices of the transportation sector in 2010 is +1.5% compared to December 2009. The percentage increase in MTR fare in 2011 will be 2.2% and was effective since 19 June 2011.

On 26 March 2012, with reference to the data issued by the Census and Statistics Department, the proposed increase in the fare shall be 5.4% and effective since 17 June 2012

On 26 March 2013, a new term called ‘Productivity Factor’ has been added to the formula of the adjustment mechanism, the value of the factor was set to be -0.1% according to the MTR KCR merger Bill. The value of the factor was then revised up to -0.6% in April 2013 during the review of the MTR fare mechanism in order to further alleviate the financial burden of the passengers. Overall, the CCPI was +3.7% and NWI is +2.9% in 2012 and the proposed increase in MTR fare shall be 2.7% and effective since 30 June 2013.

On 27 March 2014, with reference to the data issued by the Census and Statistics Department, after deducting 0.6% from the productivity factor, the proposed increase in the fare shall be 3.6% and effective since 29 June 2014.

On 27 March 2015, with reference to the data issued by the Census and Statistics Department, after deducting 0.6% from the productivity factor, the proposed increase in the fare shall be 4.3% and effective since 21 June 2015.

On 21 January 2016, according to the Census and Statistics Department, the CCPI in 2015 has increased by 2.5% and then revised to 2.4% due to the modification of the component of the CCPI. The percentage change of the NWI of the transportation sector in 2010 is +4.1% compared to December 2015. The percentage increase in MTR fare in 2016 will be 2.65% and was effective since 26 June 2016.

Time period	CCPI	NWI	Productivity Factor	Increase and decrease rates set by the MTR	Proposed increase in fare	∆ in monthly household income	Affordability discount	Actual increase in fare	Fare adjustment date
2009	+2.1%	-0.7%	0	N/A	+0.7%	N/A	N/A	0%	N/A
2010	+1.3%	+1.4%	0	N/A	+1.35%	N/A	N/A	+2.05%	June 13, 2010
2011	+2.9%	+1.5%	0	N/A	+2.2%	N/A	N/A	+2.2%	June 19, 2011
2012	+5.7%	+5.1%	0	N/A	+5.4%	N/A	N/A	+5.4%	June 17, 2012
2013	+3.7%	+2.9%	-0.6%	N/A	+2.7%	+5.5%	0	+2.7%	June 30, 2013
2014	+4.3%	+4.1%	-0.6%	N/A	+3.6%	+6.16%	0	+3.6%	June 29, 2014
2015	+4.9%	+4.9%	-0.6%	N/A	+4.3%	+6.67%	0	+4.3%	June 21, 2015
2016	+2.4%	+4.1%	-0.6%	-0.6%, plus a 10% deduction for any increase or decrease	+2.65%	+3.33%	0	+2.65%	June 26, 2016
2017	+1.2%	+3.3%	0	-0.6%	+1.49%	+7.49%	N/A	0%	N/A
2018	+1.7%	+2.8%	0	-0.6%	+1.65%	+4.4%	0	+3.14%	June 30, 2018
2019	+2.5%	+5.9%	0	-0.6%	+3.6%	+3.3%	0.3%	+3.3%	June 30, 2019
2020	+2.9%	+3.4%	0	-0.6%	+2.55%	-2.48%	-2.55%	0%	N/A
2021	-1.0%	-1.5%	0	-0.6%	-1.85%	-7.19%	0%	-1.85%	June 27, 2021
2022	+2.4%	-0.2%	0	-0.6%	+0.5%	+7.78%	N/A	0%	N/A
2023	+2.0%	+3.6%	-0.8%	-0.2%	+1.8%	+2.84%	0%	+2.3%	June 25, 2023
2024	+2.4%	+5.2%	-0.6%	0	+3.2%	+3.09%	-0.11%	+3.09%	June 30, 2024
2025	+1.4%	+3.1%	-0.8%	0	+1.45%	-1.33%	0%	0%	N/A

== Review of the mechanism ==
=== 2013 ===
The Government has reviewed the fare adjustment mechanism with the MTR in 2013. According to the report from Legislative Council, there are two main purposes for introducing a new fare adjustment mechanism, which are:

(1) incorporating new considerations, such as the profitability of company, performance and affordability of the public into the fare adjustment formula.

(2) alleviating the fare burden on medium to long-distance passengers.

The MTR introduced various measures and arrangements in June 2013, in order to cater needs of different passengers. These measures include:

(1) changing the Productivity Factor value in the objective method. Under this new calculation, the Productivity Factor value was increased from by using a more transparent and 0.1% to 0.6%. As a result, the percentage increase of the fare at 2013 is reduced by 0.5%, from +3.2% to +2.7%;

(2) introducing an affordability cap which will be changed according to the Median Monthly Household Income (MMHI). The fare adjustment rate can not exceed the percentage change of MMHI in the same year.

(3) introducing “service performance" arrangement, which means that the MTR have to pay a penalty charge for its bad performance. The sum collected through this arrangement and the new “profit-sharing” mechanism will be returned to the passengers by a "10% Same Day Second Trip Discount" scheme. Also, the MTR introduces new types of passes for frequent passengers who travel from medium to long-distance. The government claimed that the adjusted mechanism and those arrangements enable the MTR to maintain the financial stability while bearing the social responsibility.

=== 2023 ===
In 2023, changes to the MTR fare mechanism were introduced, linking the calculation to property development profits of the MTR Corporation. The productivity factor will vary depending on the level of profits.

== Criticism of the mechanism ==
Both the public and legislators have criticised the fare adjustment mechanism.

Although the MTR set a cap on the fares in accordance with the MMHI, the exceed percentage is allowed to recoup in the following years. The arrangement appears to be a discount for the passenger, however, it just stops the steep rises each year by distributing the fare rise into several years.

The major criticism of the mechanism is that it provides a legitimate reason for the MTR to raise fare, regardless of its own social responsibility and also the affordability of passengers. Although the MTR Corporation is a listed company and should theoretically consider the interests of their shareholders only, the HKSAR government holds a 76% shares in it. And it could actually play a more active role in the pricing policies of the MTR. While the MTR is getting a net profit of around $15 billion every year as the city's sole operator of railway services, subsidised with property development income, the fares increased every year from 2009 to 2020, which was considered as unacceptable in the eye of public.

Worse still, there is always a vicious cycle working within the mechanism. The fare increase would affect other transportation companies, such as The Kowloon Motor Bus and the mini buses companies. When the cost of transportation in general increases, the Composite consumer price index, as a major component in the whole mechanism will also increase, which lead to a fare rise again at the end. As Dr Hung Wing-tat from Polytechnic University concludes, ‘Government, despite its promise, had failed to take affordability for the public and the railway's profitability into account in the new system.’

== See also ==
- MTR
