= MTR =

Rapid transit system in Hong Kong

Mass Transit Railway (MTR)
- The MTR logo since 1996

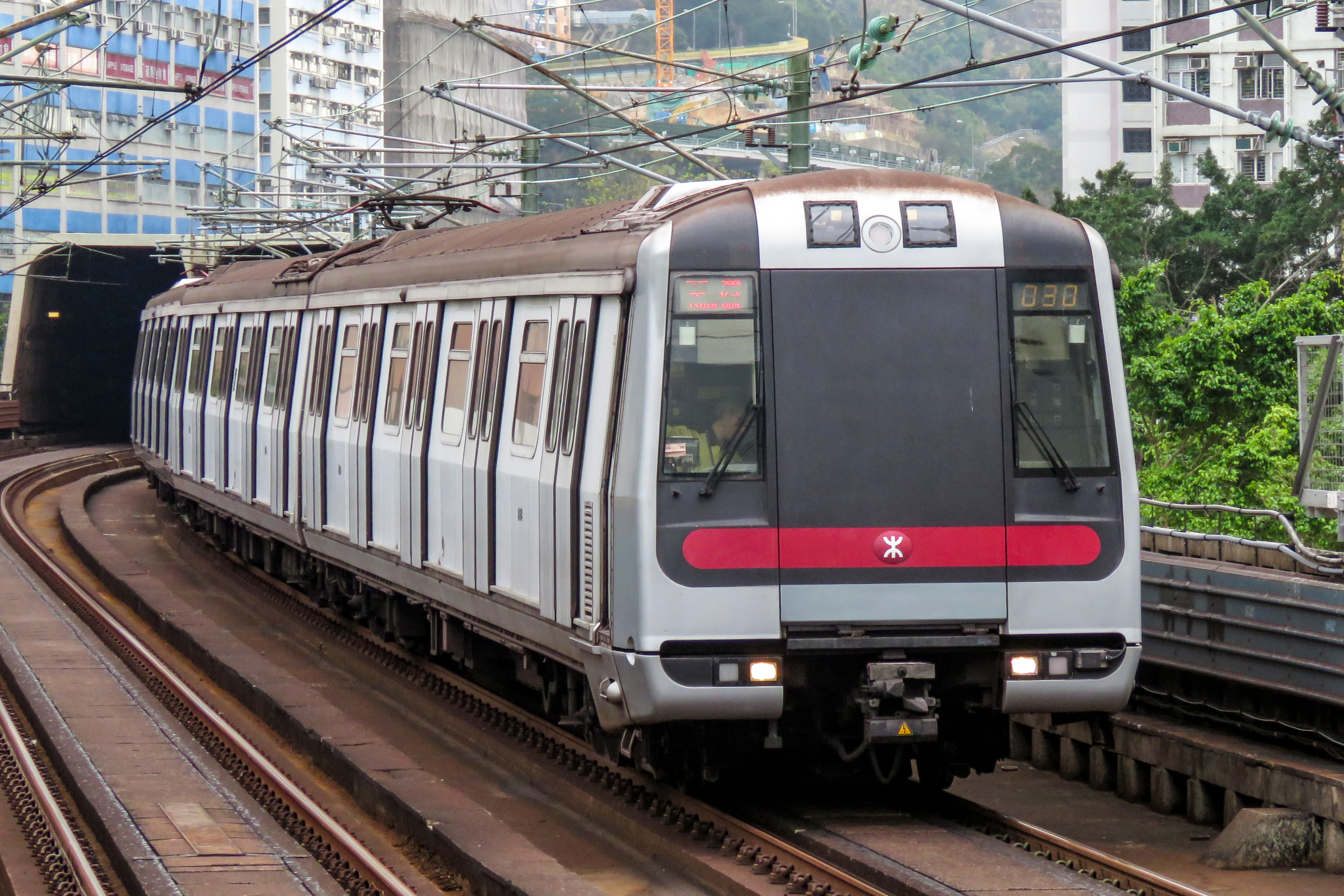
- A Tsuen Wan Line M-Train approaching Kwai Hing station

Overview
- Native name: 港鐵 (Chinese)
- Owner: MTR Corporation (Most lines); KCR Corporation (Tuen Ma Line, East Rail Line, and the Light Rail)
- Locale: Hong Kong
- Transit type: Inter-city rail; High-speed rail; Light rail; Rapid transit; MTR Bus
- Number of lines: Rapid transit: 10; Light rail: 12
- Number of stations: Rapid transit: 99; Light rail: 68; High-speed rail: 1
- Daily ridership: November 2023: 4,823,000 (city metro lines only, without cross border passengers); 5,764,000 (All rail transport, including light rail and high speed rail)
- Annual ridership: January 2023 to December 2023; 1,586,646,000 (city metro lines only, without cross border passengers); 1,896,798,000 (all rail transport, including light rail and high speed rail)
- Website: mtr.com.hk

Operation
- Began operation: 1 October 1910; 116 years ago (British Section of KCR opened); 1 October 1979; 47 years ago (MTR's Modified Initial System opened); 2 December 2007; 18 years ago (MTR and KCR operations merged)
- Operator: MTR Corporation

Technical
- System length: Heavy rail: 209.1 km (129.9 mi); Light rail: 36.2 km (22.5 mi)
- Track gauge: 1,435 mm (4 ft 8 1/2 in) standard gauge (East Rail line, Tuen Ma line, South Island line, Light Rail and line extensions after 2014); 1,432 mm (4 ft 8 3/8 in) almost-standard gauge (all other lines)

Mass Transit Railway (MTR)
- Traditional Chinese: 港鐵
- Simplified Chinese: 港铁
- Jyutping: gong^{2} tit^{3}
- Cantonese Yale: Góngtit
- Literal meaning: "(Hong) Kong railway"
Transcriptions
Standard Mandarin
- Hanyu Pinyin: Gǎngtiě
- IPA: [kǎŋ tʰjè]
Hakka
- Romanization: Kóng-Thiet
Yue: Cantonese
- Yale Romanization: Góngtit
- Jyutping: gong^{2} tit^{3}
- IPA: [kɔŋ˧˥ tʰit̚˧]
Southern Min
- Tâi-lô: Káng-thih

The Mass Transit Railway (Note: Chinese: 港鐵; pinyin: Gǎngtiě; Jyutping: gong^{2} tit^{3}), known locally by the initialism MTR, is a rapid transit system in Hong Kong and the territory's principal mode of railway transportation. Operated by the MTR Corporation (MTRCL), it consists of heavy rail, light rail and feeder bus services, centred around a 10-line rapid transit network, serving the urbanised areas of Hong Kong Island, Kowloon, and the New Territories. The system encompasses 245.3 km (152.4 mi) of railways, as of December 2022, with 179 stations—including 99 heavy rail stations, 68 light rail stops and 1 high-speed rail terminus.

Under the government's rail-led transport policy, the MTR system is a common mode of public transport in Hong Kong, with over five and a half million trips made on an average weekday consistently achieving a 99.9% punctuality rate on its arrivals and departures. As of 2025, the MTR holds a 50.2% share of the franchised public transport market, making it the most popular transport option in Hong Kong. The integration of the Octopus card fare-payment technology into the MTR system in September 1997 has further facilitated commuting.

== History ==
=== Initial proposals ===
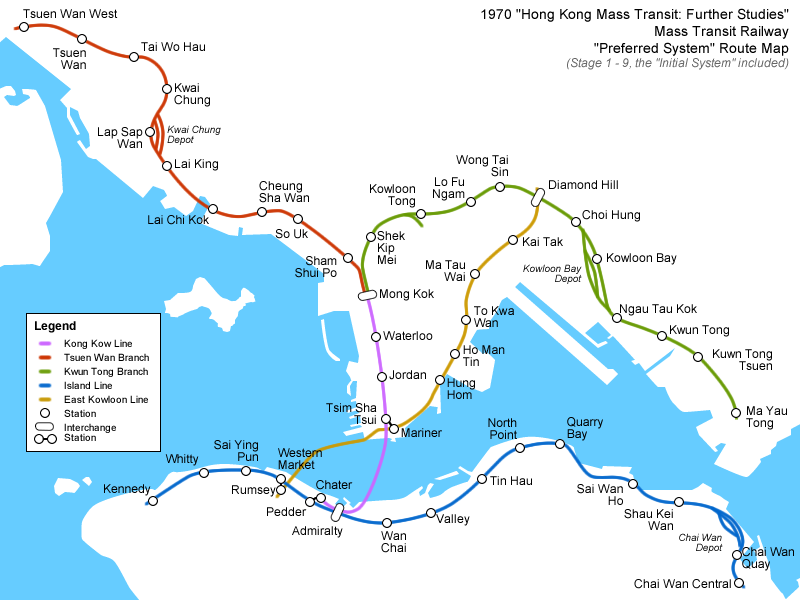
"Preferred system" route map in 1970

During the 1960s, the government of Hong Kong saw a need to accommodate increasing road traffic as Hong Kong's economy grew rapidly. In 1966, British transport consultants Freeman, Fox, Wilbur Smith & Associates were appointed to study the transport system of Hong Kong. The study was based on the projection of the population of Hong Kong for 1986, estimated at 6,868,000. On 1 September 1967, the consultants submitted the Hong Kong Mass Transport Study to the government, which recommended the construction of a 40-mile (64 km) rapid transit rail system in Hong Kong. The study suggested that four rail lines be developed in six stages, with a completion date set between December 1973 and December 1984. Detailed locations of lines and stations were presented in the study. These four lines were the Kwun Tong line (from Mong Kok to Ma Yau Tong), Tsuen Wan line (from Admiralty to Tsuen Wan), Island line (from Kennedy to Chai Wan Central), and Shatin line (from Tsim Sha Tsui to Wo Liu Hang).

The study was submitted to the Legislative Council on 14 February 1968. The consultants received new data from the 1966 by-census on 6 March 1968. A short supplementary report was submitted on 22 March 1968 and amended in June 1968. The by-census indicated that the projected 1986 population was reduced by more than one million from the previous estimate to 5,647,000. The dramatic reduction affected town planning. The population distribution was largely different from the original study. The projected 1986 populations of Castle Peak New Town, Sha Tin New Town, and, to a lesser extent, Tsuen Wan New Town, were revised downwards, and the plan for a new town in Tseung Kwan O was shelved. In this updated scenario, the consultants reduced the scale of the recommended system. The supplementary report stated that the originally suggested four tracks between Admiralty station and Mong Kok station should be reduced to two, and only parts of the Island line, Tsuen Wan line, and Kwun Tong line should be constructed for the initial system. The other lines would be placed in the list of extensions. This report led to the final study in 1970.

In 1970, a revised system with four lines was laid out in the British consultants' new report, Hong Kong Mass Transit: Further Studies. The four lines were to be the Kwun Tong line, Tsuen Wan line, Island line, and East Kowloon line. The lines that were eventually constructed were somewhat different compared to those presented in this report and the Hong Kong Mass Transport Study.

In 1972, the Hong Kong government authorised construction of the Initial System, a 20-kilometre (12 mi) system that roughly translates to today's Kwun Tong line between Kwun Tong and Prince Edward, Tsuen Wan line between Mei Foo and Admiralty, and Island line between Sheung Wan and Admiralty. The Mass Transit Steering Committee, chaired by the Financial Secretary Philip Haddon-Cave, began negotiations with four major construction consortia in 1973. The government's intention was to tender the entire project, based on the British design, as a single tender at a fixed price. A consortium from Japan, led by Mitsubishi, submitted the only proposal within the government's $5-billion price ceiling. They signed an agreement to construct the system in early 1974, but in December of the same year, pulled out of the agreement for reasons stemming from fears of the oil crisis.

=== Modified initial system ===
Modified Initial System's route map

Several weeks later, in early 1975, the Mass Transit Steering Group was replaced by the Mass Transport Provisional Authority, which held more executive powers. It announced that the Initial System would be reduced to 15.6 kilometres (9.7 mi) and renamed the "Modified Initial System" (now part of the Kwun Tong and Tsuen Wan lines). Plans for a single contract were abandoned in favour of 25 engineering contracts and 10 electrical and mechanical contracts. On 7 May 1975 the Legislative Council passed legislation setting up the government-owned Mass Transit Railway Corporation (MTRC) to replace the Mass Transport Provisional Authority, the Mass Transit Railway Ordinance.

Construction of the system began on 11 November 1975. The northern section was completed on 30 September 1979 and was opened on 1 October 1979 by Governor Murray MacLehose. Trains on this route ran from Shek Kip Mei to Kwun Tong in Phase 1, Tsim Sha Tsui to Kwun Tong in Phase 2 in December 1979, and Chater to Kwun Tong in the last phase, initially in a four-car configuration. The first train drivers were trained on the London Underground. It was designed by a consortium of consultants led by Freeman Fox and Partners. On later extensions to the railway the stations were designed under the supervision of Roland Paoletti, the chief architect at MTR.

The full Modified Initial System was opened on 12 February 1980 by Princess Alexandra, who rode the inaugural train through the immersed tube beneath Victoria Harbour to Central station. Trains were gradually extended to six cars to accommodate an increase in passenger numbers.

=== Line extensions ===
Development of Hong Kong's railways (MTR)

The government approved construction of the Tsuen Wan line in 1977, then known as the Tsuen Wan Extension, and works commenced in November 1978. The project added a 10.5-kilometre (6.5 mi) section to the MTR system, from Prince Edward station to Tsuen Wan. The line started service on 17 May 1982 with a total cost of construction (not adjusted for inflation) of HK$4.1 billion (US$526 million). The plan was modified from that in the 1970 report Hong Kong Mass Transit: Further Studies, with Kwai Chung station, Lap Sap Wan station, and a planned depot in Kwai Chung next to Lap Sap Wan station being replaced by stations in Kwai Hing and Kwai Fong and a depot in Tsuen Wan. Several stations also had names different to that during planning: So Uk station became Cheung Sha Wan, Cheung Sha Wan became Lai Chi Kok, and Lai Chi Kok became Lai Wan (later renamed Mei Foo).

When service of this line started, the section of the Kwun Tong line from Chater to Argyle (since renamed Central and Mong Kok respectively) was transferred to the Tsuen Wan line. Thus, Waterloo station (since renamed Yau Ma Tei) became the terminus of the Kwun Tong line, and both Argyle and Prince Edward stations became interchange stations. This change was made because system planners expected the patronage of the Tsuen Wan line to exceed that of the Kwun Tong line. This forecast proved to be accurate, necessitating a bypass from the northwestern New Territories to Hong Kong Island. The Tung Chung line was therefore launched in 1998 with an interchange station at Lai King for that purpose.

Although land acquisitions were made for a station at Tsuen Wan West (near Tsuen King Circuit), beyond Tsuen Wan station, as part of the Tsuen Wan branch, the station was never built. This is not to be confused with the modern-day Tsuen Wan West station on Tuen Ma line, which lies on a newly reclaimed area near the former ferry pier.

Since opening in 1982, the Tsuen Wan line is the line whose alignment has remained the same for the longest time. For example, the Kwun Tong line's alignment has changed three times since its opening—the taking over of Tsuen Wan line from Mong Kok to Central, the taking over of Eastern Harbour Crossing section by the Tseung Kwan O line, and its extension to Whampoa.

Government approvals were granted for construction of the Island line in December 1980. Construction commenced in October 1981. On 31 May 1985, the Island line was opened with service between Admiralty station and Chai Wan station. Both Admiralty and Central stations became interchange stations with the Tsuen Wan line. Furthermore, each train was extended to eight cars. On 23 May 1986, the Island line was extended to Sheung Wan station. Construction was delayed for one year, as government offices which were located over the station had to be moved before the construction could start.

In 1984, the government approved the construction of the Eastern Harbour Crossing, a tunnel to be used by cars and MTR trains. The Kwun Tong line was extended across the harbour on 5 August 1989 to Quarry Bay station, which became an interchange station for the Kwun Tong line and the Island line. An intermediate station, Lam Tin, started operations on 1 October 1989.

=== Airport connection ===
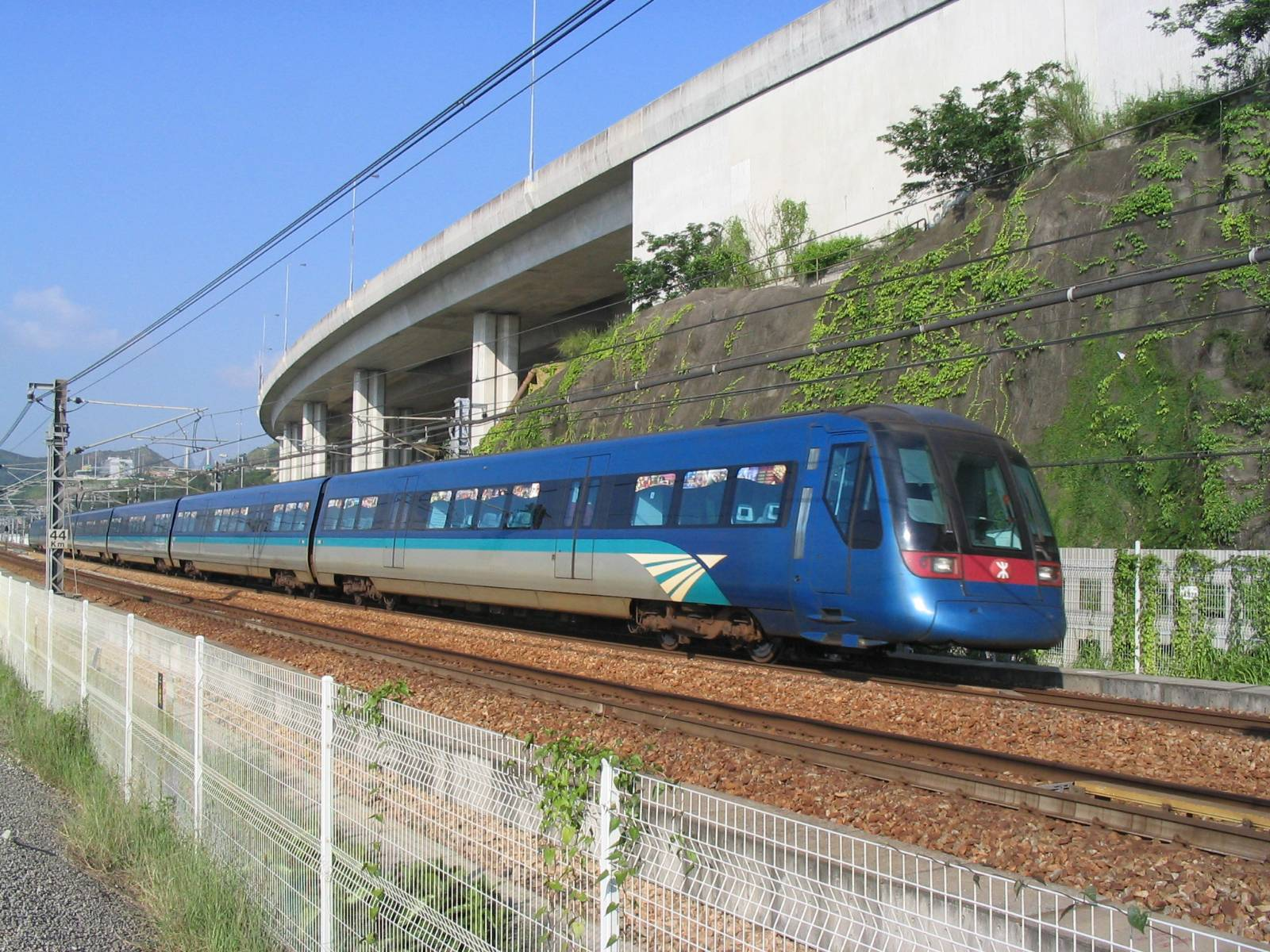
An Airport Express train

The decision was made in October 1989 to construct a new international airport at Chek Lap Kok on Lantau Island to replace the overcrowded Kai Tak International Airport. The government invited the MTRC to build a train line, then known as the Lantau Airport Railway, to the airport. Construction started in November 1994, after the Chinese and British governments settled their financial and land disagreements.

The new line was included in the financing plans of the new Hong Kong International Airport as the airport was not considered viable without direct public transport links. Construction costs were also shared by the MTRC, which was granted many large-scale developments in the construction plans for the new stations.

The Lantau Airport Railway included two MTR lines, the Tung Chung line and the Airport Express. The Tung Chung line was officially opened on 21 June 1998 by Hong Kong Chief Executive Tung Chee-hwa, and service commenced the next day. The Airport Express opened for service on 6 July 1998 along with the new Hong Kong International Airport.

The Airport Express also offers flight check-in facilities at Kowloon station and Hong Kong station—the in-town check-ins offer a more convenient and time-saving routine; a free shuttle bus service transports travellers from these stations to their respective hotels as well. Porters are also available to help transport luggage from and onto trains. It is the second most popular means of transport to the airport after buses. In 2012, it had a 21.8 per cent of share of the traffic to and from the airport. However, this has declined from a peak of 32 per cent in 1999.

=== Tseung Kwan O line ===
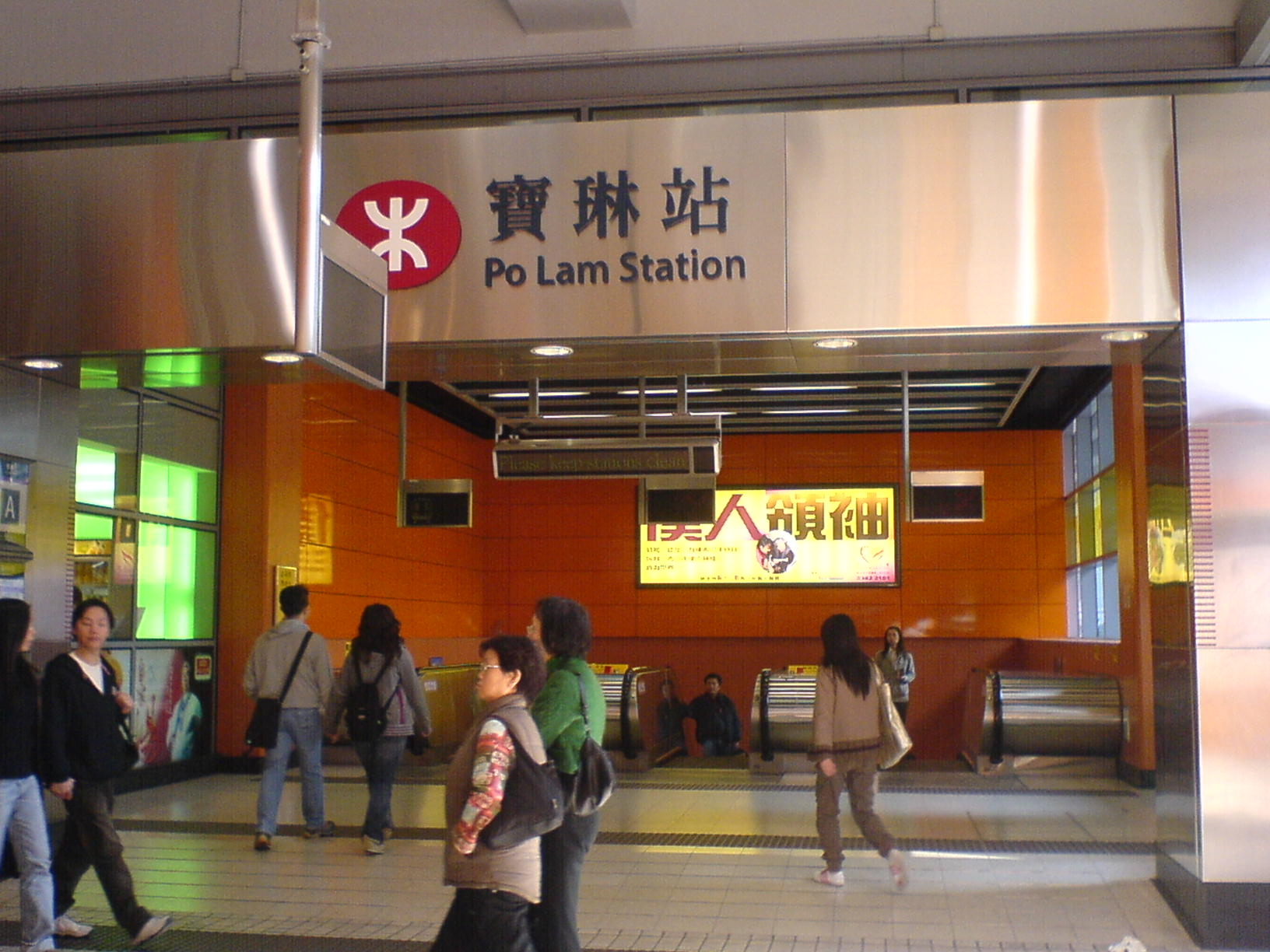
The Tseung Kwan O line was opened in 2002 to serve new housing developments. Pictured is Po Lam station, the northern terminus of the line.

The Quarry Bay Congestion Relief Works extended the Hong Kong Island end of the Kwun Tong line from Quarry Bay to North Point via a pair of 2.1-kilometre (1.3 mi) tunnels. The project was initiated due to overcrowding at Quarry Bay and persistent passenger complaints about the five-minute walk from the Island line platforms to the Kwun Tong line platform. Construction began in September 1997 and was completed in September 2001 at a cost of HK$3.1 billion. As with most earlier interchange stations, a cross-platform interchange arrangement was provided here in both directions.

Construction of the Tseung Kwan O line (called the Tseung Kwan O extension line in the planning stage) was approved on 18 August 1998 to serve the growing Tseung Kwan O New Town. Construction began on 24 April 1999 and the line officially opened in 2002. It took over the existing Kwun Tong line tracks running through the Eastern Harbour Tunnel, so that the full line stretches from Po Lam to North Point. When the line opened, the Kwun Tong line was extended to Tiu Keng Leng on the new line. Construction costs were partly covered by the Hong Kong Government and private developers which linked construction of the Tseung Kwan O line to new real estate and commercial developments.

=== Interchange stations ===
The multiple cross-platform-interchange system between Tiu Keng Leng station and Yau Tong station

The interchange between the Kwun Tong line and the Tsuen Wan line (except Yau Ma Tei) as well as that between the Kwun Tong line and the Tseung Kwan O line, are two stations long, allowing cross-platform interchange wherein a passenger leaves a train on one side of the platform and boards trains on the other side of the platform for another line. For example, when passengers are travelling on the Kwun Tong line towards Tiu Keng Leng, getting off at Yau Tong would allow them to switch trains across the platform for the Tseung Kwan O line towards North Point. Whereas, staying on the train and reaching Tiu Keng Leng would allow them to board the Tseung Kwan O line trains towards Po Lam/LOHAS Park. This design makes interchanging more convenient and passengers do not have the need to change to different levels. However this interchange arrangement is not available for all transferring passengers at Kowloon Tong, Central, Hong Kong, Quarry Bay, Nam Cheong (except transfer between Tuen Mun and Hong Kong bound trains), Mei Foo, Tai Wai (only between southbound Tuen Ma line and East Rail line trains) and Sunny Bay (except transfer between Tung Chung and Disneyland Resort bound trains) stations, mainly because this service is available only when there are two continuous stations shared as interchange stations by two lines.

Two major works were undertaken to ease interchange between the Kwun Tong line and East Rail line. The modification of Kowloon Tong station started in June 2001. A new pedestrian link to Kowloon Tong station southern concourse and a new entrance (Exit D) opened on 15 April 2004 to cope with the increase in interchange passenger flow. Modification to Tsim Sha Tsui station involved upgrading station facilities and concourse layout to facilitate access from the East Tsim Sha Tsui station via its pedestrian links. (Note: Tsim Sha Tsui and East Tsim Sha Tsui are two separate stations, so one single journey ticket cannot be used for interchange between them. It is only possible to interchange with an Octopus card, or get a second ticket. Passengers with only one ticket can interchange at Kowloon Tong station (Kwun Tong and East Rail lines), then interchange at Hung Hom (for Tuen Ma line) or Mong Kok (for Tsuen Wan line).) New entrances to the subway links were opened on 19 September 2004 (Exit G) and 30 March 2005 (Exit F), with the whole scheme completed in May 2005.

=== Disneyland Resort line ===
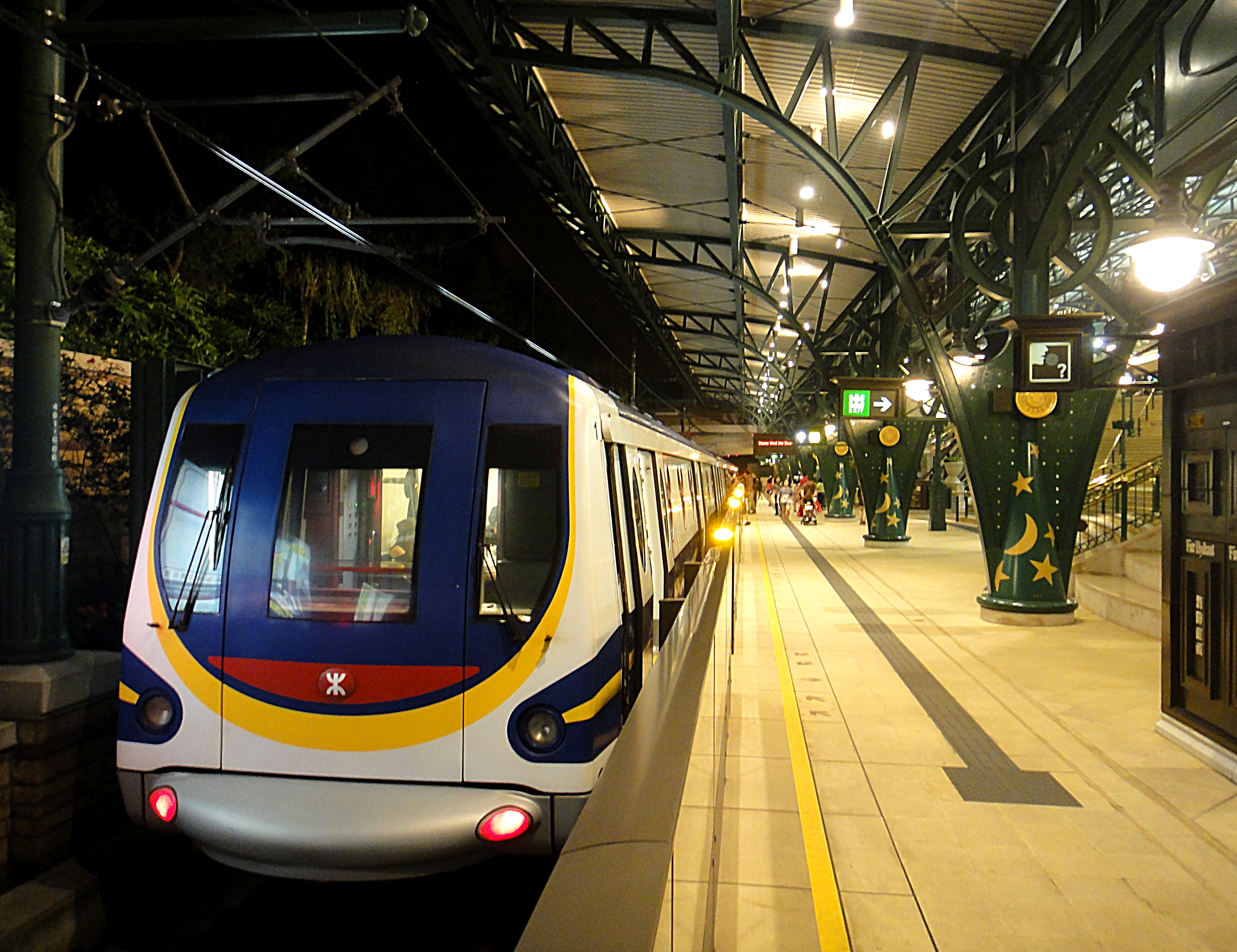
A Disneyland Resort line train at Disneyland Resort station

The Disneyland Resort line, previously known as Penny's Bay Rail Link, provides service to the Hong Kong Disneyland Resort station which was opened on 12 September 2005. Services to Sunny Bay station on the Tung Chung line started on 1 June 2005, but it was only opened to staff of Disneyland at first. It was finally opened to the general public two months later, on 8 August 2005. The new line and the Disneyland Resort station opened on 1 August 2005. It is a 3.5-kilometre (2.2 mi) single-track railway that runs between Sunny Bay station and Disneyland Resort station. The Disneyland Resort station itself was designed to blend in with the ambiance of the resort. The line operates fully automated trains running every four to ten minutes without a driver. The carriages are refurbished M-train rolling stock to match the recreational and adventurous nature of the 3.5-minute journey. In 2028, the line is expected to be retrofitted with CRRC Qingdao Sifang trains.

=== Airport Express extension ===
The AsiaWorld–Expo station is an extension of the Airport Express serving a new international exhibition centre, AsiaWorld–Expo, at Hong Kong International Airport. The station opened on 20 December 2005 along with the exhibition centre. To cope with the projected increase in patronage, Airport Express trains were lengthened to eight cars from the previous seven. Additional trains are also deployed on the Tung Chung line during major exhibitions and events.

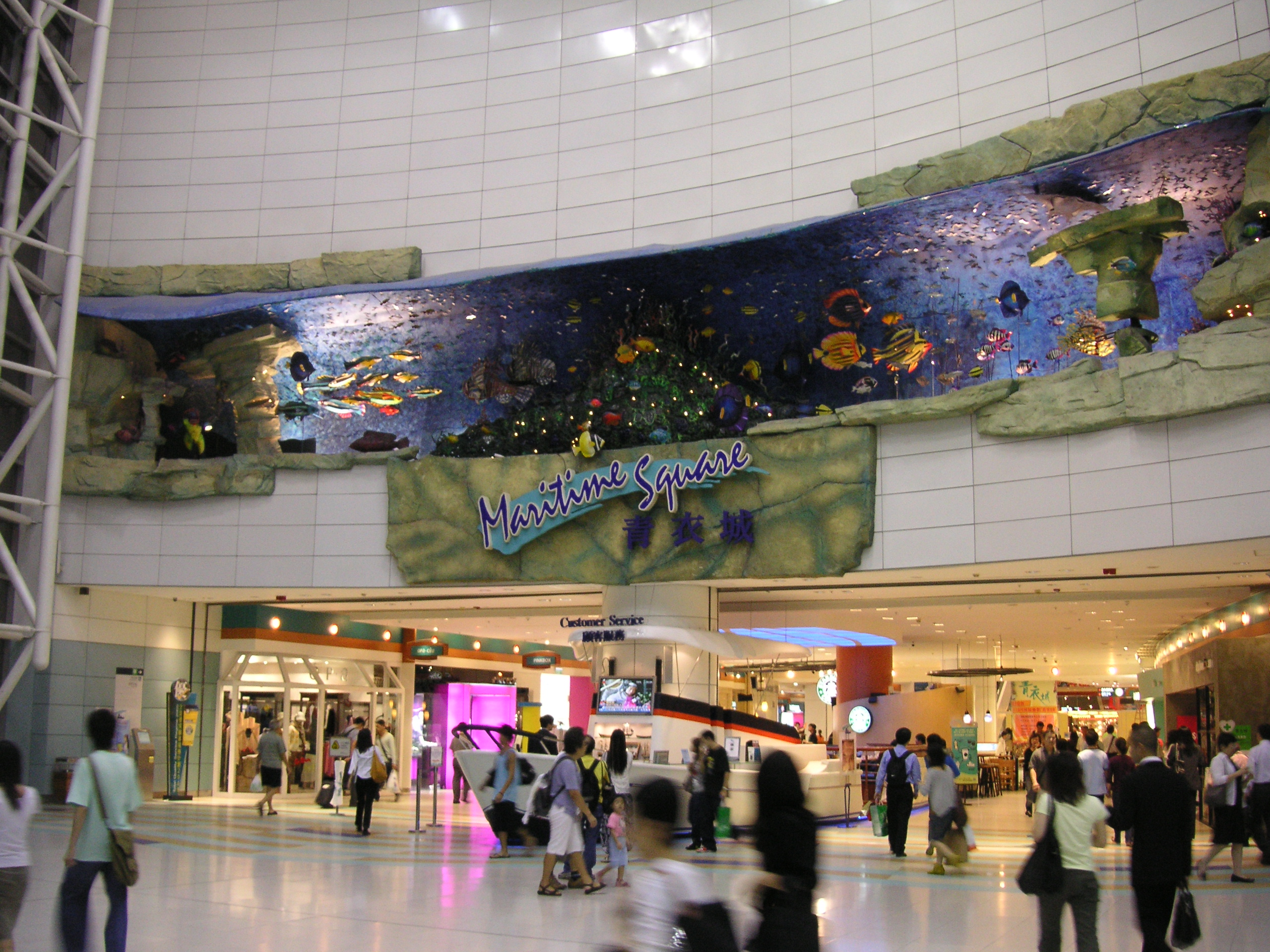
Maritime Square, one of the major properties financing the MTR

=== Partial privatisation and merger ===
On 5 October 2000 the operator of the MTR network, the Mass Transit Railway Corporation (MTRC), became Hong Kong's first rail company to be partially privatized, marking the beginning of the Hong Kong government's initiative to reduce its interests in public utilities. Prior to its listing on the Hong Kong Stock Exchange, the Mass Transit Railway Corporation (MTRC) was wholly owned by the Hong Kong government. The offering involved the sale of about one billion shares, and the company now has the largest shareholder base of any company listed in Hong Kong. In June 2001, MTRCL was transferred to the Hang Seng Index.

MTRCL has often developed properties next to stations to complement its profitable railway business. Many recently built stations were incorporated into large housing estates or shopping complexes. For example, Tsing Yi station is built next to the Maritime Square shopping centre and directly underneath the Tierra Verde housing estate.

On 11 April 2006, MTRCL signed a non-binding memorandum of understanding with the Hong Kong government, the owner of Kowloon–Canton Railway Corporation, to merge the operation of the two railway networks in Hong Kong in spite of the strong opposition of KCRC staff. The minority shareholders of the corporation approved the proposal at an extraordinary general meeting on 9 October 2007, allowing MTRCL to take over the operation of the KCR network and combine the fare system of the two networks on 2 December 2007.

On 2 December 2007 the Kowloon-Canton Railway Corporation (KCRC) granted a 50-year service concession (which may be extended) of the KCR network to MTRCL, in return for making annual payments to KCRC, thereby merging the railway operations of the two corporations under MTRCL's management. At the same time MTRCL changed its Chinese name from "地下鐵路有限公司" (Subway Limited Company) to "香港鐵路有限公司" (Hong Kong Railway Limited Company), but left its English name unchanged; at the same time the system's Chinese name changed from "地鐵" ("underground railway") to "港鐵" ("Hong Kong Railway"). After the merger, the MTR network included three more lines—East Rail line, West Rail line, and Ma On Shan line (now merged into the Tuen Ma line)—as well as the light rail network and Guangdong through train to Guangzhou.

On 28 September 2008, fare zones of all urban lines, East Rail line, Ma On Shan line, and West Rail line were merged. A passenger could travel on these networks with only one ticket, except where a transfer is made between Tsim Sha Tsui and East Tsim Sha Tsui stations, where two tickets are required. Student discounts on Octopus Card were also issued.

=== Recent extensions ===
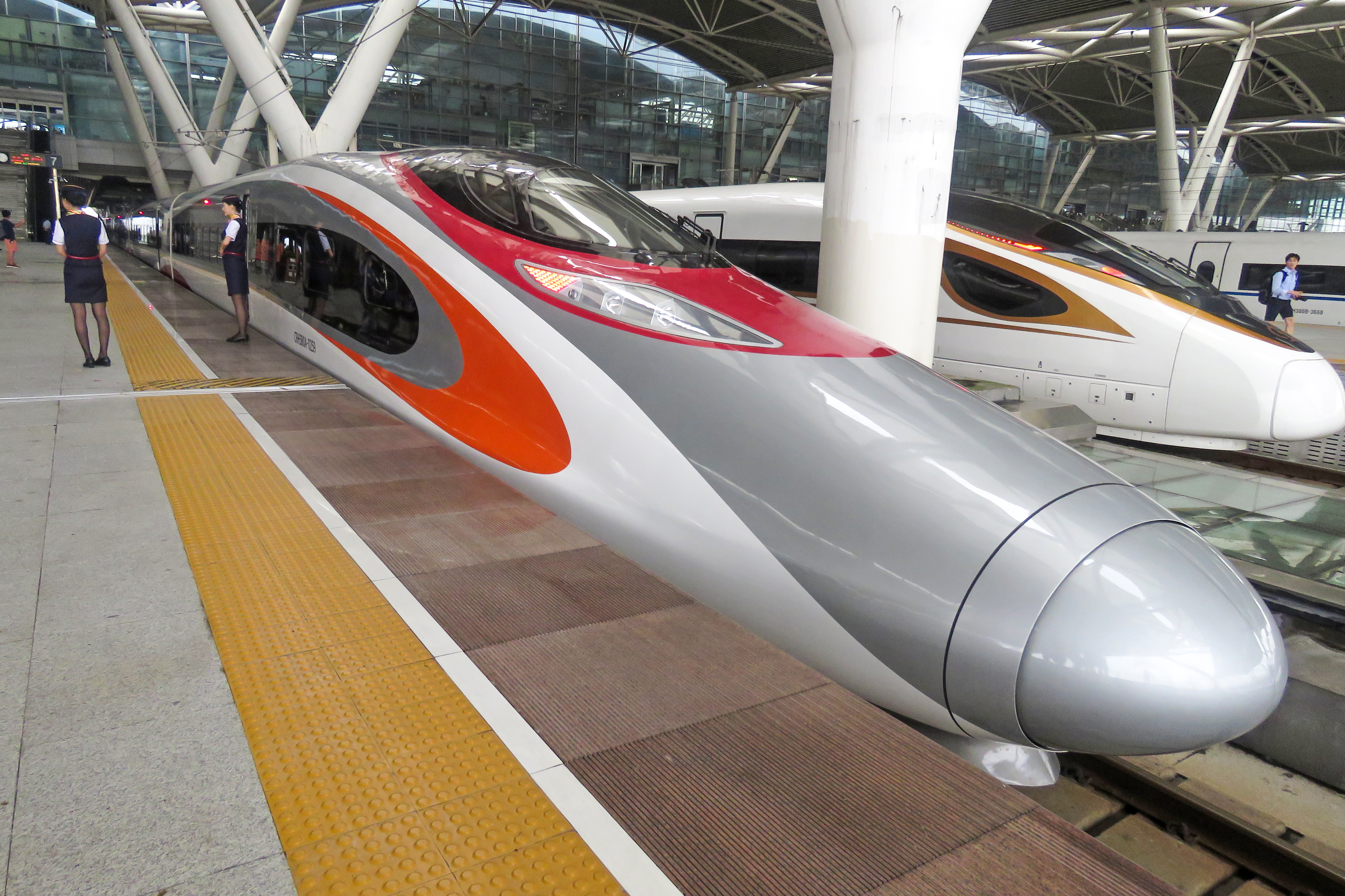
MTR's high-speed rail service was launched on 23 September 2018. The image shows an MTR Vibrant Express train at Guangzhou South railway station.

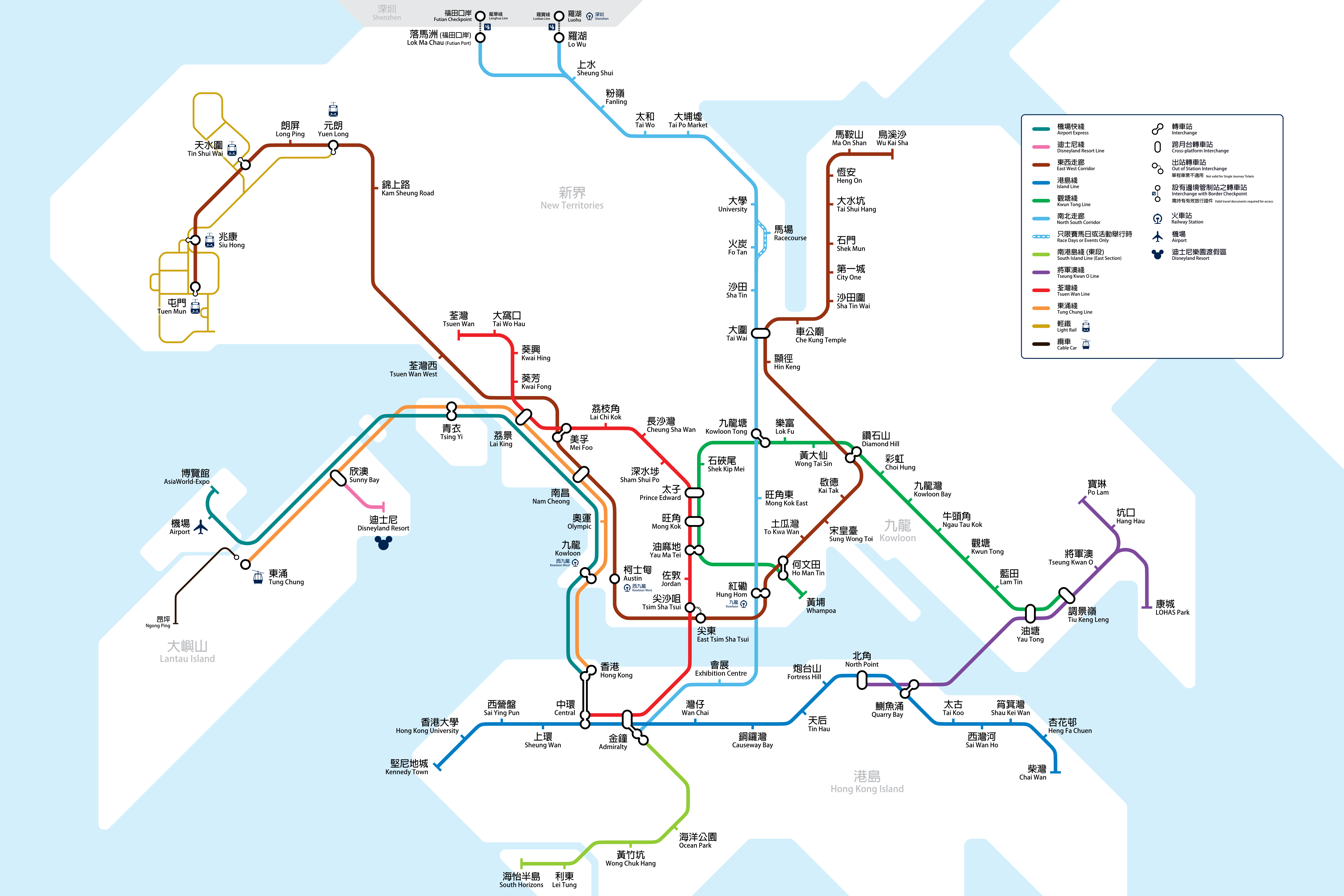
The current MTR map as of 2026

The MTR system has been extended numerous times since the railway merger. Relevant projects include the LOHAS Park spur line (2009), the Kowloon Southern Link (2009), the West Island line (2014), the Kwun Tong line extension (2016), the South Island line (2016), Tuen Ma line Phase 1 (2020) and Phase 2 (2021) and the East Rail line extension (2022).

The LOHAS Park Spur Line is an extension of the Tseung Kwan O line, splitting off after Tseung Kwan O station. It serves the new residential development of LOHAS Park (formerly "Dream City"), a 3,550,000-square-foot (330,000 m^{2}) estate with fifty residential towers. The project is divided into 9 to 13 phases and is about halfway complete as of 2016. These high rises sit above LOHAS Park station, which opened on 26 July 2009.

The West Island line, first put forward to the government on 21 January 2003, is an extension of the Island line. It serves the Western District of Hong Kong Island. The construction of the West Island line started on 10 August 2009. Kennedy Town station and HKU station opened on 28 December 2014. Sai Ying Pun station opened later, on 29 March 2015, due to construction delays.

A proposal to extend the existing Kwun Tong line to Whampoa Garden was made in April 2006 and approved in March 2008 as part of the bid for the Sha Tin to Central Link. Two new stations at Whampoa and Ho Man Tin opened on 23 October 2016.

The South Island line opened on 28 December 2016 between Admiralty and South Horizons, linking the MTR to Southern District for the first time. With the opening of the South Island line, all 18 districts of Hong Kong are served by the MTR.

The first section of the Tuen Ma line, an extension of the former Ma On Shan line connecting Tai Wai via Hin Keng and Diamond Hill to Kai Tak station, opened on 14 February 2020. The second and final section of the line was completed and opened on 27 June 2021, linking the previously opened Tuen Ma Line Phase One and the West Rail line together connecting from Kai Tak station to Hung Hom station. It uses the TML C trains (17 trains) and the SP1900/SP1950 (45 trains). The trains have 8 cars in 1 unit. The West Rail line used to have a mix of 7 car and 8 car trains; while the Ma On Shan line had a mix of 4 car trains and 8 car trains.

An extension of the East Rail line, phase two of the Sha Tin to Central Link (SCL) from Hung Hom station to Admiralty station across Victoria Harbour was completed and opened on 15 May 2022. An intermediate station was opened at Exhibition Centre. Along with the extension, the trains were shortened to 9 car trains from 12 cars and replaced the MLR trains with R trains. The MLR trains were retired on its 40th birthday.

| Project | Description | Opening date |
|---|---|---|
| Tuen Ma line (Phase 1) | Extension from Kai Tak station to Hung Hom station via Exhibition Centre and Diamond Hill. | February 14, 2020 |
| Tuen Ma line (Full Line) | Merging of West Rail line and Ma On Shan line via the Shatin to Central Link tunnels. | June 27, 2021 |
| East Rail line Cross-Harbour Extension | Extension of East Rail line across Victoria Harbour from Hung Hom to Admiralty via Exhibition Centre. | May 15, 2022 |

== Future extensions ==
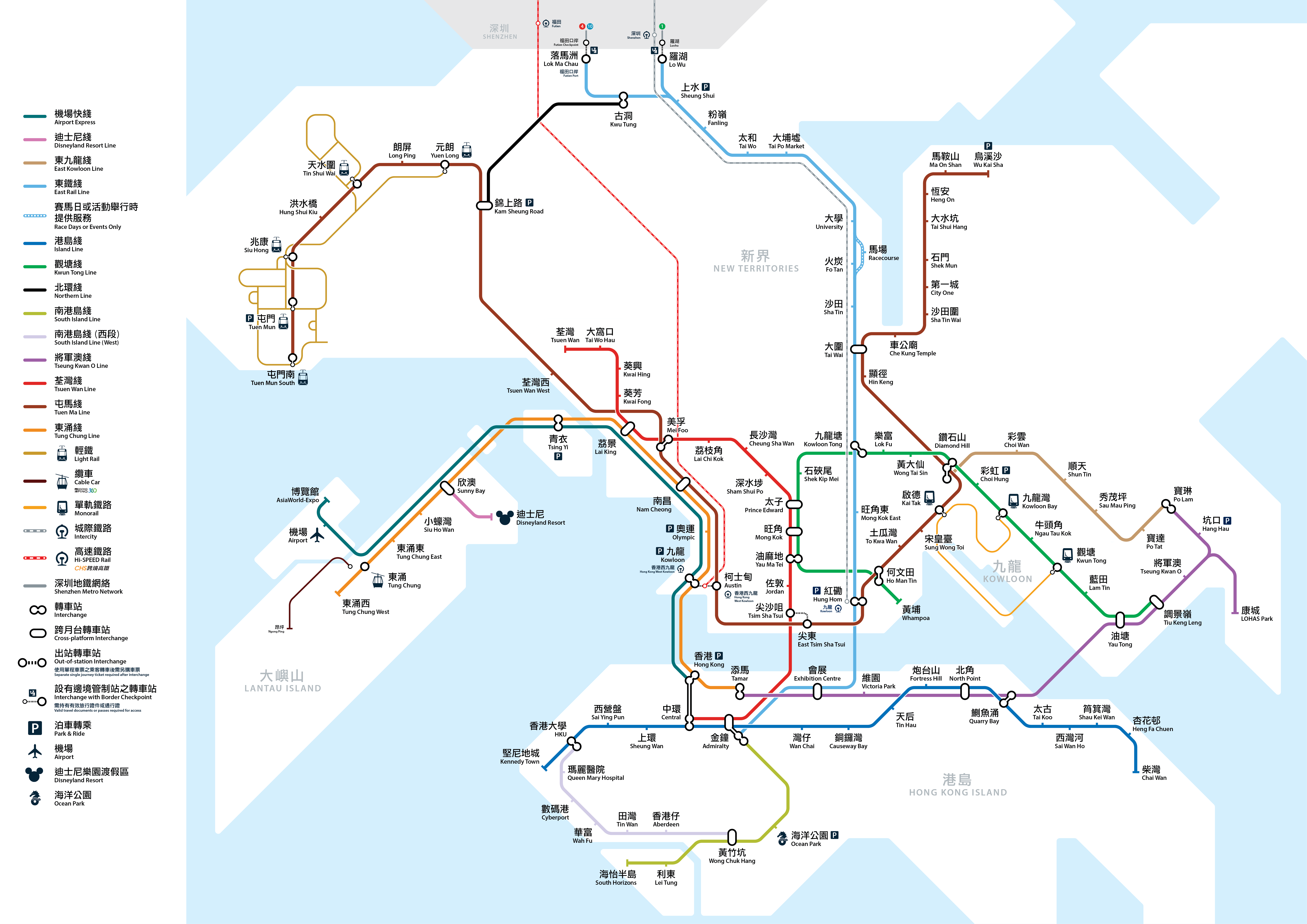
Proposed future network of the Hong Kong MTR in the Railway Development Strategy 2014

Future projects of the MTR encompass several planned line extensions, infill stations, and new transit corridors currently being undertaken by the MTR Corporation (MTRCL) and the Government of Hong Kong.

Following the completion of major projects from the Railway Development Strategy 2000—including the full opening of the Tuen Ma line (2021) and the East Rail line Cross-Harbour Extension to Admiralty (2022)—current developments are largely aligned with the Railway Development Strategy 2014 and the Hong Kong Government's Northern Metropolis development strategy and Major Transport Infrastructure Development Blueprint.

=== Projects under construction ===
==== Tuen Mun South extension ====
The Tuen Mun South extension on the Tuen Ma line is a proposed 2.4-kilometre (1.5 mi) extension southwards via an elevated viaduct from Tuen Mun station to a new western coastal terminus, Tuen Mun South, near Tuen Mun Ferry Pier. It will include the construction of an intermediate elevated station, provisionally designated the A16 station, in Tuen Mun Area 16, as well as the new terminus. Construction began in late 2023 with an estimated completion date of 2030.

Additionally, the addition of a new infill station, Hung Shui Kiu station, along the Tuen Ma line between Siu Hong station and Tin Shui Wai station is currently under planning. It may be built depending on the development of the Hung Shui Kiu New Town.

==== Northern Link (Main Line and Spur Line) ====
The Northern Link (NOL) is a proposed new major cross-district railway designed to form the primary East-West transit backbone of the Northern Metropolis, which would help to connect planned population centres isolated in the New Territories with Kowloon and Hong Kong.

- Main Line: A 10.7 km (6.6 mi) underground railway connecting Kam Sheung Road station on the Tuen Ma line to Kwu Tung station on the Lok Ma Chau Spur Line of the East Rail line, with intermediate stations at Au Tau, Ngau Tam Mei, and San Tin. Construction commenced in 2025 with targeted completion by 2034.
- Spur Line: A branch extending from San Tin through the San Tin Technopole and the Lok Ma Chau Loop to connect directly with Shenzhen's Huanggang Port checkpoint. The statutory railway scheme was gazetted in June 2026.

Construction of Kwu Tung station began on 29 September 2023, and is expected to be completed in 2027, while construction of the Northern Link is expected to begin in 2025 and is scheduled to commence service in 2034.

==== Tung Chung line extension ====
The Tung Chung line extension project comprises three new stations on Lantau Island:

- Tung Chung West station: A 1.3 km (0.81 mi) underground extension from the current Tung Chung station terminus to serve new housing estates in Tung Chung West.
- Tung Chung East station: An infill above-ground station constructed on reclaimed land between Sunny Bay station and Tung Chung station.
- Oyster Bay station: Formerly Siu Ho Wan station, an infill station situated between Sunny Bay and Tung Chung East stations. It will support the mixed-use development atop the Siu Ho Wan depot, being built next to it.

Main construction began in May 2023. Tunnelling works for the Tung Chung West section were completed in mid-2026, with revenue service targeted for 2029. Construction for Tung Chung West and Tung Chung East is expected to be completed in 2029. Construction for Oyster Bay commenced in late 2023, with phase one commissioning targeted for 2030.

==== Kwu Tung station (East Rail line) ====
Kwu Tung station is an underground infill station on the East Rail line located between Lok Ma Chau station and Sheung Shui station. Serving as the transportation hub for the Kwu Tung North New Development Area, it will also act as the future eastern terminus for the Northern Link. Construction officially commenced in September 2023, and the station structure topped out in late 2025. It is scheduled to open in 2027.

==== Hung Shui Kiu station ====
Hung Shui Kiu station is an infill station on the Tuen Ma line situated between Siu Hong station and Tin Shui Wai station. It is designed to serve the Hung Shui Kiu/Ha Tsuen New Development Area. The project was authorized by the Executive Council in March 2024, with construction targeting completion in 2030.

==== Airport Railway Extended Overrun Tunnel (AREOT) ====
The Airport Railway Extended Overrun Tunnel consists of approximately 500 metres of underground overrun tracks constructed east of Hong Kong station. The extension will allow trains on the Tung Chung line and Airport Express to change directions more efficiently, enabling higher peak-hour frequencies. Construction commenced in 2025 with completion targeted for 2032.

=== Planned and proposed projects ===
==== East Kowloon line (Smart Green Mass Transit System) ====
The East Kowloon line was originally proposed in Railway Development Strategy 2014 as a heavy underground metro line starting from Diamond Hill station until Po Lam station through the underserved Sau Mau Ping area. As of 2023, due to steep gradients and technical constraints, the proposal has been re-scoped into an elevated trackless system (either bus rapid transit or light rail) connecting Choi Hung East to Yau Tong East via Sau Mau Ping and Po Tat. It was subsequently renamed to "East Kowloon Smart Green Mass Transit System".

==== South Island line (West) ====
The South Island line (West) was part of the same original proposal as the South Island line, and would connect HKU to Wong Chuk Hang along the western coast of Hong Kong Island, serving Pok Fu Lam, Cyberport, and Wah Fu Estate. Due to topographical challenges, the government invited feasibility studies in 2023–2024 to evaluate light rail and green mass transit alternatives in place of heavy rail. Construction has not started as of 2024.

==== Hong Kong–Shenzhen Western Rail Link ====
Jointly planned by the Hong Kong and Shenzhen municipal governments, the Hong Kong–Shenzhen Western Rail Link is a proposed cross-boundary railway connecting Hung Shui Kiu in Hong Kong directly to Qianhai in Shenzhen. It is intended to integrate transport across the Guangdong-Hong Kong-Macao Greater Bay Area.

==== Deferred projects ====
- North Island line: Proposed in RDS 2014 to connect the Tung Chung line and Tseung Kwan O line across northern Hong Kong Island via new stations at Tamar and Causeway Bay North. Exhibition Centre would add new platforms and serve as an interchange between the North Island line and the East Rail line. In the original proposal, construction was expected to begin in 2026 and commence service by 2040. The cost was estimated to be HK$20 billion in 2013 prices. In 2023, the government announced that construction had been deferred indefinitely as existing cross-harbour rail capacity remained sufficient.

== Infrastructure ==
Current map

System map of the MTR effective from 14 February 2020.

=== Rail network ===
| Name and colour | Commencement | Last extension | Next extension | Termini | | Length (km) | Stations | Running time | Depot(s) | Gauge | Electrification (Note: All MTR railways use overhead lines for electrification.) | Control Centre |
|---|---|---|---|---|---|---|---|---|---|---|---|---|
| East Rail Line | 1 October 1910 (electrification: 1982–1983) | 15 May 2022 (Note: Exhibition Centre station) | 2027 | Admiralty | Lo Wu | 47.5 | 16 | 45 | Ho Tung Lau | 1,435 mm (4 ft 8 1/2 in) | 25 kV 50 Hz AC | Tsing Yi |
| East Rail Line | 1 October 1910 (electrification: 1982–1983) | 15 May 2022 | 2027 | Admiralty | Lok Ma Chau | 47.5 | 16 | 50 | Ho Tung Lau | 1,435 mm (4 ft 8 1/2 in) | 25 kV 50 Hz AC | Tsing Yi |
| Tung Chung Line | 21 June 1998 | 1 June 2005 (Note: Sunny Bay station) | 2029 | Hong Kong | Tung Chung | 31.1 | 8 | 29 | Siu Ho Wan | 1,432 mm (4 ft 8 3/8 in) | 1,500 V DC | Tsing Yi |
| Tuen Ma Line | 20 December 2003 (Note: Tuen Ma line is composed of 2 former KCR lines, namely West Rail (opened first in 2003) and Ma On Shan Rail, joined by a newly built section after the MTR-KCR network merger.) | 27 June 2021 (Note: To Kwa Wan and Sung Wong Toi stations) | 2030 | Tuen Mun | Wu Kai Sha | 56.2 | 27 | 73 | Tai Wai | 1,435 mm (4 ft 8 1/2 in) | 25 kV 50 Hz AC | Tsing Yi |
| Tuen Ma Line | 20 December 2003 | 27 June 2021 | 2030 | Tuen Mun | Wu Kai Sha | 56.2 | 27 | 73 | Pat Heung | 1,435 mm (4 ft 8 1/2 in) | 25 kV 50 Hz AC | Tsing Yi |
| Airport Express | 6 July 1998 | 20 December 2005 (Note: AsiaWorld–Expo station) | —N/a | Hong Kong | AsiaWorld–Expo | 35.3 | 5 | 28 | Siu Ho Wan | 1,432 mm (4 ft 8 3/8 in) | 1,500 V DC | Tsing Yi |
| Disneyland Resort Line | 1 August 2005 | —N/a | —N/a | Sunny Bay | Disneyland Resort | 3.3 | 2 | 5 | Siu Ho Wan | 1,432 mm (4 ft 8 3/8 in) | 1,500 V DC | Sunny Bay |
| Disneyland Resort Line | 1 August 2005 | —N/a | —N/a | Sunny Bay | Disneyland Resort | 3.3 | 2 | 5 | Siu Ho Wan | 1,432 mm (4 ft 8 3/8 in) | 1,500 V DC | Tsing Yi |
| Kwun Tong Line | 1 October 1979 | 23 October 2016 (Note: Ho Man Tin and Whampoa stations) | —N/a | Whampoa | Tiu Keng Leng | 17.4 | 17 | 35 | Kowloon Bay | 1,432 mm (4 ft 8 3/8 in) | 1,500 V DC | Tsing Yi |
| Tsuen Wan Line | 10 May 1982 | —N/a | —N/a | Central | Tsuen Wan | 16.0 | 16 | 32 | Tsuen Wan | 1,432 mm (4 ft 8 3/8 in) | 1,500 V DC | Tsing Yi |
| Island Line | 31 May 1985 | 29 March 2015 (Note: Sai Ying Pun Station) | —N/a | Kennedy Town | Chai Wan | 16.3 | 17 | 34 | Chai Wan | 1,432 mm (4 ft 8 3/8 in) | 1,500 V DC | Tsing Yi |
| Tseung Kwan O Line | 18 August 2002 | 26 July 2009 (Note: LOHAS Park Station) | Unknown | North Point | Po Lam | 12.3 | 8 | 15 | Tseung Kwan O | 1,432 mm (4 ft 8 3/8 in) | 1,500 V DC | Tsing Yi |
| Tseung Kwan O Line | 18 August 2002 | 26 July 2009 | Unknown | North Point | LOHAS Park | 12.3 | 8 | 20 | Tseung Kwan O | 1,432 mm (4 ft 8 3/8 in) | 1,500 V DC | Tsing Yi |
| South Island Line | 28 December 2016 | —N/a | —N/a | Admiralty | South Horizons | 7.4 | 5 | 11 | Wong Chuk Hang | 1,435 mm (4 ft 8 1/2 in) | 1,500 V DC | Tsing Yi |
| Express Rail Link | 22 September 2018 | —N/a | —N/a | Hong Kong West Kowloon | Varies | 26 (Hong Kong section) | 1 (Hong Kong section) | 14 (West Kowloon – Futian) | Shek Kong | 1,435 mm (4 ft 8 1/2 in) | 25 kV 50 Hz AC | Shek Kong |
| Light Rail | 18 September 1988 | 7 December 2003 (Note: Various stops in Tin Shui Wai) | —N/a | Varies | | 36.2 | 68 | Varies | Tuen Mun | 1,435 mm (4 ft 8 1/2 in) | 750 V DC | Tuen Mun |

=== Rolling stock ===
Nine types of electric multiple unit rolling stock operate on the MTR network and four generations of light rail vehicles operate on the light rail network. All use either 1,432 mm (4 ft 8 3/8 in) rail gauge (near standard gauge) or 1,435 mm (4 ft 8 1/2 in) (standard gauge). Except for Airport Express trains, all trains are designed to cope with high patronage, for example, through seating arrangements, wider train cars, additional ventilation fans, brighter train lighting, and additional sets of extra-wide doors. These configurations allow the MTR to run at up to 101,000 passengers per hour per direction (p/h/d) on its busy suburban East Rail line and around 85,000 p/h/d on its urban metro network.

| Name | Image | Line(s) | No. of cars per train | No. of doors per side | Entered service | Notes |
|---|---|---|---|---|---|---|
| M-train | | Tsuen Wan line; Island line; Tseung Kwan O line; Kwun Tong line (limited use only) | 8 | 5 | 1979 | Refurbished in the years 1998-2001. Currently undergoing phased retirement. |
| M-train | | Disneyland Resort line | 4 | 3 | 2005 | To be retired in 2028. |
| CAF-train | | Tung Chung line | 8 | 5 | 1998 | |
| CAF-train | | Airport Express | 8 | 2 | 1998 | One of the carriages only carries luggage, which has 5 doors per side and no windows. |
| K-train | | Tseung Kwan O line (from 2010) | 8 | 5 | 2002 | First operated on the Kwun Tong line |
| K-train | | Tung Chung line | 8 | 5 | 2006 | |
| C-train | | Kwun Tong line | 8 | 5 | 2011 | |
| Q-train | | Kwun Tong line; Island line; Tsuen Wan line; Tseung Kwan O line (future) | 8 | 5 | 2022 | The replacement for M-trains |
| S–train | | South Island line | 3 | 5 | 2016 | Driverless configuration; in 3-car formation instead of 8-cars. |
| R-train | | East Rail line | 9 | 5 (or 2 on First Class) | 2021 | First train delivered in 2015. Replaced the SP1900s and MLRs that used to operate on the East Rail line. Only one set of doors is used on first class normally. |
| IKK train | | Tuen Ma line | 8 | 5 | 2001 | Refurbished in the years 2015-2017. Previously 4, 7 or 12 car SP1900, SP1950 and KRS991 sets on the Ma On Shan line, West Rail line and East Rail line. Reconfigured into 8 car sets for Tuen Ma line. |
| TML C-train | | Tuen Ma line | 8 | 5 | 2017 | |
| Phase I LRV | | Light Rail (All services) | 1–2 | 3 | 1988 | Doors on the left side only |
| Phase III LRV | | Light Rail (All services) | 1–2 | 3 | 1997 | Doors on the left side only |
| Phase IV LRV | | Light Rail (All services) | 1–2 | 3 | 2009 | Doors on the left side only |
| Phase V LRV | | Light Rail (All services) | 1–2 | 3 | 2020 | Doors on the left side only |
| Vibrant Express | | MTR High-speed rail service (along the Guangzhou–Shenzhen–Hong Kong Express Rail Link) | 8 | 2 | 2018 | 6 Standard Class motor cars (2 with pantographs), 2 First-class trailer cars |

==== Former rolling stock ====
| Name | Image | Line(s) | No. of cars per train | No. of doors per side | Entered service | Year retired | Notes |
|---|---|---|---|---|---|---|---|
| MLR Train | | East Rail line | 12 | 5 | 1982 | 2022 | It was replaced by the MTR Hyundai Rotem EMU (R-Train) in the years 2021–2022. |
| Phase II LRV | | Light Rail (All services) | 1–2 | 3 | 1992 | 2023 | Not refurbished, it was replaced by CRRC Nanjing Puzhen's Phase V LRVs in the years 2022–2023. |
| KTT | | MTR intercity services (along the East Rail line) | 12 | 2 (coaches) | 1998 | 2020 | 10 coaches between 2 locomotives normally. Retired due to discontinuation of long-distance train services. |

==== Metro Cammell EMU (DC) ====
Known as M-trains, these are the oldest model of train in operation. M-Trains can be divided into different "stocks". The M-stock (or "CM-stock") of M-Train are the oldest trains on the MTR, built originally by Metro-Cammell (now Alstom) and refurbished by United Goninan. The M-train uses sliding doors, unlike K-stocks and Grupo CAF Trains which use plug doors. They are in service on Kwun Tong line, Tsuen Wan line, Island line and Tseung Kwan O line.

The Disneyland Resort line uses driverless M-trains with their appearance overhauled to suit the atmosphere and theme of the line. Windows on each carriage and the handrails inside are made into the shape of Mickey Mouse's head, and there are bronze-made Disney characters decorating the interior of the carriages.

All 93 sets of the M-trains will be retired from service by 2030, and be replaced by the Q-Trains.

==== Adtranz-CAF EMU ====
The Tung Chung line and the Airport Express use CAF Trains tailored to their respective lines. Initially run in seven-car formations, they have now been lengthened to eight cars. These two variations are built jointly by Adtranz (now Bombardier Transportation) and Grupo CAF (CAF) between 1994 and 1997. Since 2006, K-stock has also been used on the Tung Chung line.

==== Rotem EMU (K-trains) ====
The K-stock was built jointly by Mitsubishi Heavy Industries and Hyundai Rotem and first put into service on the Kwun Tong line. These were eventually transferred to the Tseung Kwan O line in 2009. Subsequently, in 2006, four additional sets joined the Tung Chung line to cope with the increasing passenger traffic. K-Stock trains have come under criticism when they were first put into service due to delays and door safety issues. Along with other service reliability issues, there have been incidents where passengers have been injured by its doors, leading to the MTRCL "minimising the number of Korean trains for passenger service until a higher reliability of the systems concerned is achieved".

==== CNR Changchun EMU (C-trains) ====
A contract (C6554-07E) for 10 new sets of trains was awarded to Changchun Railway Vehicles Co. Limited in October 2008 with a further 12 trains ordered in the summer of 2011. These were delivered to Hong Kong between 2011 and 2013 to enhance train frequency on the existing lines to cater for increased patronage on the Island, Kwun Tong, Tsuen Wan and Tseung Kwan O lines. These trains feature new 22" LCD TVs, like their counterparts on former KCR lines, and as a result are equipped with MTR In-Train TV, offering infotainment such as news and announcements. The first of these trains entered revenue service on 7 December 2011 on the Kwun Tong line.

The South Island line uses a similar train known as the S-train. Unlike the original C-train, the pantographs are on the "A" cars. All cars are powered, so there are no trailer cars. The S-train is also only three cars long and are driverless, with the driver's cab removed to make standing space for passengers. However, the S-trains can still be operated manually in the event of an emergency.

==== SP1900/1950 EMU (IKK-trains) ====
The Tuen Ma line uses the SP1900, also known as the IKK (Itochu-Kinki-Kawasaki) train. The electrification system used on Tuen Ma line is 25 kV 50 Hz AC, as opposed to the 1,500 V DC used on the urban lines. Should the need arise in the future, dual voltage trains such as those used on Oresund Bridge would be required.

The rolling stock is from the former KCRC network (KCR East Rail, West Rail and Ma On Shan Rail). They did not receive major changes after the merger of the two companies except for the updated route map, the exterior company logo and such. The capability of this EMU fleet is similar to those on the urban network. Starting from 2015, the West Rail and Ma On Shan line trains have been lengthened to 8 cars while the East Rail line 12 car sets have been withdrawn from the line in 2021. All train sets will receive larger TV displays and dynamic route map displays above every door, and will run on the Tuen Ma line in the future.

==== Hyundai Rotem EMU (R-stock) ====
In December 2012, the MTRC announced that new contracts had been awarded to Hyundai Rotem for 37 new nine-car trains to be used on the Sha Tin to Central Link. These trains are expected to replace the Metro Cammell EMUs that currently run on the East Rail line. The new R-stock trains are wider than existing units and can accommodate more passengers per car; however, the length of each train will be shortened from the current 12-car configuration used on the Metro Cammell and SP1900 EMUs to nine cars. This is due to space constraints imposed by new underground platforms on the Sha Tin to Central Link. MTR will also upgrade existing signalling systems used on the East Rail line which will enable trains to operate at two-minute headways on average, instead of the current three-minute interval, which the MTRC expects will be able to compensate for the loss of capacity resulting from the shorter trains. However, there are concerns from local residents that this will not be effective.

==== Light rail vehicles ====
Light rail rolling stock were ordered from four different manufacturers: Commonwealth Engineering (Comeng), Kawasaki Heavy Industries, UGL and CRRC Nanjing Puzhen. They are designed to run on the standard gauge and use 750 V DC delivered through overhead lines. Trains comprise one or two carriages, where the second carriage functions as only a trailer. The arrangement allows each car to carry approximately 300 passengers with 26 seats, while four sets of poach seats provide flexible riding for passengers.

The light rail trains are being modernised as part of a 20th anniversary activity. Trains will include better disabled facilities as well as a totally new interior. The MTR will refurbish 69 older trains (revised to 68 as one was scrapped following a traffic incident) and buy 22 new ones. The first trains have been completed and were scheduled to be put into service in November 2009. The whole project is expected to be completed in 2011.

Another batch of 40 Phase V trains have been ordered from CRRC Nanjing Puzhen, which will replace 30 Kawasaki Phase II trains which will not be refurbished, and the 10 additional trains will be used for enhancing services. The first pair of trains (leading + trailer car) entered service in 2020.

==== Maintenance trains ====
In addition to the passenger electric multiple units as covered above, MTR also uses various types of work trains for maintenance purposes:

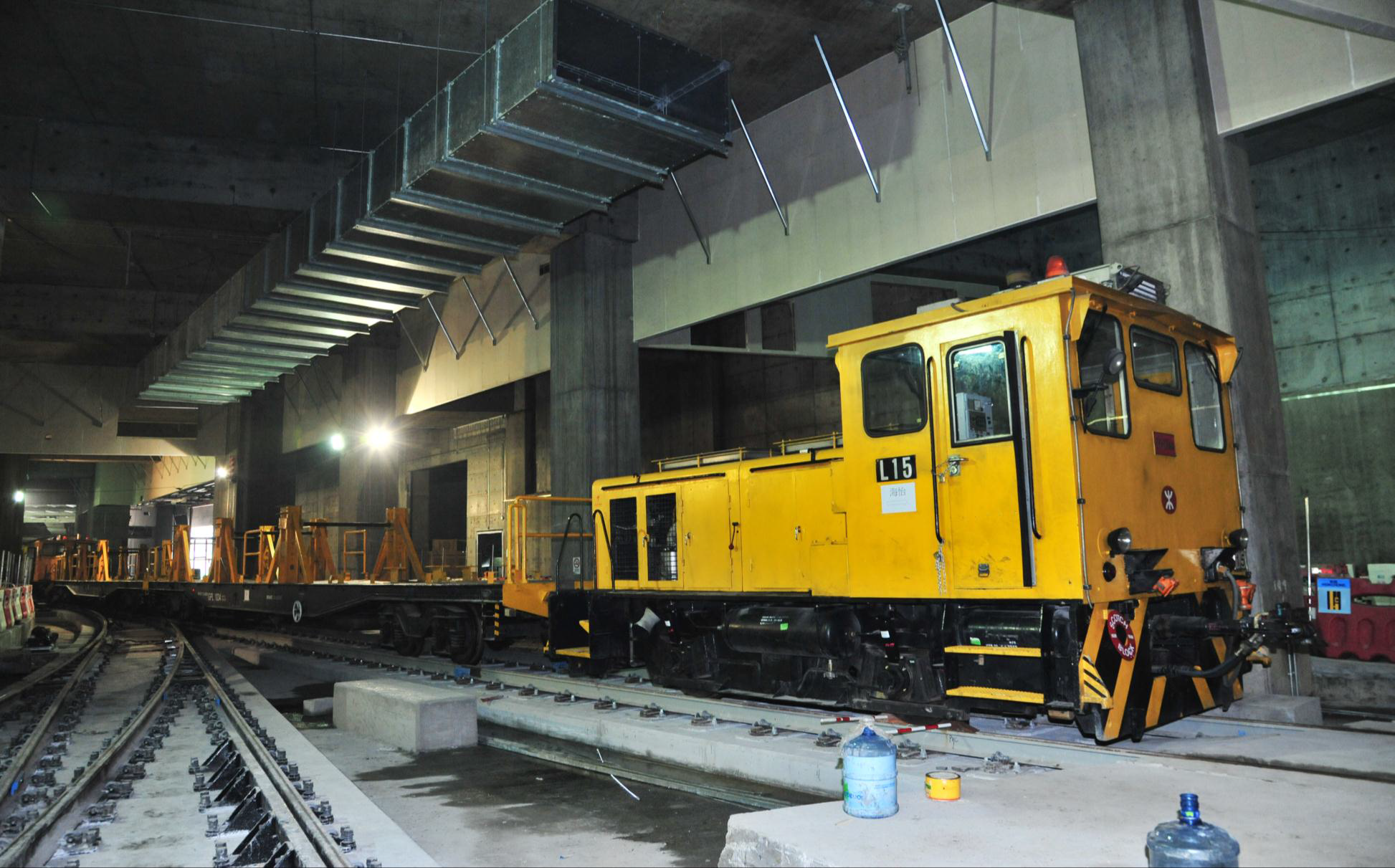
Schöma diesel locomotives as used by MTR for work trains

- On the urban lines and Lantau Airport Railway, several different battery-electric locomotives and diesel locomotives are used to haul various work trains (including ultrasonic test vehicles and specialist wagons used for overhead wiring access, cable laying, rail transport, tunnel repair etc.), with the former being built by Brush Traction and the latter by Schöma. Like the passenger trains, they are also equipped with BSI couplers, albeit without the electrical connections. The locomotives were delivered in different phases:
  - The battery electrics were delivered in three different phases. The first phase comprises five units numbered L51 to L55 which entered service in 1983 and are capable of hauling a maximum trailing load of 109 tonnes on a 3% of gradient. The second phase has six units numbered L56 to L61 which entered service in 1989. They have the same performance as the phase 1 units and can be assumed to be of the same general design. The pantograph is located atop the cab roof, with no sign of an air conditioner. The third phase comprises twenty units numbered L62 to L82 which entered service in 1996; most are used on the Lantau Airport Railway, but some on the urban lines. They are more powerful than the earlier units, being able to haul 160 tonnes. Their design is also slightly different to phase 2 units, with the pantograph at the opposite end, and an air conditioner above the cab.
  - The Schöma diesel fleet came before the battery electrics. Capable of hauling 100 tonnes, they are presumed to have assisted in the construction of the network and came in three different phases: phase 1 (nine units numbered L11 to L19) in 1977, phase 2 (nine units numbered L20 to 28) in 1979 and phase 3 (eight units numbered L31 to L38) in 1983. They are presumed to be capable of multiple unit operation.
- On the ex-KCR lines, diesel locomotives such as the Eurorunner that were formerly used for freight services are now used on works trains and transferring EMUs trains between depots. Maintenance trains for the East Rail line are also largely stabled at Fo Tan depot.
- In 2015, MTR procured two new SF02T-FS rail milling machines from Linsinger. Instead of rail grinding, these machines mill the rail head, providing a more accurate profile and a higher quality processed surface. However, the machines are not without flaws and one of them caught fire on the Tsuen Kwan O Line on 9 May 2016 during maintenance hours.

=== Station facilities, amenities and services ===
Bilingual real-time information is provided on every platform, shown above is the PIDS for East Rail line

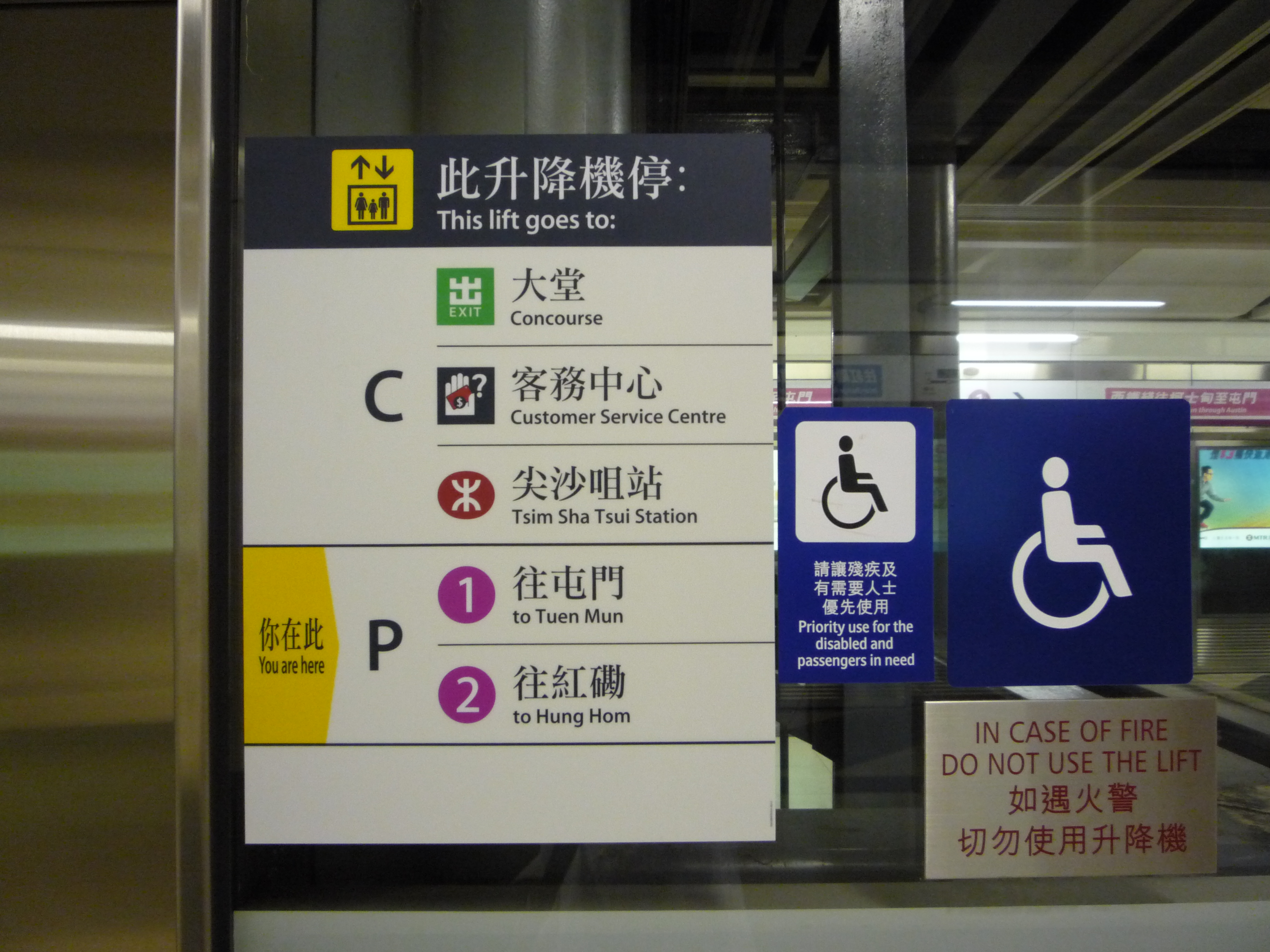
Most heavy-rail stations have lifts connecting the platform and the concourse

With the high level of daily passenger traffic, facilities of the MTR stations are built with durability and accessibility in mind. After extensive retrofitting, the MTR system has become, in general, disabled-friendly—the trains have dedicated wheelchair space, the stations have special floor tiles to guide the blind safely on the platforms, and there are extra wide entry and exit gates for wheelchairs as well. Portable ramp for wheelchair users are available for boarding and alighting trains. On board the rolling stock, there are also flashing system maps on select trains while Active Line Diagrams and traditional route maps are installed on the others. Infopanels as well as on MTR In-Train TV onboard trains display important messages such as next station announcements as well as operational messages.

==== Telecommunications ====
LTE (4G) and 5G mobile phone network is in place throughout the whole MTR system of stations and tunnels allowing passengers to stay connected to the internet underground. Currently, there is full 5G network coverage in all stations and tunnels (except certain underground sections on the East Rail line and Tuen Ma line) for the MTR system has been provided by 3 Hong Kong, SmarTone and PCCW. Passengers are able to use high-speed internet on their mobile phones regardless whether the train is above ground or under ground. The MTR has already extended the Wi-Fi service to all of the Airport Express trains and the expansion of the service to other MTR routes is still under consideration by MTR. All 99 stations on the MTR offer free Wi-Fi service with a limit of 15 minutes per session and a maximum of five sessions per day.

In late 2015 it was announced that all 400 payphones in the MTR system would be removed in early 2016. The contract with the service provider, Shinetown Telecom, was expiring, and the MTR Corporation said that no one had tendered a proposal to take over the contract. As a result, the MTR system no longer has payphones.

==== Announcements ====
When the system opened, public announcements were made in British English and Cantonese by train captains and station staff. In 1992, the announcements were standardised, pre-recorded by RTHK presenter Cheri Chan Yu-yan (Chinese: 陳如茵), who is now an assistant professor of English-language education at the University of Hong Kong, and who remains the voice of the MTR today. Since 2004, to accommodate Mainland Chinese visitors under the Individual Visit Scheme, Mandarin Chinese was added to the repertory.

==== Public toilets ====
Unlike many other metro systems around the world, "main line" MTR stations originally did not have toilet facilities available for public use. Passengers may use MTR staff toilets at all stations on request. In 2006, MTRCL said it would not consider retrofitting existing underground toilets, because of the challenge of installing new piping and toilet facilities. Only stations on the Airport Express, Tung Chung line and Disneyland Resort line had access to toilet facilities. All former KCR stations (on the East Rail line and Tuen Ma line), merged into the MTR network in 2007, have public toilets.

During the Legislative Council rail merger bill discussions, the MTR Corporation was criticised by legislators for their unwillingness to install toilets in main line stations. MTRCL indicated that it would carry out a review of the feasibility of installing public toilets at or in the vicinity of its above-ground railway stations. Discussions between the Government and MTRCL have taken into account LegCo members' request for a stronger commitment by the corporation to the provision of public toilets on new railway lines. This resulted in MTRCL agreeing to include the provision of toilets within, or adjacent to, stations in the overall design parameters for all future new railway lines, subject to planning and regulatory approval and any concerns raised by residents in the vicinity about the location of external ventilation exhausts.

Toilets have since been retrofitted into several existing MTR stations, including Sheung Wan station, Ngau Tau Kok station, Quarry Bay station, Mong Kok station, Prince Edward station, and Admiralty station. In addition, newly opened stations such as those of the West Island line have toilets. The MTR has installed public toilets at all interchanges as of 2023.

In late 2017, the MTR introduced breastfeeding rooms at 20 interchange stations. The rooms are located in back of house areas, and are available upon request to MTR staff.

==== Commerce and journals ====
Prior to the privatisation of MTRC, MTR stations only had branches of the Hang Seng Bank, Maxim's Cakes stores, and a handful of other shops. Since then, the number and types of shops have increased at stations has increased, turning some of them into miniature shopping centres. ATMs and convenience stores are now commonplace.

The MTR has contracted with publishers for the distribution of free magazines and newspapers in MTR stations. Recruit was the first free magazine which was solely distributed in stations (before railway merger) since July 1992, but the contract was terminated in July 2002. Another recruitment magazine Jiu Jik (招職), published by South China Morning Post, replaced Recruit as the only free recruitment magazine distributed in MTR stations bi-weekly. The Metropolis Daily (都市日報), published by Metro International, is the first free newspaper distributed free in MTR stations during weekdays (except public holidays); and in 2005, there is another weekend newspaper Express Post (快線週報), distributed every Saturday except public holidays. The Metropop (都市流行), a weekly magazine featuring cultural affairs and city trends also published by Metro International, started its distribution in MTR stations every Thursday since 27 April 2006, a few months after the termination of Hui Kai Guide (去街 Guide) in 2006. MTR Stations on ex-KCR lines feature two free Chinese-language newspapers, namely am730 and Headline Daily. MTR promotes reading of these newspapers by adding special coupons and promotion offers inside the newspapers, for example, a free trip to Lok Ma Chau or a free keyring. On the Kwun Tong line, East Rail line and Tuen Ma line, MTR In-Train TV is available.

=== MTR Bus ===
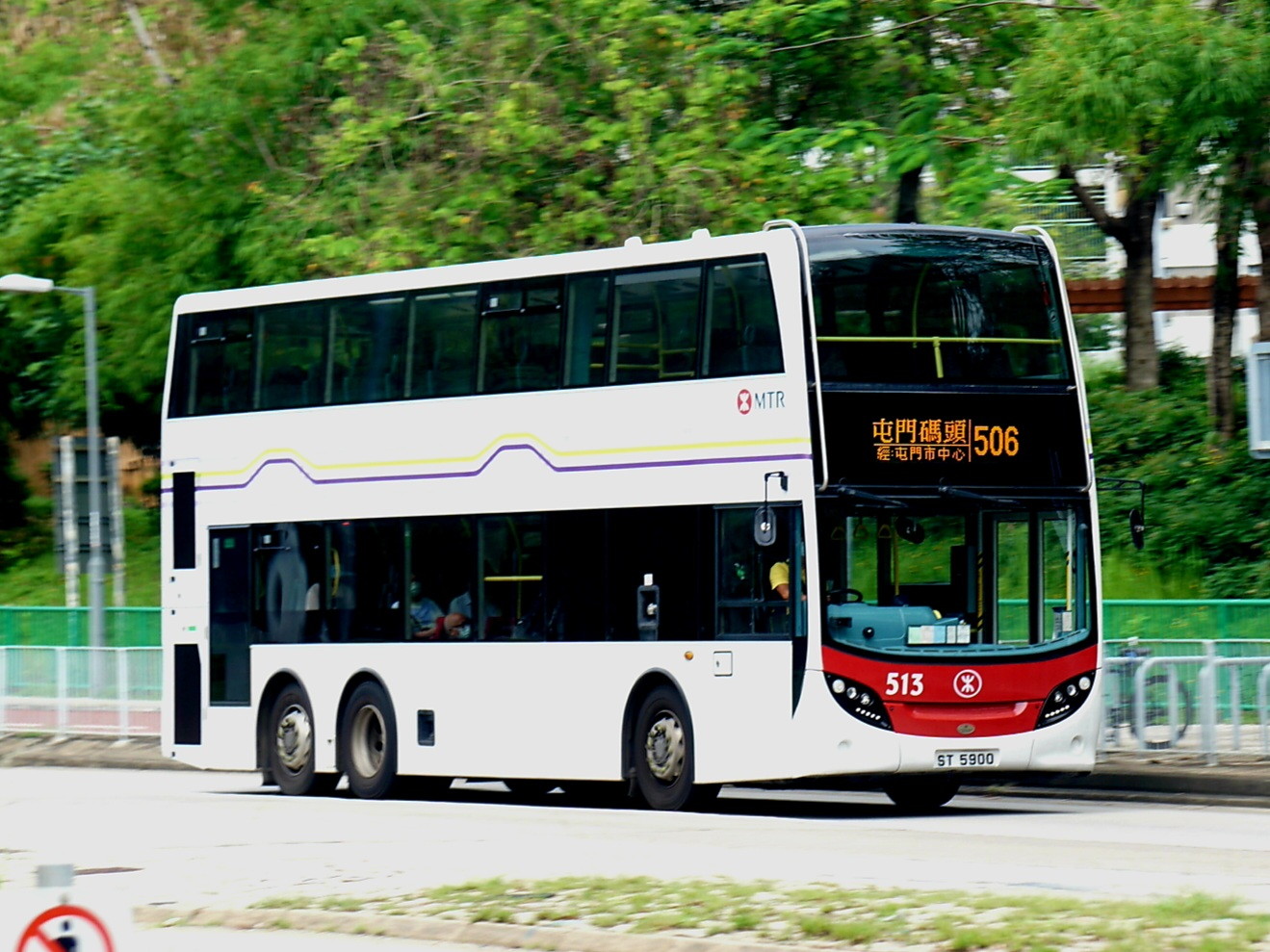
An Alexander Dennis Enviro500 MMC serving on MTR Bus route 506

At various stations of the MTR network, the MTRCL (which took over from KCR) operates feeder buses which enhance the convenience of taking the MTR. These bus routes, which normally consist of one to two stops, terminate at housing estates and go past major landmarks. The feeder bus routes on the East Rail line are run under the MTR name but are operated by Kowloon Motor Bus.

=== Signalling ===
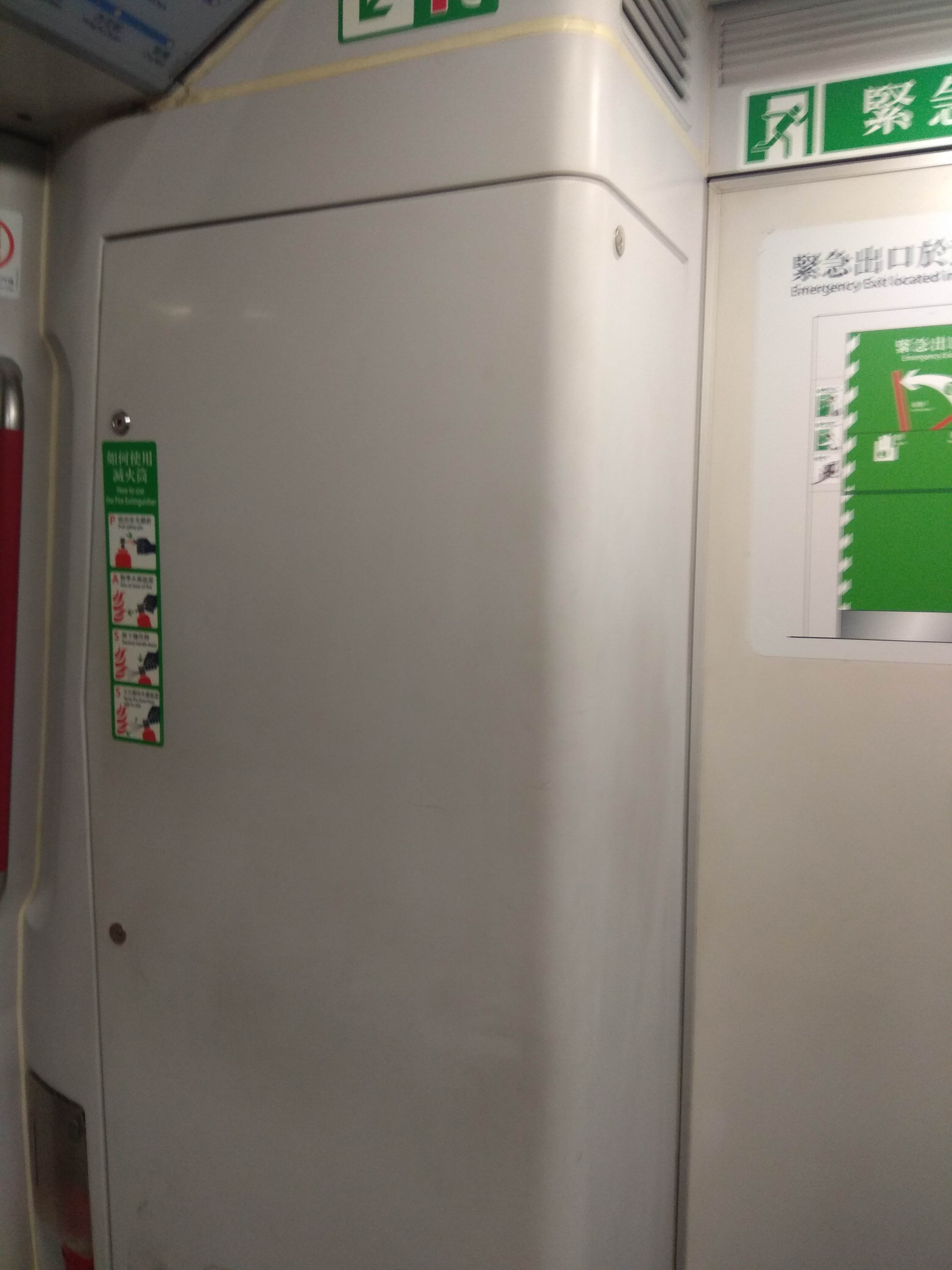
Compartment for new signalling equipment on an MTR train

Throughout its history, MTR has used different signalling systems for its lines. The main Operations Control Centre for the entire network is located at Tsing Yi. Previous control centres were located at Fo Tan and Kam Tin for the East Rail line, Ma On Shan line and West Rail line.

On the pre-merger MTR network, wayside signals are simple two-aspect signals whose colours are namely red for "stop" and blue for "proceed according to ATO"; this is made possible by the use of automatic train operation (ATO) which provides the onboard equipment the permitted speeds via undercarriage antennas located underneath the cab whereas the signals having been sent by radio transmitters located between the rails. An automatic train protection (ATP) is also used to enforce safety.

In 1998, transmission balise-locomotive (TBL) was implemented on the East Rail line to monitor train safety. Subsequently, in 2002, ATO was also implemented on the East Rail line. However, the original British-style Automatic Warning System is still retained for use by Intercity-Through Trains. On the other hand, the Tuen Ma line uses a SelTrac moving block communications-based train control (CBTC) system from Alcatel Canada (now Thales Group). The SelTrac system is also used by the fully automated Disneyland Resort line, whereas the South Island line uses another signalling supplier, Alstom, Urbalis 400 CBTC system.

As part of RailGen 2.0 implemented from 2014 onwards to improve the standards of the rail network, the signalling systems on the older lines are to be replaced with new CBTC systems; the system used for the pre-merger network will be replaced with Alstom-Thales SelTrac whereas that for the East Rail line will be replaced by Siemens Trainguard CBTC. However, the signalling upgrades encountered a serious setback in the form of a train collision outside Central station on 18 March 2019.

| Line | Supplier | Solution | Commission Date | Remarks |
|---|---|---|---|---|
| Kwun Tong line Island line | Alstom | SACEM | 1996–1998 | —N/a |
| Airport Express Tung Chung line | Alstom | SACEM | 1998 | —N/a |
| Tseung Kwan O line | Siemens | SACEM | 2002 | includes a section of Kwun Tong line between Lam Tin and Tiu Keng Leng and a service tunnel formerly connecting Lam Tin to the Eastern Harbour Tunnel. |
| Disneyland Resort line | Alstom | SelTrac LS | 2005 | Fully automated |
| East Rail line | Siemens | Trainguard MT CBTC | 2021 | AWS will be retained for Intercity-Through Trains. |
| Tuen Ma line | Alstom | SelTrac IS | 2003, 2004 | —N/a |
| South Island line | Alstom | Urbalis 400 | 2016 | Fully automated |
| Light Rail | Unknown | Also unknown | 1988 | —N/a |
| Hong Kong Express Rail Link | Hollysys | CTCS-2 and CTCS-3 | 2018 | —N/a |
| Tsuen Wan line | Alstom, Thales | Advanced SelTrac CBTC | 2026 | —N/a |
Future
| Kwun Tong line Island line Tseung Kwan O line Tung Chung line Airport Express | Alstom, Thales | Advanced SelTrac CBTC | 2027–2029 | Implementation delayed due to a train collision on the Tsuen Wan line in March 2019 |
| Disneyland Resort line | Traffic Control Technology | CBTC | 2027 | —N/a |
Former
| Kwun Tong line Tsuen Wan line Island line | Westinghouse | Block Work | 1979 | Deactivated by 1998 |
| Tsuen Wan line | Alstom | SACEM | 1996–1998 | Deactivated by 2026 |

=== Head office ===
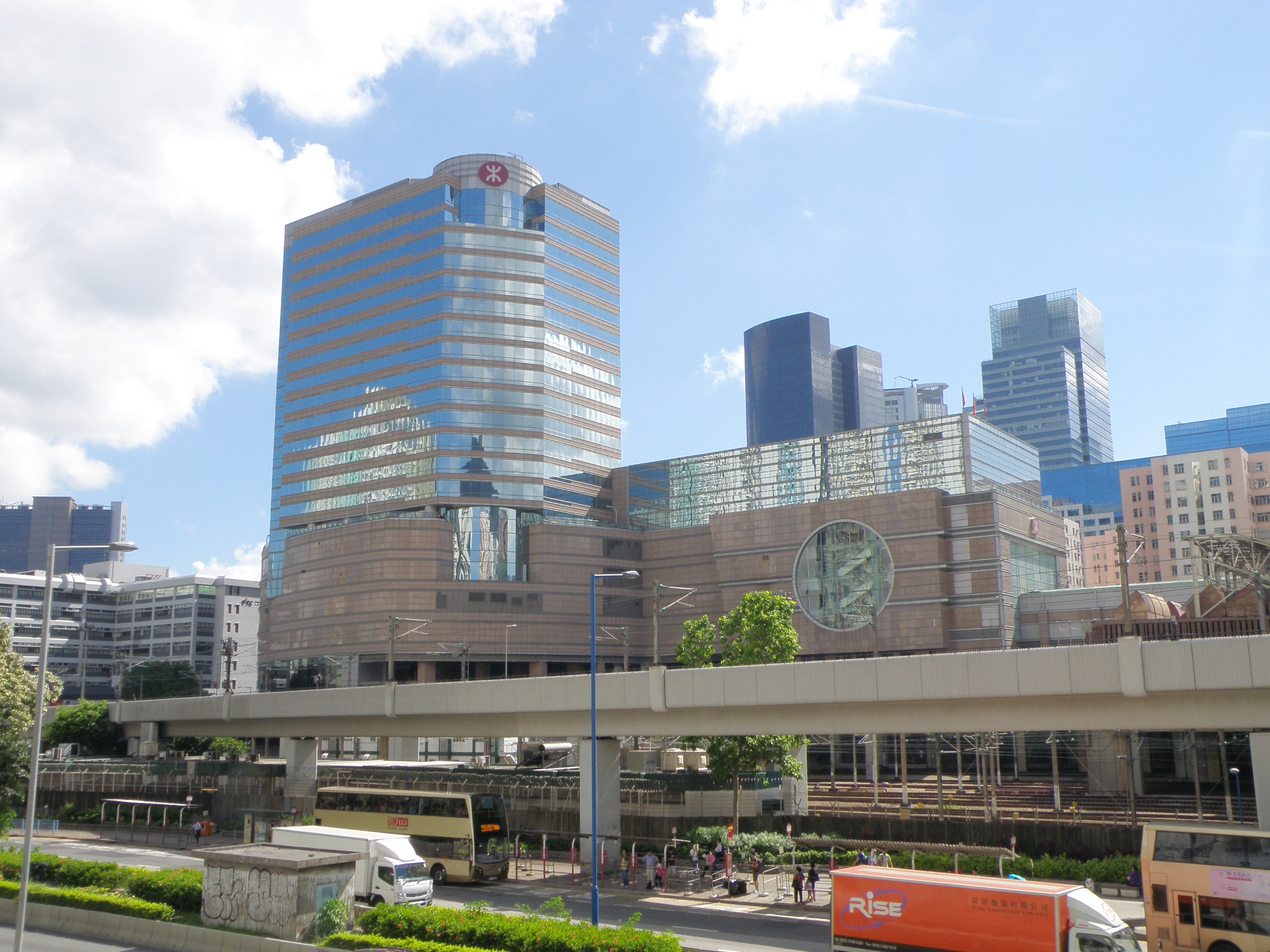
MTR Headquarters Building, Telford Gardens

The MTR Headquarters Building is located at Telford Plaza. It is a part of the larger Telford Garden complex, which was developed as part of a partnership between MTR and private development companies.

Telford Plaza held an exhibition dedicated to the history of MTR in April 2014.

== Fares and tickets ==
After the rail merger, there are three different fare classes on the MTR: Adult, Students and Concessionary. Only children below the age of 12 and senior citizens 65 years or older are eligible for the concessionary rate on all lines. Full-time Hong Kong students between the ages of 12 and 25 qualify for the concessionary rate using a personalized Octopus Card on all lines except on Airport Express, or travel to or from cross-border stations (Lo Wu/Lok Ma Chau). Children below the age of 3 travel free (unless they exceed the height range).

The fare of MTR between any two particular stations is not calculated using a particular formula, and must be looked up from the fare table. Fares for the Airport Express Line are significantly higher. Services to checkpoint termini are also more expensive than ordinary fares, as are journeys that require a harbor crossing than are journeys that do not. Adult fares range from HK$3.6 to $52.6 (US$0.46–6.74). Concessionary fares are usually half the adult fare, and range from HK$1.50 to $27.00. Student fares are the same as child and elderly fare on the urban lines, but are the same as the Adult fares for journeys to or from checkpoint termini, and range from HK$1.50 to $51.00. The fare is subject to adjustment in June every year.

Prior to May 2009, MTR did not provide concessionary fares for the disabled. Legislators such as social welfare constituency legislator Fernando Cheung Chiu-hung and those from Hong Kong's Association for Democracy and People's Livelihood had for years demanded that such concessions be put in place. In May 2009, MTR eventually agreed to offer the disabled concessionary fares with HK$2 million sponsorship from Transport and Housing Bureau and under the condition that Legislative Council amends the Disability Discrimination Ordinance.

Single journey tickets can be purchased at vending machines while tourist passes, Octopus cards and other special tickets must be purchased at the ticket counter. Credit cards are only accepted to purchase Airport Express tickets and tourist Octopus cards from automatic vending machines located within Hong Kong airport.

First Class fares are available exclusively on the East Rail line and can be purchased for an additional premium, equivalent to the standard class fare for the same journey. First class cabins have guaranteed seating and have considerably fewer passengers than standard class. Passengers can validate their First Class fare on designated First Class scanners with their Octopus card prior to entering the cabin. First Class single journey tickets may also be purchased within the stations.

There are also frequent-user passes, such as the MTR City Saver, which is valid at 67 stations and can be used for 40 trips over 40 days, and the Tuen Mun-Nam Cheong day pass, which is valid for unlimited travel for one day on a portion of the Tuen Ma line.

Starting 24 August 2024, passengers can use Visa, Mastercard credit/debit card and China UnionPay credit card to pay MTR fares. China T-Union cards were added in March 2025. This option is only available at light blue fare gates, and the Airport Express will not support these payments until 2026.

=== Octopus cards ===
The Octopus card is a reusable contactless stored value smart card for making electronic payments in online or offline systems in Hong Kong developed by Australian company ERG Group.

Launched in September 1997 to collect fares for the territory's mass transit system, the Octopus card system became the world's second contactless smart card system, after the Korean Upass, and has since grown into a widely used payment system for all public transport in Hong Kong. Octopus's success has led to the development of the Navigo card in Paris, the Oyster card in London, the Opal card in New South Wales, NETS FlashPay, EZ-Link in Singapore, and other similar systems.

The Octopus card has also evolved for use as payment in many retail shops in Hong Kong, including convenience stores, supermarkets, and fast-food restaurants. Other common Octopus payment applications include parking meters, car parks, petrol stations, vending machines, fee payment at public libraries and swimming pools, and more. The cards are also used for non-payment purposes, such as school attendance and access control for office buildings and housing estates.

=== Tourist pass ===
The Tourist Day Pass gives tourists unlimited MTR rides (with the exception of MTR Bus routes, the First Class section of the East Rail line, the Airport Express, as well as journeys to and from Lo Wu, Lok Ma Chau and Racecourse stations) for 24 hours from the point of first entry. Each pass costs HK$65 and is available at all the MTR Customer Service Centres. Tourist Day Pass must be used within 30 days upon the day of issue. The Airport Express Tourist Octopus Cards are also available. Cardholders may enjoy three days of unlimited rides on the MTR (except Airport Express, East Rail line First Class, and journeys involving Lo Wu and Lok Ma Chau stations) for a refundable deposit of HK$50 and choice of either a single (HK$220) or round trip (HK$300) on the Airport Express.

=== Other fares ===
A touchless smart card system is used for single journey tickets. These tickets are pre-paid for between pre-determined stations, and are good for only one trip. There are no return tickets, except on the Airport Express. As of mid-2013, less than five per cent of MTR customers travelled on single journey tickets.

Fares for the Airport Express are substantially different from main line fares. Apart from single tickets, same-day return tickets (same price as a single), and one-month return tickets are also available.

A one-day pass was able to be purchased for unlimited travel to and from Hong Kong Disneyland within the same day, from 2005 to 2011, and cost HK$50. This pass could be purchased from any MTR Customer Service Centres or Airport Express Customer Service Centres.

=== Ticket recommendation ===
Ticket Suggestion and Route Suggestion functions are available on the MTR website; based on trip destination and travel pattern, they can recommend the lowest price ticket type for daily and non-daily commuters.

Third parties, such as MTR Service Update, have also developed ticket recommendation capabilities, claiming to be more user-friendly and fare-saving. The Checkfare function at MTR Service Update can recommend whether to interchange at Tsim Sha Tsui or East Tsim Sha Tsui, to receive a better discount.

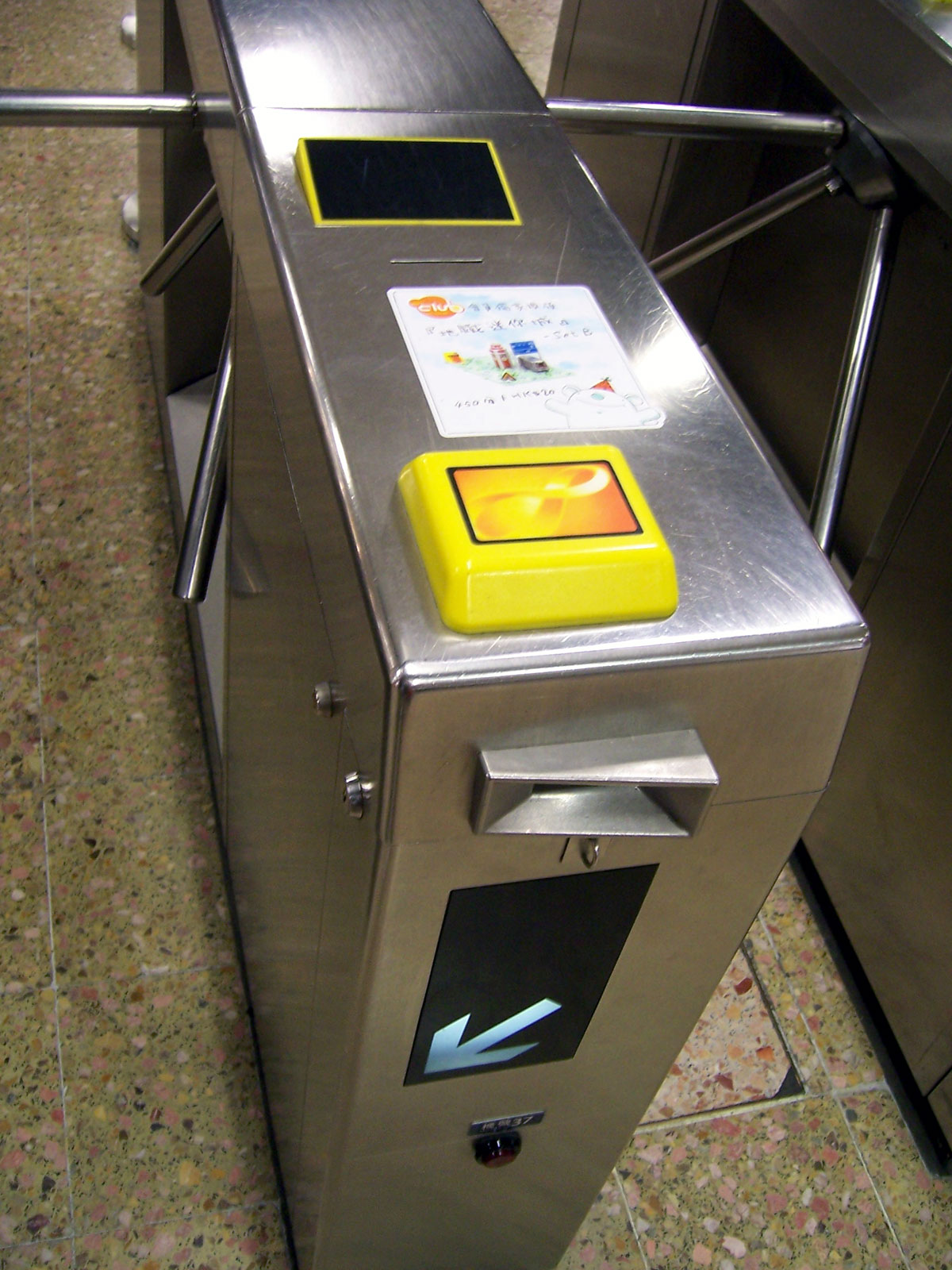
An MTR ticket gate with an Octopus reader

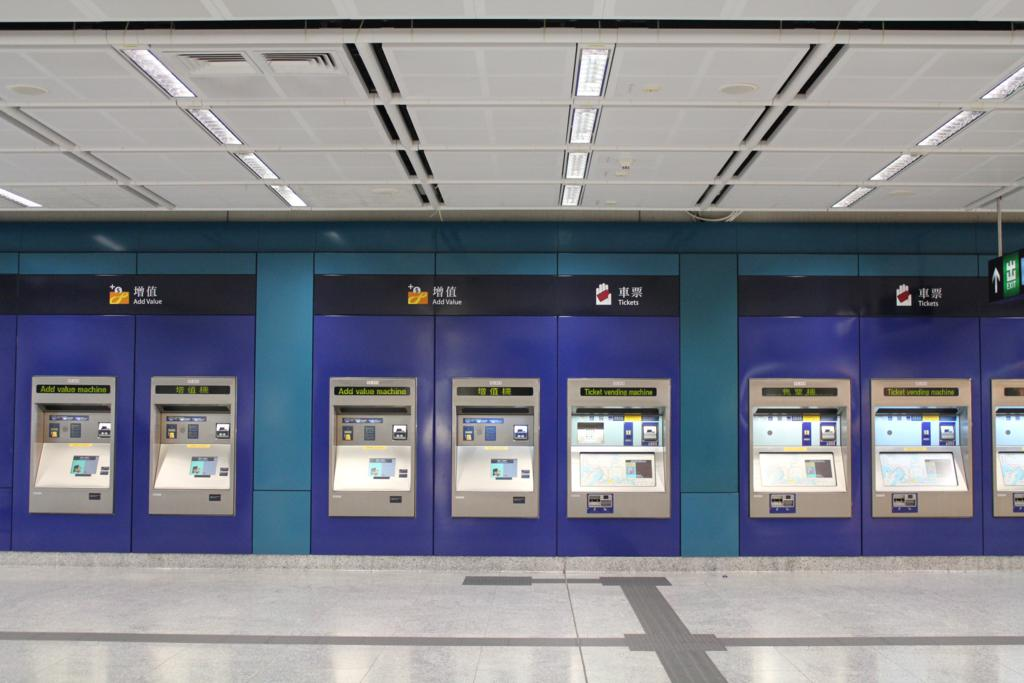
Ticket and add-value machines

== Performance ==
Rapid Transit Ridership
| Year | ridership (million) | ±% |
|---|---|---|
| 2008 | 1,309 | — |
| 2009 | 1,323 | +1.1% |
| 2010 | 1,410 | +6.6% |
| 2011 | 1,482 | +5.1% |
| 2012 | 1,553 | +4.8% |
| 2013 | 1,600 | +3.0% |
| 2014 | 1,676 | +4.8% |
| 2015 | 1,707 | +1.8% |
| 2016 | 1,716 | +0.5% |

Since the merger in 2007, MTR has consistently achieved a 99.9% on-time rate, meaning 999 of every 1,000 passengers arrives at their destination within 5 minutes of scheduled time. In 2013, out of the 5.2 million passengers the MTR averaged each workday, 5.195 million passengers were considered to have arrived "on time". This makes the MTR one of the most efficient major public transport networks on the planet. MTR must report all delays of more than eight minutes to the government. There were 143 reportable incidents in 2013. MTR is fined HK$1 million for having delays of 30 minutes to an hour, with higher fines for longer delays.

== Regulations and safety ==
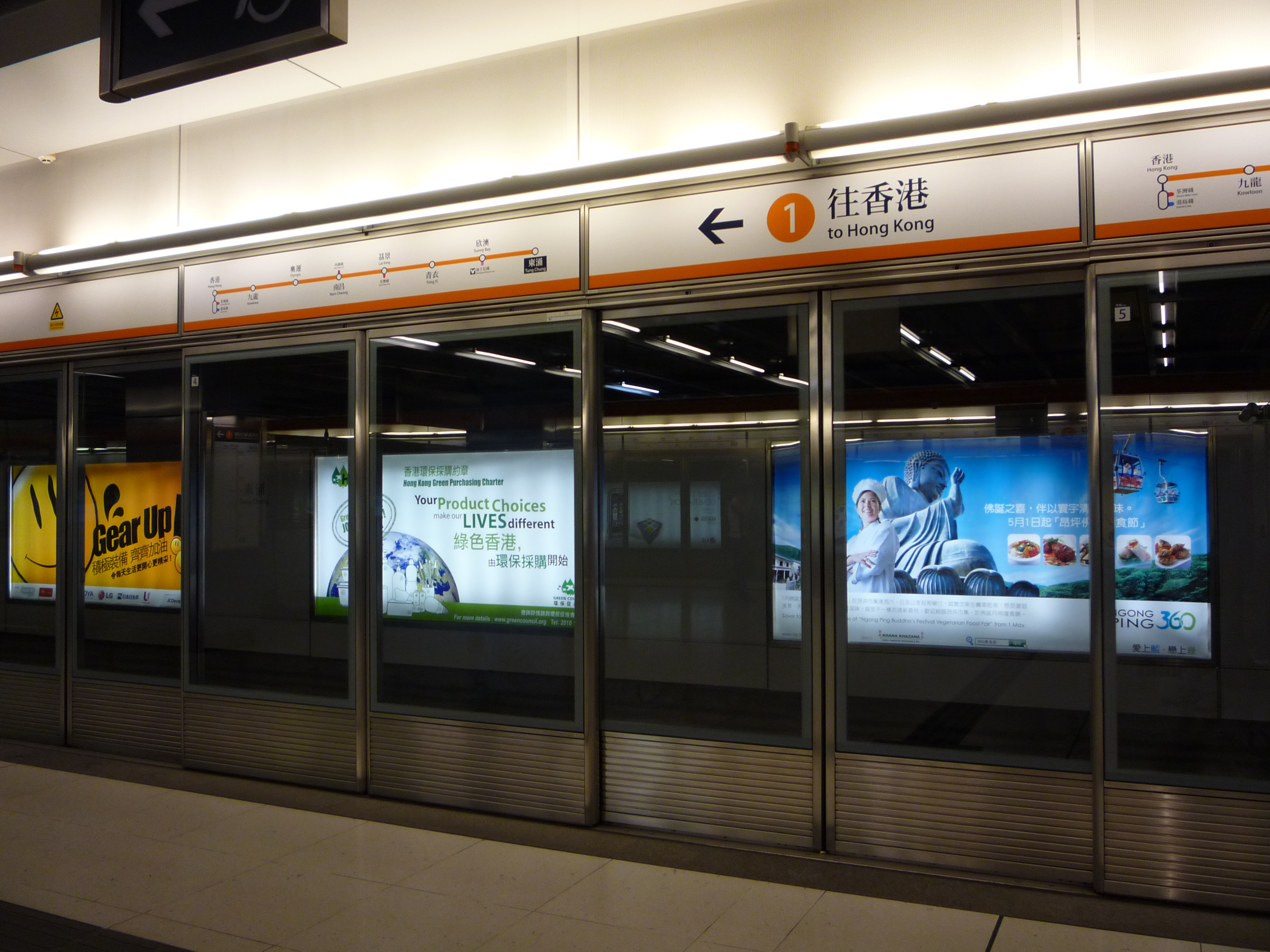
Platform screen doors at Tung Chung station

According to the Mass Transit Railway By-laws, eating, drinking, or smoking are not allowed in the paid area of stations or in trains. Offenders can be fined up to HK$5000.

Various campaigns and activities are taken to help ensure that the MTR is a safe system to travel on. Poster campaigns displaying information on topics such as escalator safety are a common sight in all MTR stations, and announcements are made regularly as safety reminders to travelling passengers. By-laws were also introduced to deter potentially dangerous actions on the MTR, such as the ban on flammable goods on the MTR and rushing into trains when the doors are closing. Penalties ranging from fines to imprisonment have been imposed for such offences.

Police officers patrol the trains and stations, and police posts are available at some stations. The Hong Kong Police Force has a Railway District responsible for the MTR. Closed-circuit television cameras are installed in stations and on some of the newer trains.

The entire Tung Chung line and Airport Express, as well as the stations added by the Tseung Kwan O line, has platform screen doors (PSDs), ordered from Swiss glass door manufacturer Kaba Gilgen AG, installed upon construction. The entire Tuen Ma line has these doors as well, inherited from KCR. These doors make platforms safer by preventing people from falling onto the rails, even though MTRCL did not heavily promote it directly. However, the primary motivation was to separate the stations from the tunnels, hence allowing substantial energy savings on station air-conditioning and tunnel ventilation. Automatic platform gates (APGs) have also been installed at the Sunny Bay and Disneyland Resort stations. Their heights are half of the PSDs and only prevent people from falling onto the rails. MTR has finished installing the APGs on all of the above-ground stations of the MTR except on the East Rail line; they will be installed there as part of the Sha Tin to Central Link project.

In June 2000, MTRCL proceeded with plans to retrofit 2,960 pairs of platform screen doors at all 30 underground stations on the Kwun Tong, Tsuen Wan, and Island lines in a six-year programme. The programme made MTR the world's first railway to undertake the retrofitting of PSDs on a passenger-carrying system already in operation. A prototype design was first introduced at Choi Hung station in the 3rd quarter of 2001. The scheme was completed in October 2005, ahead of the forecast completion date in 2006. MTRCL said that part of the cost had to be assumed by passengers. A HK$0.10 per passenger trip cost was levied on Octopus card users to help fund the HK$2 billion retrofit programme. This levy was ended in 2013 after raising more than HK$1 billion.

== Visual identity ==
The MTR visual identity, which includes a logo resembling runic symbol tvimadur ᛯ, vehicle livery, signage, route maps and passenger information, was updated in 1995–1998 by Lloyd Northover, the British design consultancy founded by John Lloyd and Jim Northover.

MTR has a mascot named "Kee Gor", modeled after a former MTR employee who headed operations.

== Social outreach ==
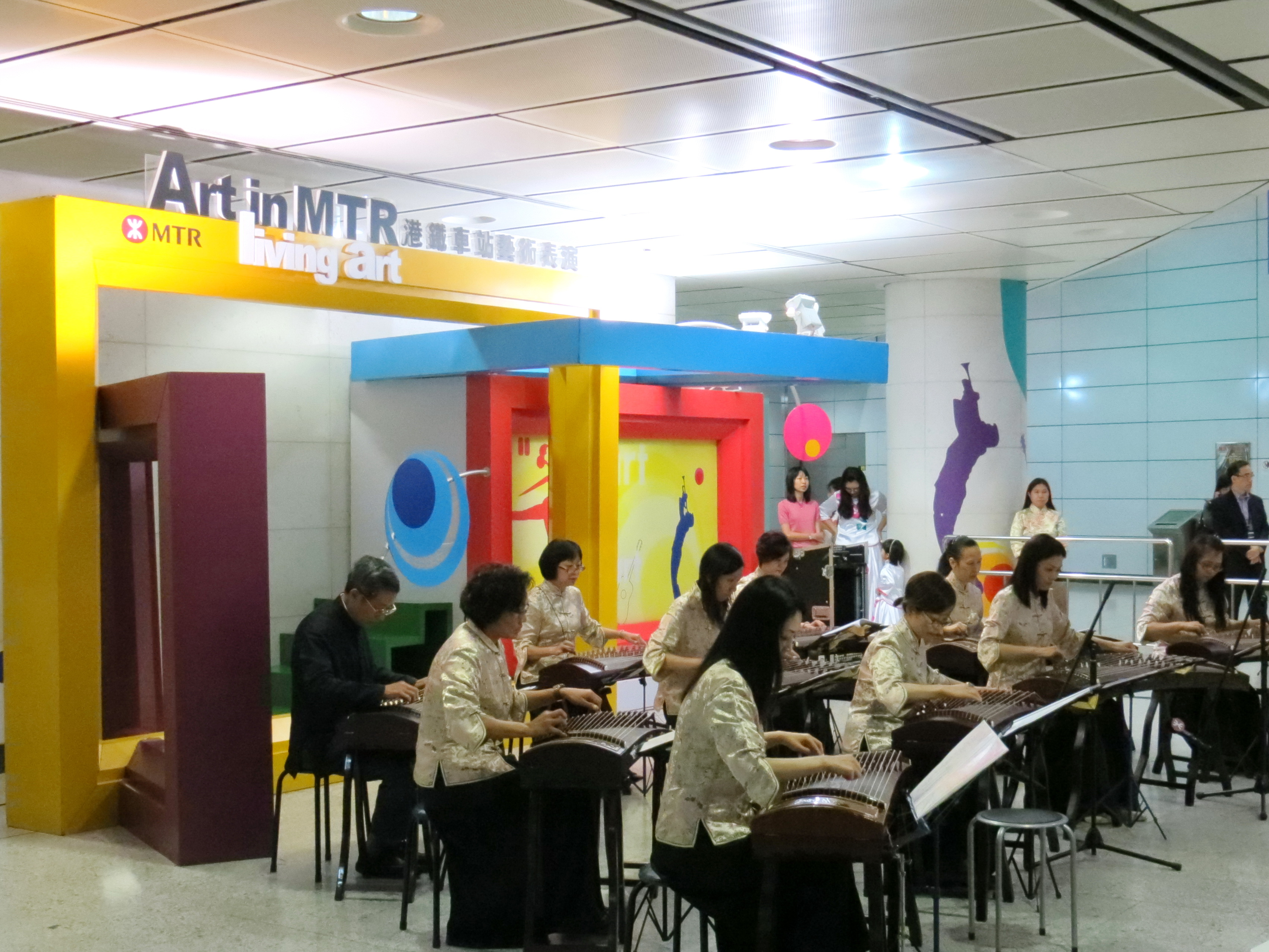
Live art performances in the subway connecting Hong Kong station and Central station

=== Art promotion ===
With the objective "not only bring MTR passengers more time for life, but also more time for art", the Art in MTR Initiative has been a success since its reception in 1998, where the Airport Express Artwork Programme was the pioneer project. Thereafter, live performances, art exhibitions, display of artwork by established and emerging artists, students and young children have been brought into the MTR stations. MTRCL have even made art part of the station architecture when building new stations or renovating existing ones. Artworks are exhibited in different forms on the network, including "arttube", open art gallery, community art galleries, roving art, living art, and art in station architecture.

=== MTR Hong Kong Race Walking ===
MTR and Hong Kong Association of Athletics Affiliates have jointly hosted MTR Hong Kong Race Walking annually in spring since 2005. The race walking competition aims at promoting healthy living in Hong Kong. The race begins and ends on the ground above Central MTR station, namely Chater Garden, Chater Road, Ice House Street and Des Voeux Road Central in Central. There is a fun walk apart from the regular competition. The event attracted over 800 participants in 2005 and 1,500 in 2012. The event is attended not only by Hongkongers, but also athletes from various countries. The race raises fund for Better Health for a Better Hong Kong, a Hospital Authority project for the working population.

== Controversies ==
=== Tree removal ===
The MTR Corporation came under fire in June 2011 after their work on the cross-border high-speed railway line encroached on a conservation area in Pat Heung, Yuen Long. 34 trees were felled and an entire slope was concreted over in the conservation area. The Environmental Protection Department issued summonses to the corporation for offences under the Environmental Impact Assessment Ordinance. In September 2011, a fine of HK$15,000 was imposed by the court. The MTR Corporation admitted that 34 trees were felled by mistake; all were common native woodland species and no rare tree species were affected. The corporation said owing to a technical misalignment of relevant drawings, the plan submitted to the Environmental Protection Department did not include the part of the Conservation Area which was included in the gazettal plan of their works. The corporation became aware that part of the approved tree removal works may have encroached onto the Conservation Area during construction, and proactively reported the situation to the government. Evaluation and measures have been taken to prevent similar incidents from happening again.

The MTR Corporation came under fire again in September 2011 after felling dozens of trees in Admiralty as part of construction work for the South Island line. Green activists denounced the tree felling as "unprofessional", and Ken So Kwok-yin, chief executive of the Conservancy Association and a certified tree arborist, said that the explanations offered by the MTR Corporation as to why the trees were felled were "unacceptable". The MTR Corporation is felling approximately 4,000 trees for the construction of the South Island line, raising concerns from environmental groups and the public about its commitment to protecting Hong Kong's natural environment.

=== Limits on oversized luggage ===
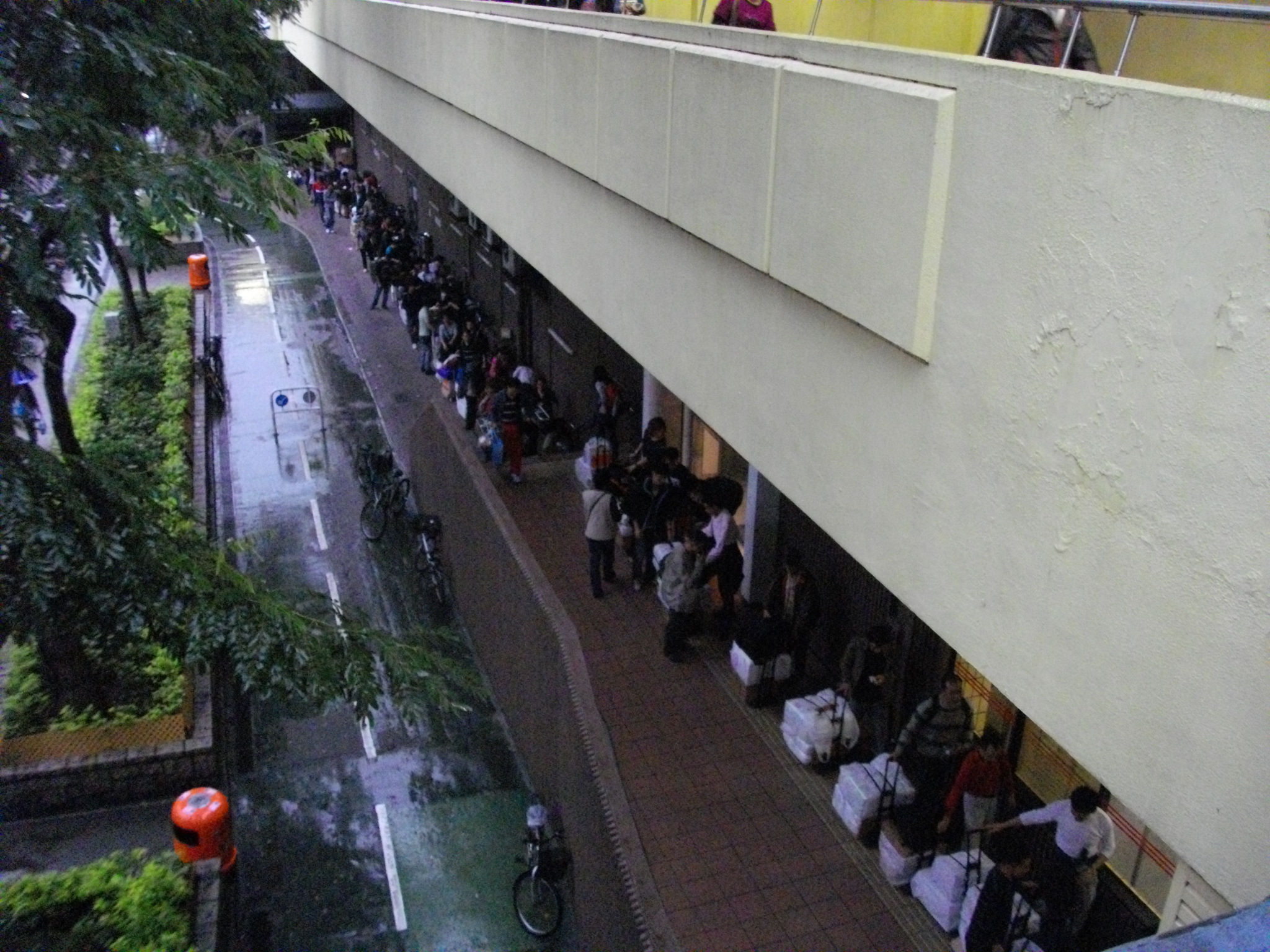
Mainland Chinese parallel traders outside Sheung Shui station

The corporation has limits on the size of items allowed on trains. The MTR system is facing pressure from increasing numbers of parallel traders who carry oversized baggage onto trains for resale in China. The corporation has been criticized for allowing parallel traders to board trains with massive bags, causing undue congestion and inconvenience to residents of the North District.

Furthermore, the corporation accused of double standards in enforcement when images of cross-border smugglers pushing overladen trollies appeared on social network sites on a regular basis, whilst local students carrying large musical instruments were reported to have been stopped and issued with written warnings. Leading musicians joined in the criticism of MTR's stance on large instruments; some citizens invited players of cellos and other large instruments to congregate on 3 October 2015 with their equipment at Tai Wai station, where the majority of these instances occurred.

Following the public uproar, MTR issued a press release in the early hours acknowledging discontent and announcing a one-month review of the policy on oversized items to see whether there was room for fine-tuning that would not compromise on passenger safety. The corporation said that staff would continue executing existing policy until any revisions are made.

=== October 2018 disruption ===
On 16 October 2018, four MTR lines suffered delays simultaneously, an unprecedented disruption to railway services. MTR stated that initial investigations showed that the problems were related to the computers that control the signaling system, and an in-depth investigation would be carried out.

=== Cathay Pacific advertisement ===
In May 2019, the MTR Corporation and the Airport Authority Hong Kong reportedly refused to display a Cathay Pacific advertisement featuring two men holding hands due to its LGBT message.

=== Involvement in 2019–2020 Hong Kong protests ===
==== Yuen Long attack ====
On 21 July 2019, a mob of men dressed in white and carrying wooden sticks and metal pipes entered the MTR's Yuen Long station and assaulted people indiscriminately. The attack is largely believed to have been carried out by pro-Beijing paid thugs. One pregnant woman was hurt and found lying on the floor, and journalists were also attacked. The mob entered the paid area and attacked commuters aboard a train, which was unable to depart. Over 40 people were sent to hospital. After the incident, pro-Beijing legislator Junius Ho was accused of supporting the attack.

==== Prince Edward station attack ====
On 31 August 2019, during the anti-extradition bill protests, Special Tactical Squad officers of the Hong Kong Police Force entered Prince Edward station and attacked people inside. They fired tear gas inside the station and trains, violating guidelines on the use of such products in enclosed spaces. Bystanders were caught in the operation and it has generally been deemed a brutal attempt to stop the protests. Widespread rumours of civilian deaths at the station circulated after discrepancies were noted regarding the number of injuries. The MTR refused to provide CCTV footage filmed during the incident, helping to perpetuate these rumours.

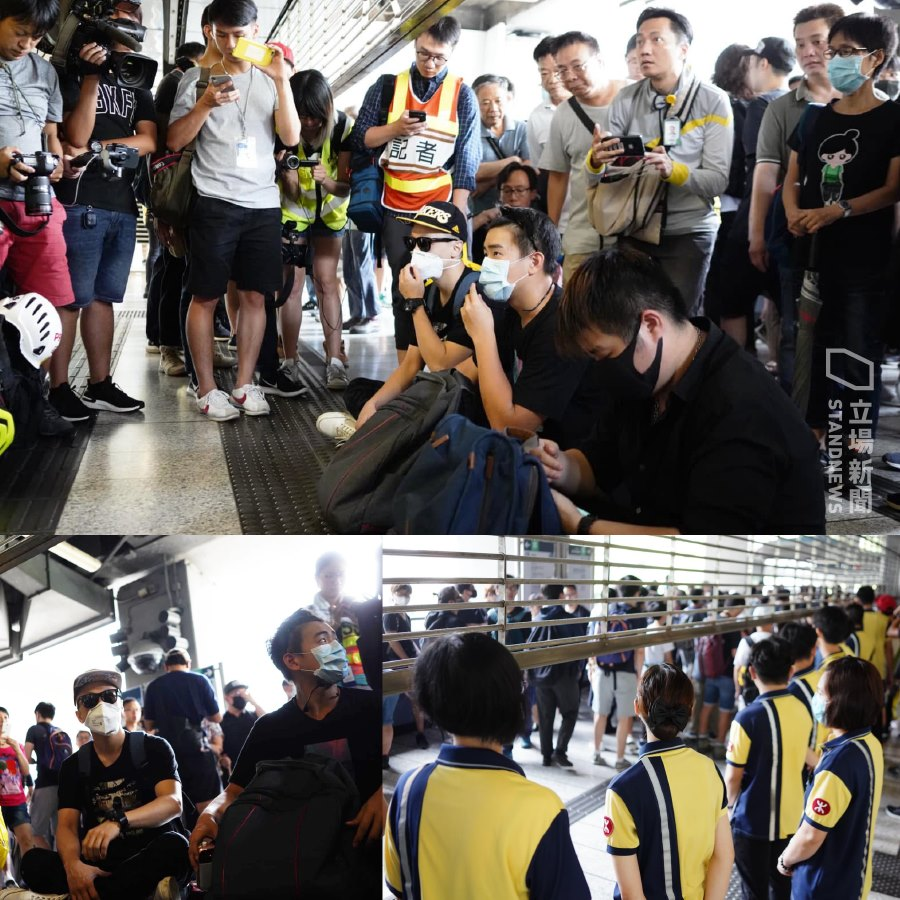
Citizens trying to stop the gate from closing at Kwun Tong station on 24 August 2019, when a protest has just started nearby. They were also demanding the senior management of MTR to come out and provide a valid reason for the closure of stations.

==== Halting of services ====
On multiple occasions during the 2019–2020 Hong Kong protests, MTR has sealed off stations close to locations of protest before their starting time. Supporters of the protests have thus criticised MTR of intentionally impeding the public from attending protests and unnecessarily affecting civilians, giving MTR the nickname "CCP railway" (Chinese: 黨鐵; lit. 'Party railway').

Following a clash between police and protestors in the Yuen Long station on 21 August 2019, the Chinese state media People's Daily published a commentary accusing MTR of "conspiring with protestors" by "arranging special free trains for rioters to escape". In response to the accusation, MTR issued a statement declaring that it will close stations under emergency situations in the future. After that, MTR has on multiple occasions closed off stations close to ongoing protests, for example closing the Lam Tin station, Kwun Tong station and Ngau Tau Kok station on 24 August 2020 before the starting time of a permitted demonstration in Kwun Tong. Similar incidents of varying scale have occurred multiple times later.

==== Arrangement of train for riot police ====
On 24 August 2019, MTR arranged a special train exclusively to carry riot police to Kowloon Bay station, which was closed to the public at that time due to the demonstration nearby at Kwun Tong. This has led to criticisms that MTR is assisting the government in oppressing the freedom of assembly and the freedom of expression in Hong Kong.

== See also ==
- List of MTR stations
- List of metro systems
- Metro systems by annual passenger rides
- MTR fare adjustment mechanism
- Transport in Hong Kong
- List of rapid transit systems
- Urban rail transit in China
- Macau Light Rail Transit

=== Urban rail transit in Mainland China ===
- Dongguan Rail Transit
- Shenzhen Metro
- Guangzhou Metro

=== Other railways in Hong Kong ===
- Hong Kong Tramways
- Peak Tram
