= Tuen Ma line =

Hong Kong MTR railway line

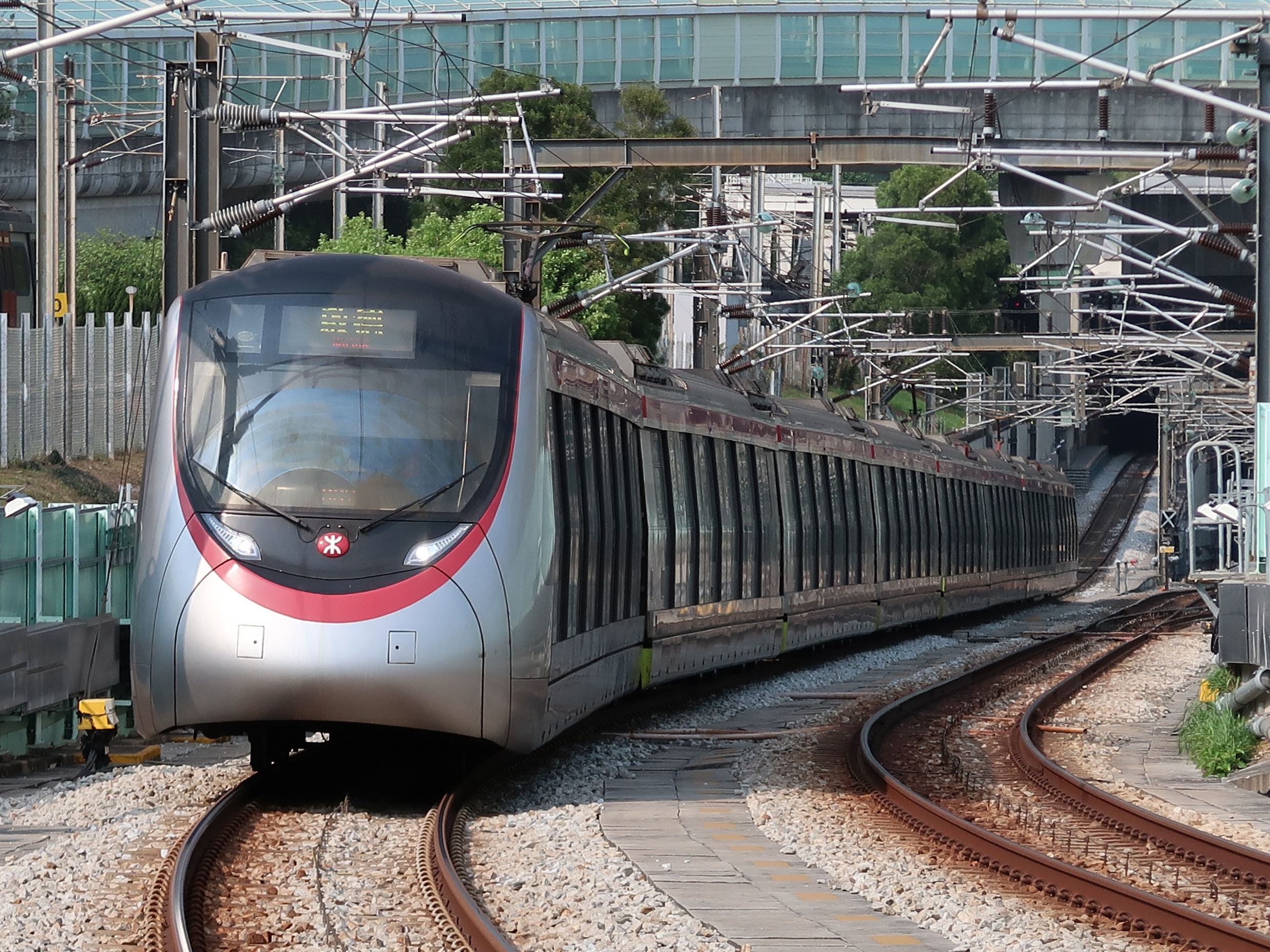
- A CRRC Changchun EMU train approaching Hin Keng station

Overview
- Native name: 屯馬綫
- Status: Operational
- Owner: KCR Corporation (except Ho Man Tin owned by MTR Corporation)
- Locale: Districts: Tuen Mun District, Yuen Long District, Tsuen Wan District, Sham Shui Po District, Yau Tsim Mong District, Kowloon City District, Wong Tai Sin District, Sha Tin District
- Termini: Tuen Mun; Wu Kai Sha
- Continues from: Ma On Shan line / Tuen Ma Line Phase 1 Wu Kai Sha – Tai Wai / Wu Kai Sha – Kai Tak; West Rail line Tuen Mun – Hung Hom
- Connecting lines: East Rail line Via Tai Wai, Hung Hom; Kwun Tong line Via Diamond Hill, Ho Man Tin; Tung Chung line Via Nam Cheong; Tsuen Wan line Via Mei Foo, Tsim Sha Tsui-East Tsim Sha Tsui; Light Rail Via Yuen Long, Tin Shui Wai, Siu Hong, Tuen Mun (Future: Tuen Mun South and A16); Northern Link Via Kam Sheung Road (Future)
- Stations: 27
- Color on map: Brown (#923011)

Service
- Type: Commuter rail / Rapid transit
- System: MTR
- Operator: MTR Corporation
- Depot(s): Tai Wai, Pat Heung, Hung Hom sidings
- Rolling stock: SP1900 EMU (IKK-train); CRRC Changchun C1141A EMU
- Ridership: 5,000,000 weekday average

History
- Planned opening: 2030 (Tuen Mun South extension; Tuen Mun South to Tuen Mun)
- Opened: 20 December 2003 (KCR West Rail; Tuen Mun to Nam Cheong); 24 October 2004 (Tsim Sha Tsui Spur Line; East Tsim Sha Tsui to Hung Hom); 21 December 2004 (Ma On Shan Rail; Wu Kai Sha to Tai Wai); 16 August 2009 (Kowloon Southern Link; Nam Cheong to East Tsim Sha Tsui); 14 February 2020 (Phase 1; Tai Wai to Kai Tak); 27 June 2021 (Full Line; Kai Tak to Hung Hom)

Technical
- Line length: 56.193 km (34.917 mi)
- Number of tracks: Double-track
- Track gauge: 1,435 mm (4 ft 8 1/2 in) standard gauge
- Electrification: 25 kV 50 Hz AC (Overhead line)
- Operating speed: Average: 45 km/h (28 mph); Maximum: 130 km/h (81 mph)
- Signalling: SelTrac CBTC
Route map

Tuen Ma line
- Traditional Chinese: 屯馬綫
- Simplified Chinese: 屯马线
Transcriptions
Standard Mandarin
- Hanyu Pinyin: Tún Mǎ xiàn
- Wade–Giles: Tun^{2} Ma^{3} hsien^{4}
Hakka
- Romanization: Tûn-Ma-Sien
Yue: Cantonese
- Yale Romanization: Tyùn Máh sin
- Jyutping: Tyun4 Maa5 sin3

The Tuen Ma line (Chinese: 屯馬綫) is a commuter rail / rapid transit line that forms part of the Mass Transit Railway (MTR) system in Hong Kong. It is 56.193 kilometres (34.917 mi) in length, making it the longest line of the MTR network. It has a total of 27 stations, more than any other in the MTR system.

The Tuen Ma line is formed by a merger of two former MTR lines, the West Rail line and the Ma On Shan line via a new stretch of mostly underground railway known as the "Tai Wai to Hung Hom section" (大圍至紅磡段) of the Sha Tin to Central Link project. It consists of 11 kilometres (6.8 mi) of track and six new intermediate stations. The Tai Wai to Kai Tak section (大圍至啟德段) opened on 14 February 2020, while the Kai Tak to Hung Hom section opened on 27 June 2021, thereby completing the line.

During the planning and construction phase, this line was referred to as the "East West Corridor" (東西走廊). On 25 May 2018, the operational name "Tuen Ma line" was confirmed by the MTR Corporation, reflecting the names of Tuen Mun and Ma On Shan, Tuen Mun being the terminal of the West Rail line and Ma On Shan being the namesake of the Ma On Shan Line. The full journey time is about 73 minutes.

== Overview ==
Route of the Tuen Ma line

The 56.2 kilometre long line starts at Tuen Mun station, Tuen Mun and ends at Wu Kai Sha in Wu Kai Sha, Ma On Shan. There are ten interchange stations: Tai Wai and Hung Hom with the East Rail line; Diamond Hill and Ho Man Tin with the Kwun Tong line; Nam Cheong with the Tung Chung line; Mei Foo with the Tsuen Wan line; Yuen Long, Tin Shui Wai, Siu Hong and Tuen Mun which connects to the Light Rail. The line has two maintenance depots at Tai Wai and Pat Heung.

Like all MTR lines, the Tuen Ma line is entirely grade separated. It is mainly underground in the urban sections of Kowloon and Tsuen Wan, and at-grade or elevated in the rest of the New Territories.

Most of the original Ma On Shan line (between Tai Wai and Wu Kai Sha) is built on a viaduct on a rail reservation that existed from the outset of the development of Ma On Shan New Town. However, the section between Shek Mun and Tai Shui Hang is at ground level, located between the carriageways of the Tate's Cairn Highway, along with the section between Tai Wai to Hin Keng, which is also partially on an embankment running parallel with the East Rail line. The line then enters Lion Rock Tunnel, which takes trains under Lion Rock Country Park. It continues underground through Diamond Hill station and Kowloon City before emerging into open air near Hung Hom station at ground level.

After Hung Hom, the line descends underground and around southern Kowloon Peninsula through East Tsim Sha Tsui and Austin stations, before returning to ground level (though still fully covered) at Nam Cheong station. The line then continues northwest through a sealed box tunnel just to the north of and under the West Kowloon Highway through Lai Chi Kok Park into Mei Foo station. Bored tunnels traverse the densely populated Kwai Chung and under the Tsuen Wan line towards Tsuen Wan West station. It continues through a 5.5 km (3.4 mi) bored rock tunnel, the Tai Lam Tunnel, that takes trains through Tai Lam Country Park.

The line then emerges from the tunnel just south of the train depot at Pat Heung and initially runs at-grade, and later on an embankment as it approaches Kam Sheung Road station. The rest of the line is fully elevated and constructed on a continuous viaduct, running in a westerly direction through the new towns of Yuen Long, then turns towards the south at Tin Shui Wai and continuing along the Tuen Mun River and eventually terminating at Tuen Mun station.

Construction methods predominantly include tunnel boring machines and cut-and-cover, though the Lion Rock Tunnel between Hin Keng and the Ma Chai Hang Recreation Ground was constructed using the drill-and-blast method.

While road and rail traffic in Hong Kong move on the left, the eastern section of the Tuen Ma line is an exception, as trains move on the right, like metro systems and road traffic in mainland China (but mainline rail moves on the left), between Sung Wong Toi and Wu Kai Sha. This allows the southbound tracks of this line and the East Rail Line to run opposite each other at Tai Wai, facilitating cross-platform interchange there. This design was to speed up southbound passenger interchange between the East Rail line and Tuen Ma line during the morning commute.

Right-hand running is maintained as far as Sung Wong Toi, before the line goes into a stacked formation at To Kwa Wan, which has a split platform layout to allow the tracks to switch sides. Left-hand running is then used on the remainder section of the line.

As the section of the former Ma One Shan line opened as part of the KCR system, there are no ticket gates between the Ma On Shan Rail and East Rail platforms at Tai Wai. A trip between either lines counted as a single trip. There was no direct connection between these two lines and the West Rail while they were part of the KCR network.

== Rolling stock ==
For much of its existence, the Ma On Shan line was, in the Hong Kong context, classified as a medium-capacity system. However, it is capable of passenger volumes of up to 32,000 passengers per hour per direction (PPHPD), which is comparable to the passenger capacity of a full rapid transit or "metro" system. Furthermore, the line has been upgraded to the standard of a full-capacity system in anticipation of the Sha Tin to Central Link, which will extend it to the heart of Kowloon and result in a merger with the full-capacity West Rail line.

KCRC initially ordered 18 sets of 4-car SP1950 trains, built by Kinki Sharyo, running on the Ma On Shan line; they have all since been converted to eight cars. The train is the same model as the SP1900 sets used on the East Rail and West Rail lines, which runs on those lines with twelve-car (now nine-car following the introduction of the R-train) and eight-car configurations respectively (previously seven cars on the latter, though all has been converted to eight cars and used on the entire line following its completion). They were the only trains in use until March 2017, when newly built eight-car Tuen Ma line trains, manufactured by CRRC Changchun Railway Vehicles, entered service on the Ma On Shan line. Both of these models have a maximum running speed of 160 km/h (99 mph), but only reach a maximum service speed of 130 km/h (81 mph) on the long section between Kam Sheung Road and Tsuen Wan West stations. Unlike the trains on the East Rail line, there are no first-class compartments. All trains were serviced at Tai Wai depot and are equipped with the SelTrac IS moving-block signalling system for train protection, with provision for upgrading to the radio-based SelTrac CBTC at a later stage to increase capacity.

The first two converted 8-car SP1900 trains were introduced to the Ma On Shan line on 15 January 2017. During the transition period with both 4-car and 8-car trains in service, passengers had to pay attention to the platform LCD screens and announcements to queue at the right part of the platforms. Since December 2017, the Ma On Shan line has been run fully by 8-car trains and all stations retrofitted with automatic platform gates identical to those installed at elevated stations on MTR's other lines.

The former West Rail line was served by 33 eight-car SP1900 trains built by a Japanese consortium of Itochu, Kinki Sharyo and Kawasaki Heavy Industries, of which 22 were originally ordered by KCRC as seven-car trains for the initial opening of the line. Up to 26 sets run during the morning peak service with a 171-second headway; MTRC specifies capacities of 52 seated and 286 standing passengers per car. Beginning in January 2016, all 7-car trains on the former West Rail line were converted to 8-car trains in anticipation of the Sha Tin to Central Link; this was completed in May 2018. During the transition period with both 7-car and 8-car trains in service, passengers had to pay attention to the platform LCD screens and announcements to queue at the right part of the platforms. They were the only trains in use on the line until March 2020, when a newly built eight-car EMU, manufactured by CRRC Changchun Railway Vehicles, entered service on the line.

== History ==
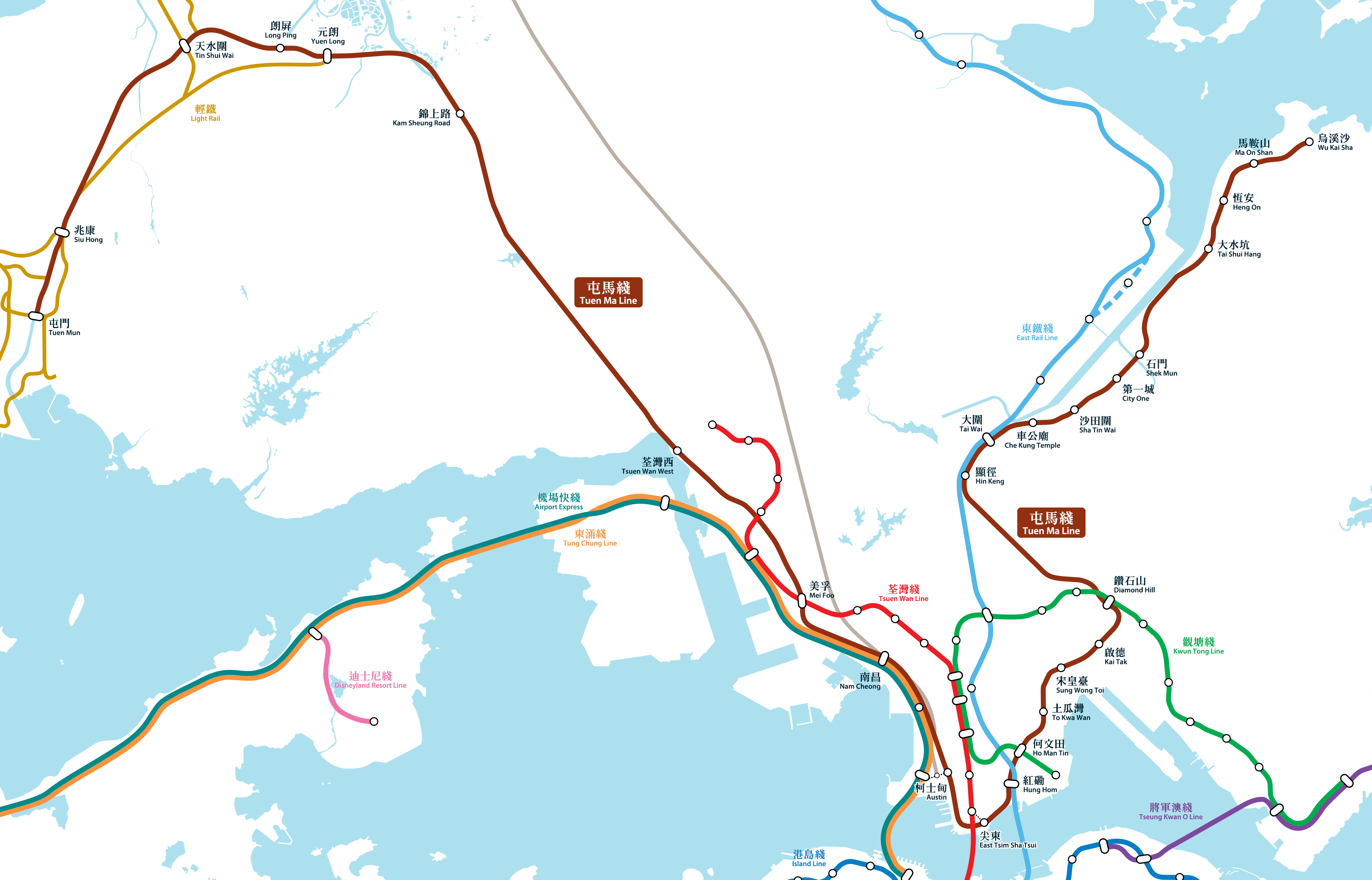
Geographically accurate map of the Tuen Ma line

Before the merger of the two major Hong Kong railway operators, the MTR Corporation (MTRC) and the Kowloon-Canton Railway Corporation (KCRC) rail networks in 2007, both the West Rail (opened in 2003) and the Ma On Shan Rail (opened in 2004) were operated by KCRC. Both railways were envisaged to be extended in the near future and platforms on the Ma On Shan line were built with reserved structures for extension at a later date.

Both MTRC and KCRC independently submitted their own proposals to the Hong Kong government for developing the Sha Tin to Central Link (SCL) by extending their own existing networks. After numerous revisions of their proposals, the government eventually approved the scheme by KCRC, which involved joining the West Rail and the Ma On Shan Rail via the Wong Tai Sin and Kowloon City districts (the phase 1 East West Corridor), and extending East Rail line to Hong Kong Island's central business district (phase 2 North South Corridor).

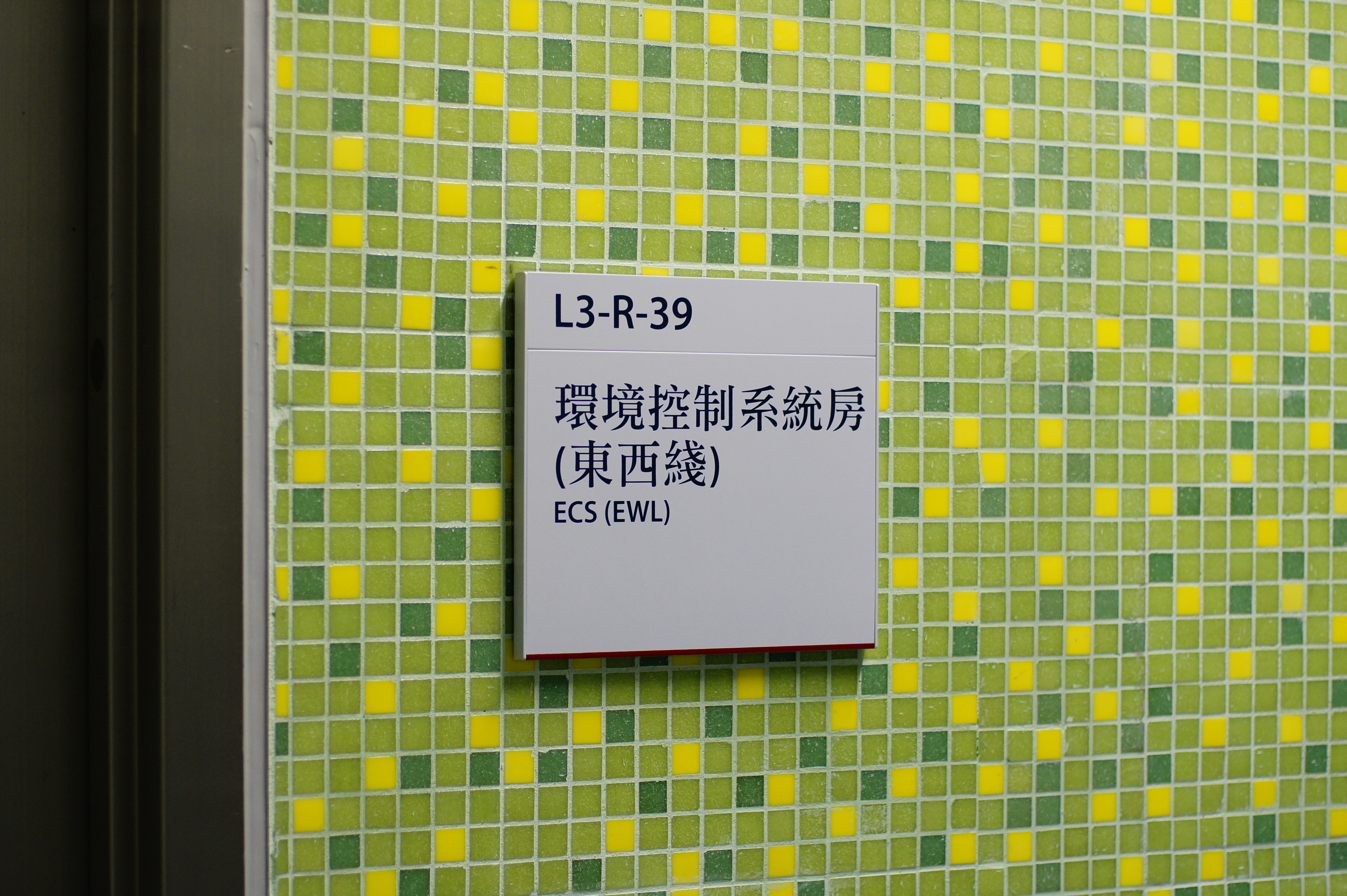
The sign bearing the name "EWL" (東西綫) at Ho Man Tin Station during construction.

After the 2007 network merger, operations of all transport services (East Rail, West Rail, Ma On Shan Rail, Light Rail, feeder buses and Guangzhou–Kowloon through train) of the KCRC were leased to the MTRC for 50 years. The MTRC also rebranded the three commuter railways to East Rail line, West Rail line and Ma On Shan linetts like their own railways. Subsequently, the approved SCL schemes fall into the hands of the MTRC.

The construction of East West Corridor, which largely followed an alignment proposed by the MTRC in the 1970s as the East Kowloon line and later shelved, began in August 2016. At the time, it was unclear how MTRC would name the new lines or whether they would retain the provisional names "East West Corridor" and "North South Corridor"; the word "corridor" would set a precedent in the naming convention of MTR lines. Speculation of a "East West Line" arose when a photograph of an info plate printed with "EWL" (東西綫) at Ho Man Tin station while it was under construction surfaced. The plate was removed before the opening of the station that year as part of the Kwun Tong line extension to Whampoa. MTRC eventually announced on 25 May 2018 that the operational name was the Tuen Ma line.

=== Construction defects and delay ===
The Tuen Ma line was planned to be fully operational in 2019, but after the newly built platforms at Hung Hom station failed a safety inspection which occurred between December 2018 and January 2019, its full opening was postponed by about two years.

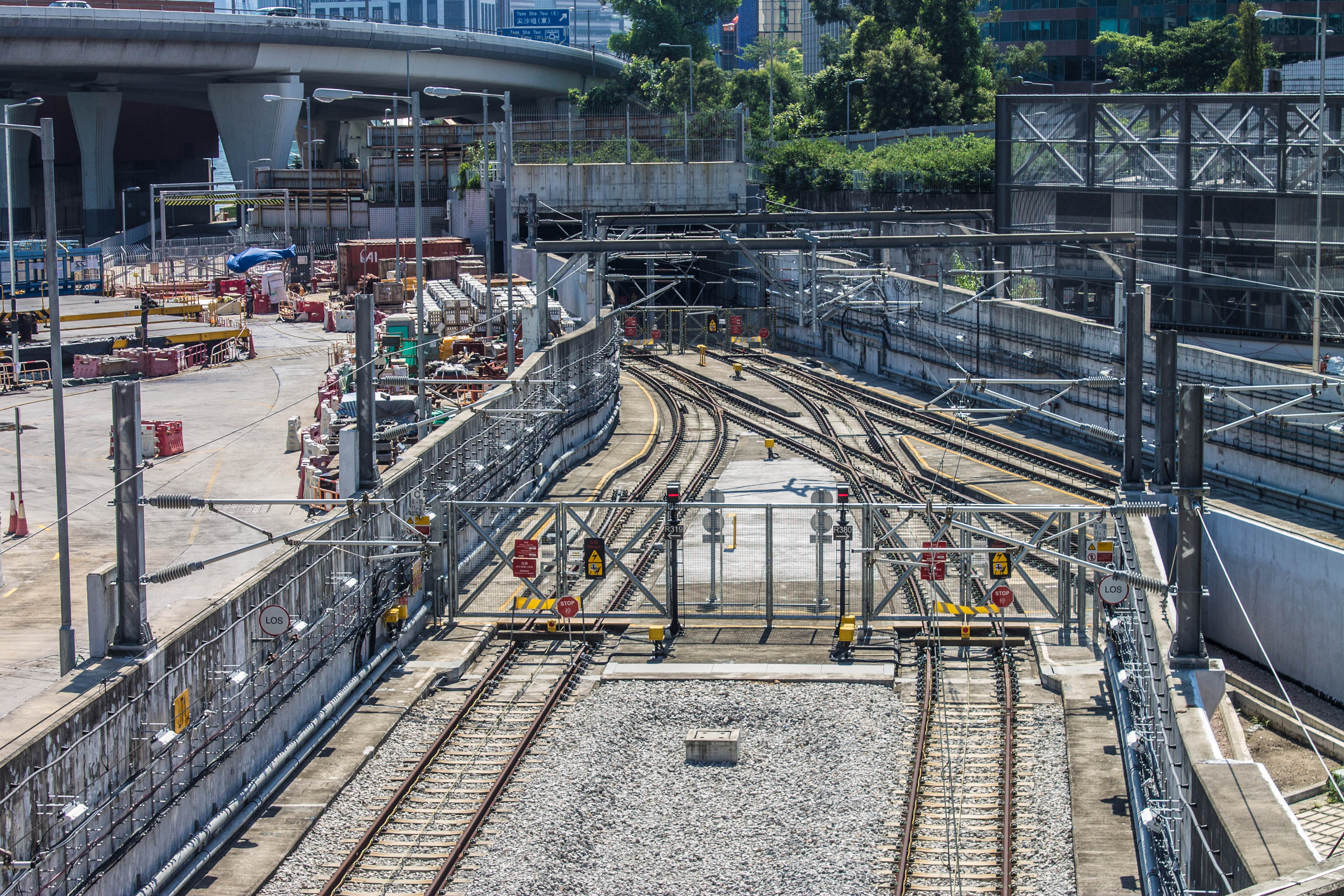
View of the new tracks of the Tuen Ma Line connecting the former Ma On Shan and West Rail lines at the southern end of Hung Hom station in 2019.

The head contractor of the SCL construction, Leighton Asia, subsidiary of the CIMIC Group, was accused of covering up construction defects until a whistleblower from a subcontractor leaked photo evidence to the press. This led to more thorough investigations, hearings and inspections behind the set concrete for assessing if it would require demolition and rebuilding the structure from scratch. The Hong Kong government also expressed disappointment in the MTRC executives for their incompetent supervision.

Michael Tien, former KCRC chairman, suggested that it was technically feasible to have the Ma On Shan line be initially extended from Tai Wai to Diamond Hill station instead of delaying the opening of the entire line. This has the advantage of spreading the Kowloon bound traffic between Tai Wai and Kowloon Tong stations of the East Rail Line, which is overcrowded during peak hours. However, the then MTRC chairman, Frederick Ma, insisted that they aimed at inaugurating the whole line in mid-2019 to avoid the extra resources required for operating the line in separate phases.

On 18 July 2019, the Transport and Housing Bureau announced that the Tuen Ma line would open in two phases. On 14 February 2020, the Ma On Shan Line was extended from Tai Wai station to Kai Tak station because the latter has a crossover track which permits the operation of the station as a terminus. The extension, named Tuen Ma line Phase 1, was expected to alleviate significant congestion on the East Rail line between Tai Wai and Kowloon Tong stations in preparation for the shortening of trainsets as part of preparatory works for the cross-harbour extension of that line. The remaining section of the Tuen Ma line, from Kai Tak to Hung Hom, opened on 27 June 2021.

=== Future extensions ===
In May 2020, the Government submitted a proposal for the Tuen Mun South Extension to the Legislative Council Subcommittee on Railway Matters. In addition to the "Railway Development Strategy 2014", which includes a proposal for Tuen Mun South station near the Tuen Mun Ferry Pier, the MTRCL has proposed in the latest project proposal to add an additional station in Tuen Mun Area 16. Building an intermediate section in Tuen Mun Area 16 will require the Tuen Mun Swimming Pool to be relocated. A possible relocation for the Tuen Mun Swimming Pool is at the Tuen Mun Golf Centre; the specific plan depends on the technical feasibility study. If, after research, it is confirmed that the above-mentioned location is not suitable, MTRCL will identify other possible locations. Considering that the detailed planning and design of the project will take about two to three years, the Tuen Mun South Extension started construction in 2023 and will be completed in 2030. The government has invited MTRCL to carry out the detailed planning and design of the Tuen Mun South Extension project, and will negotiate with the MTR Corporation on the financing arrangements for the Tuen Mun South Extension on the basis of the "ownership" model for the project.

== Train services ==
- Weekdays
  - Morning peak: 20-23tph (2.7-3.0 mins)
  - Evening peak: 18-19tph (3.2-3.5mins)
- Weekdays non-peak hours / Sundays and public holidays: 9-10tph (6-7.3mins)
- Saturdays: 9-13tph(4.7-7.3mins)

Not all trains on Tuen Ma line run the entirely of the line. Shorter trips occur regularly during peak hours and at the start or end of service:

| Origin | Destination |
East-bound
| Tuen Mun | Hung Hom, Diamond Hill, or Wu Kai Sha |
| Tin Shui Wai, Tsuen Wan West, East Tsim Sha Tsui or Tai Wai | Wu Kai Sha or City One |
West-bound
| Wu Kai Sha | Tai Wai, Hung Hom, Mei Foo or Tuen Mun |
| City One, Ho Man Tin, Hung Hom, East Tsim Sha Shui, Nam Cheong or Kam Sheung Road | Tuen Mun or Tsuen Wan West |

Late train services

Currently, the Tuen Ma line does not run 24 hour services. After the last train to Tuen Mun departing from Wu Kai Sha, 3 trains will run to Hung Hom(Westbound) then after the 0014 service from Wu Kai Sha to Hung Hom all trains westbound after that service will run to Tai Wai. After the last train to Wu Kai Sha departing from Tuen Mun, 1 eastbound service will run to Hung Hom.

== Stations ==
The following is a list of the stations on the Tuen Ma line.

| Livery and name | | Length (km) | Image | Connections | Opening date | District | Original line |
| English | Chinese | Length (km) | Image | Connections | Opening date | District | Original line |
|---|---|---|---|---|---|---|---|
Tuen Ma Line (TML)
| Wu Kai Sha | 烏溪沙 | 0.0 | | — | 21 December 2004 | Sha Tin | Ma On Shan line |
| Ma On Shan | 馬鞍山 | 1.4 | | — | 21 December 2004 | Sha Tin | Ma On Shan line |
| Heng On | 恆安 | 2.5 | | — | 21 December 2004 | Sha Tin | Ma On Shan line |
| Tai Shui Hang | 大水坑 | 3.5 | | — | 21 December 2004 | Sha Tin | Ma On Shan line |
| Shek Mun | 石門 | 6.5 | | — | 21 December 2004 | Sha Tin | Ma On Shan line |
| City One | 第一城 | 7.2 | | — | 21 December 2004 | Sha Tin | Ma On Shan line |
| Sha Tin Wai | 沙田圍 | 8.3 | | — | 21 December 2004 | Sha Tin | Ma On Shan line |
| Che Kung Temple | 車公廟 | 9.3 | | — | 21 December 2004 | Sha Tin | Ma On Shan line |
| Tai Wai | 大圍 | 10.1 | | East Rail line | 15 August 1983 | Sha Tin | Ma On Shan line |
| Hin Keng | 顯徑 | 11.4 | | — | 14 February 2020 | Sha Tin | New stations |
| Diamond Hill | 鑽石山 | 15.8 | | Kwun Tong line; East Kowloon line (proposed) | 1 October 1979 | Wong Tai Sin | New stations |
| Kai Tak | 啟德 | 17.1 | | — | 14 February 2020 | Kowloon City | New stations |
| Sung Wong Toi | 宋皇臺 | 18.1 | | — | 27 June 2021 | Kowloon City | New stations |
| To Kwa Wan | 土瓜灣 | 19.2 | | — | 27 June 2021 | Kowloon City | New stations |
| Ho Man Tin | 何文田 | 20.3 | | Kwun Tong line | 23 October 2016 | Kowloon City | New stations |
| Hung Hom | 紅磡 | 21.0 | | East Rail line; ~~Through Train services to Mainland China~~ (service halted indefinitely in 2020; formally disused in 2024) | 30 November 1975 (Note: Originally opened as part of the Kowloon–Canton Railway.) relocated on 20 June 2021 | Yau Tsim Mong | West Rail line |
| East Tsim Sha Tsui | 尖東 | 22.2 | | Tsuen Wan line (Tsim Sha Tsui) (Note: East Tsim Sha Tsui and Tsim Sha Tsui stations are physically connected by underground walkways outside the stations' paid areas. The out-of-station interchange is only free for passengers using an Octopus card; passengers travelling with Single Journey Tickets need to buy another ticket for the trip after the interchange, with a resulting higher cost.) | 24 October 2004 (Note: Originally opened as part of the East Rail line.) | Yau Tsim Mong | West Rail line |
| Austin | 柯士甸 | 23.9 | | West Kowloon: High-speed rail services to Mainland China; Kowloon: Tung Chung line Airport Express | 16 August 2009 | Yau Tsim Mong | West Rail line |
| Nam Cheong | 南昌 | 26.7 | | Tung Chung line | 16 December 2003 | Sham Shui Po | West Rail line |
| Mei Foo | 美孚 | 29.1 | | Tsuen Wan line | 17 May 1982 | Sham Shui Po | West Rail line |
| Tsuen Wan West | 荃灣西 | 33.5 | | — (Note: Tsuen Wan West station of the West Rail line and Tsuen Wan station of the Tsuen Wan line are not physically linked, but green public light bus route 95K (free transfer with an immediate West Rail journey record on the Octopus card) connects the two stations. It normally takes 15–20 minutes to go to Tsuen Wan station on foot.) | 20 December 2003 | Tsuen Wan | West Rail line |
| Kam Sheung Road | 錦上路 | 42.4 | | Northern Link (under construction) | 20 December 2003 | Yuen Long | West Rail line |
| Yuen Long | 元朗 | 45.9 | | Yuen Long: 610 614 615 761P | 20 December 2003 | Yuen Long | West Rail line |
| Long Ping | 朗屏 | 47.0 | | — | 20 December 2003 | Yuen Long | West Rail line |
| Tin Shui Wai | 天水圍 | 49.3 | | Tin Shui Wai: 705 706 751 751P; Tin Yiu: 705 706 761P | 20 December 2003 | Yuen Long | West Rail line |
| Hung Shui Kiu | 洪水橋 | ? | | | 2030 (Expected) | Yuen Long | Under Construction |
| Siu Hong | 兆康 | 54.3 | | Siu Hong: 505 610 614 614P 615 615P 751 | 20 December 2003 | Tuen Mun | West Rail line |
| Tuen Mun | 屯門 | 56.2 | | Tuen Mun: 505 507 751 | 20 December 2003 | Tuen Mun | West Rail line |
| A16 | 第16區 | ? | | Hoi Wong Road: 507614614P | 2030 (Expected) | Tuen Mun | Under Construction |
| Tuen Mun South | 屯門南 | ? | | Tuen Mun Ferry Pier: 507610614614P615615P; Siu Hei: 507 614 614P | 2030 (Expected) | Tuen Mun | Under Construction |
