= Siu Hei =

Siu Hei may refer to:

- Siu Hei Court, a public housing estate in Tuen Mun, Hong Kong
- Siu Hei stop, an MTR Light Rail stop adjacent to the estate
