= Area 16 =

Area 16 may refer to:

- Nevada Test Site Area 16, in Nye County, Nevada, United States
- A16 station, in Tuen Mun Area 16, New Territories, Hong Kong
