= Tuen Mun Swimming Pool =

Tuen Mun Swimming Pool may refer to:

- Tuen Mun Swimming Pool (aquatics centre), one of the aquatics centres in the New Territories, Hong Kong
- Tuen Mun Swimming Pool stop, a light rail transit stop named after the swimming pool
