= Tuen Mun South extension =

Proposed Hong Kong railway extension

Tuen Mun South extension 屯門南延綫

Overview
- Owner: MTR Corporation
- Locale: Tuen Mun District
- Termini: Tuen Mun South (through service to Tuen Ma line); Tuen Mun
- Stations: 2

Service
- Type: Heavy rail
- System: MTR
- Operator: MTR Corporation
- Depot(s): Pat Heung, Tai Wai
- Rolling stock: SP1900 EMU (IKK-train); CRRC Changchun EMU (TML C-train)

History
- Opened: 2030; 4 years' time

Technical
- Line length: 2.4 km (1.5 mi)
- Track gauge: 1,435 mm (4 ft 8 1/2 in)
- Electrification: 25 kV 50 Hz AC Overhead lines

The Tuen Mun South extension is a proposed 2.4-kilometre (1.5 mi) extension of the MTR rapid transit network in Hong Kong. It extends the existing train service of Tuen Ma line to the tentatively named A16 station in Tuen Mun Area 16 and ultimately a new northern terminus, Tuen Mun South (Chinese: 屯門南), near Tuen Mun Ferry Pier. The extension will extend southwards from the current northern terminus, Tuen Mun station. The journey time from Tuen Mun South to Tuen Mun is estimated to be approximately 5 minutes. The track is planned to run on a viaduct.

== History ==
The Tuen Mun South extension was one of the railway expansion projects recommended by the Railway Development Strategy 2014 (RDS-2014), published by the Hong Kong government's Transport and Housing Bureau in September 2014. The stated rationale for the project was to improve rail access to the area south of Tuen Mun town centre, serving the sizeable population living near Tuen Mun Ferry Pier. The RDS-2014 envisaged that the scheme, comprising an elevated one-stop extension of the West Rail to southern Tuen Mun, would be implemented between 2019 and 2022, and would cost an estimated HK$5.5 billion in 2013 prices.

In February 2016, the Hong Kong government invited the MTR Corporation to submit a proposal for the project.

In May 2020, the government invited the MTR to proceed with detailed planning and design. In addition to the new "Tuen Mun South" terminus outlined in RDS-2014, the government announced plans to build an intermediate station in Tuen Mun Area 16, currently home to Tuen Mun Swimming Pool (namesake of the nearby Light Rail station), tentatively called "A16 station". At that time, approximately 60,000 people lived within a 500-metre catchment of Tuen Mun South station, while about 49,000 residents lived within the same distance of A16 station. As the area around A16 station includes a lot of vacant land, the new station is intended to encourage housing development there. The existing Tuen Mun Swimming Pool and other community facilities currently occupying Tuen Mun Area 16 will need to be demolished and reprovisioned elsewhere. The government expects that construction may commence in 2023.
