= Tuen Mun South station =

Future MTR station in the New Territories, Hong Kong

Tuen Mun South 屯門南
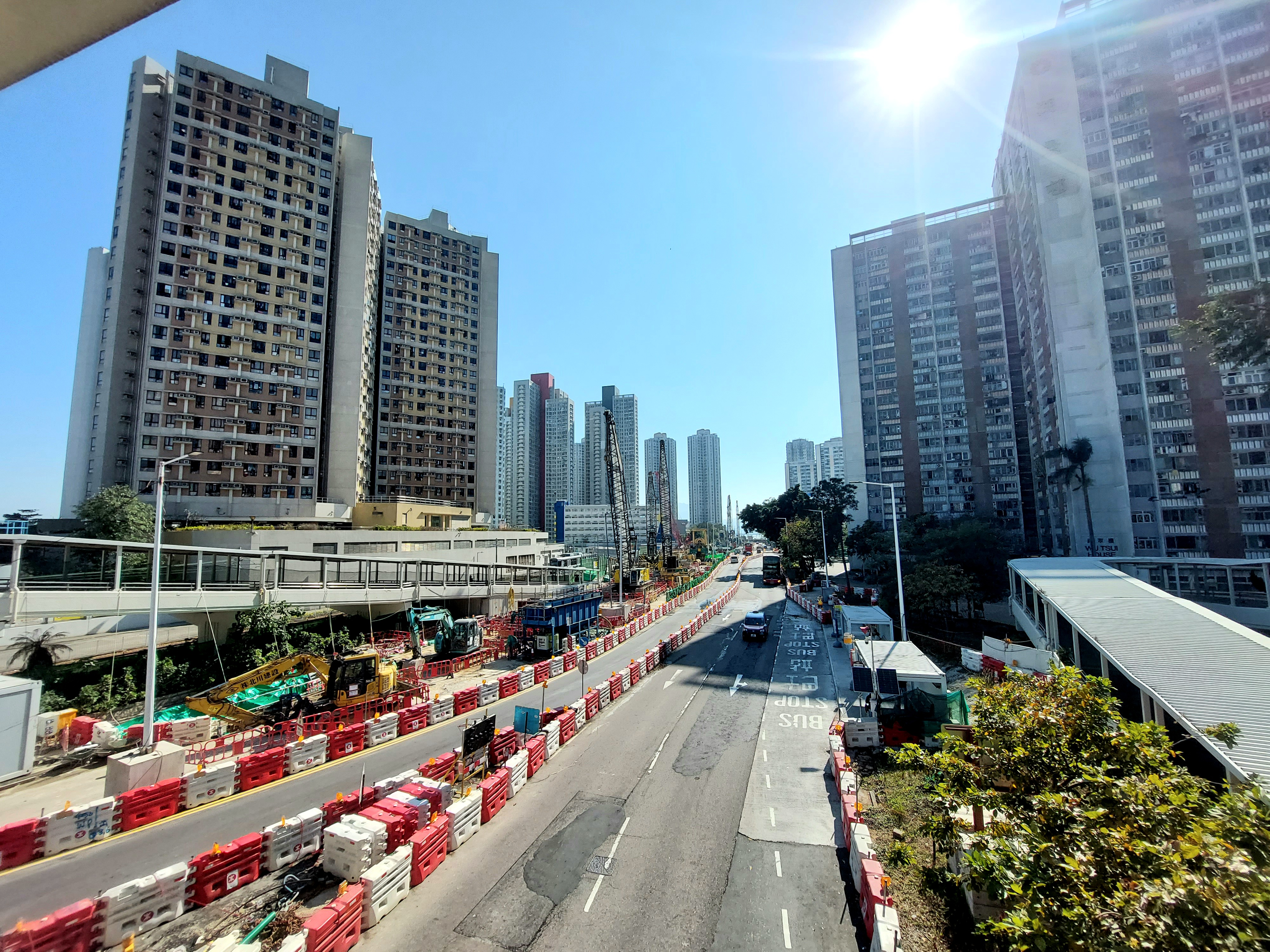
- Aerial view of the station construction site (January 2026)

General information
- Location: Wu King Road × Wu Chui Road; Tuen Mun District, New Territories; Hong Kong
- Coordinates: 22°22′27″N 113°57′56″E
- System: Under construction MTR rapid transit station
- Owner: MTR Corporation
- Operator: MTR Corporation
- Line: Tuen Ma line
- Platforms: 1 bay platform
- Tracks: 2

Construction
- Structure type: Elevated

Other information
- Status: Gazetted
- Station code: TMS
- Website: Tuen Mun South Extension

History
- Opening: 2030; 4 years' time

Key dates
- 2020: Planning and design commences
- 2022: Project gazetted under the Railways Ordinance
- 2022: Environmental permit approved
- 2023: Expected commencement of construction
- 2030: Expected completion of construction

Services
Preceding station	MTR	Following station
Terminus	Tuen Ma line Tuen Mun South extension	A16 towards Wu Kai Sha
Location
- Location within MTR

Tuen Mun South is the future western terminus of MTR's Tuen Ma line. It is to be constructed elevated across Wu King Road and Wu Chui Road in Tuen Mun, Hong Kong. The construction of the station is gazetted as part of the Tuen Mun South extension by the Hong Kong Government in January 2022. The station is expected to open for service in 2030.

== Station layout ==
The station will have a bay platform built elevated above Wu King Road. It will have two separate concourses, the northern concourse around the current-day Wu King Road Garden, and the southern above the current-day Tuen Mun Public Pier public toilets.

Platforms	Southern; Concourse	Platform 2	Tuen Ma line towards Wu Kai Sha (A16) →
Platforms	Southern; Concourse	Bay platform, doors will open on the left or right
Platforms	Southern; Concourse	Platform 1	Tuen Ma line towards Wu Kai Sha (A16) →
Northern Concourse		Exits

== History ==
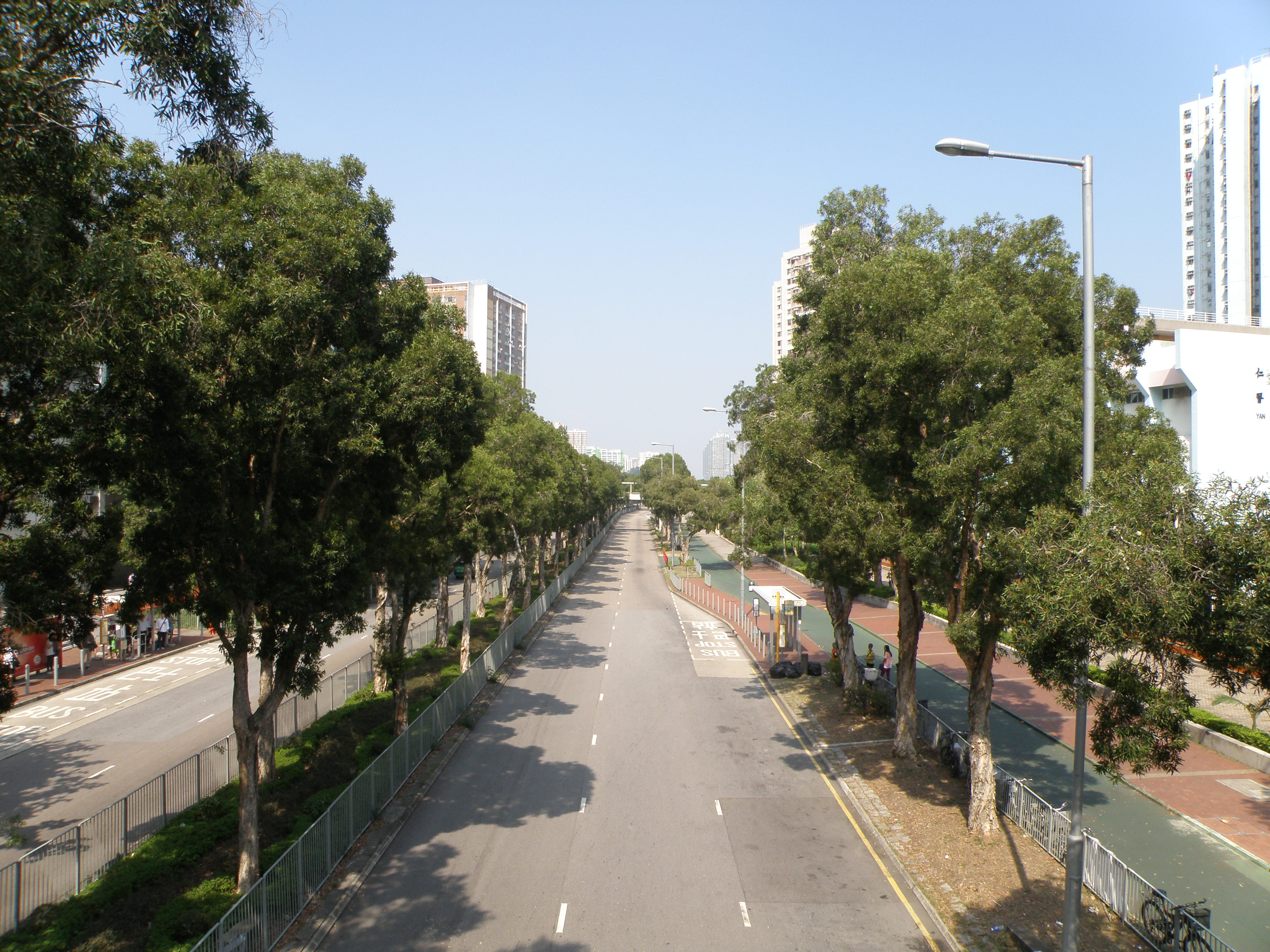
Proposed site of Tuen Mun South station in 2014

The environmental impact assessment was approved in July 2022.
