= MTR SP1900 EMU =

Model of electric multiple unit operated by the MTR

SP1900 EMU (IKK Train) SP1900 / SP1950 / KRS991 / 1151 港鐵近畿川崎列車
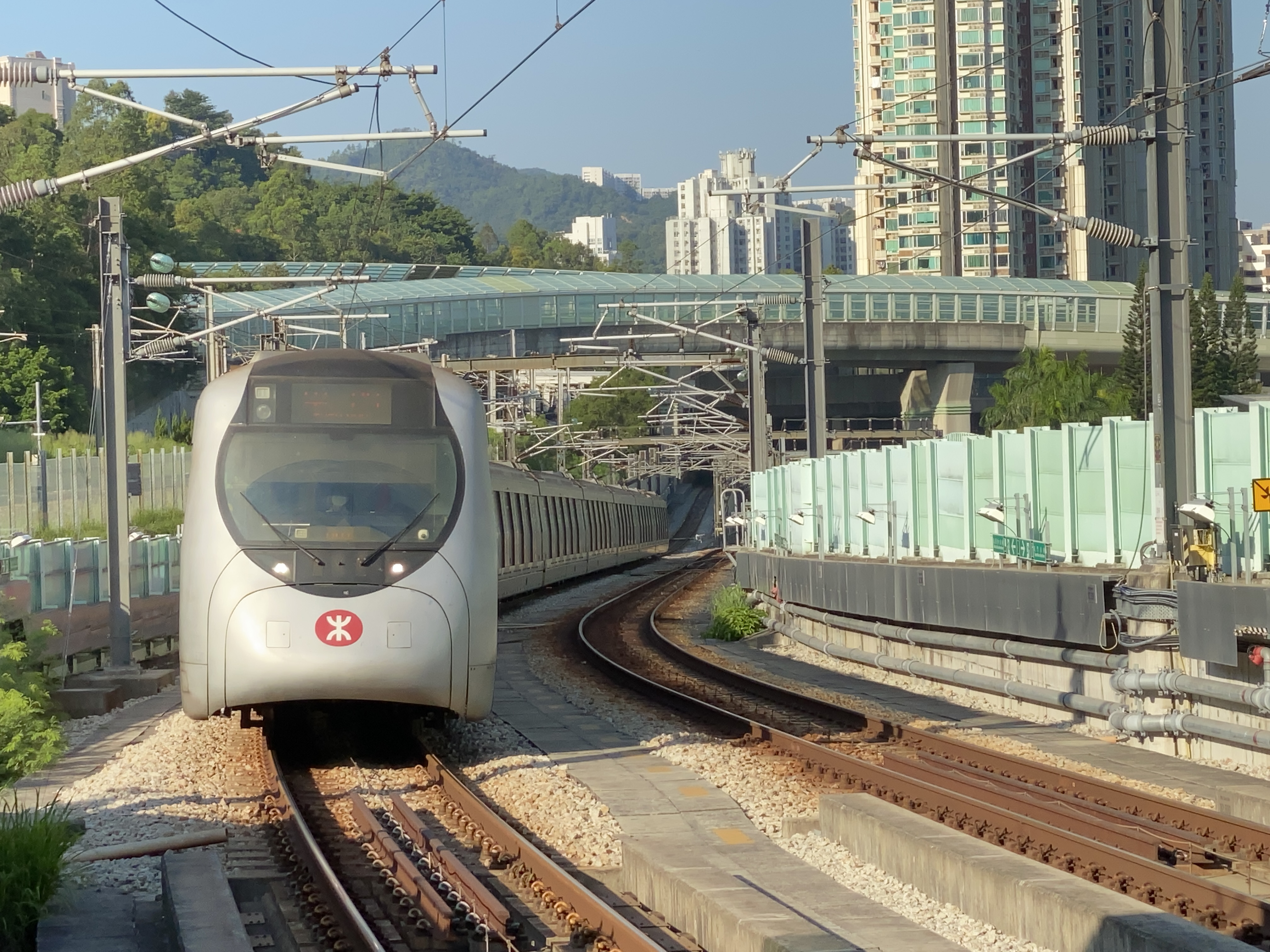
- A MTR Tuen Ma line SP1900 approaching Hin Keng

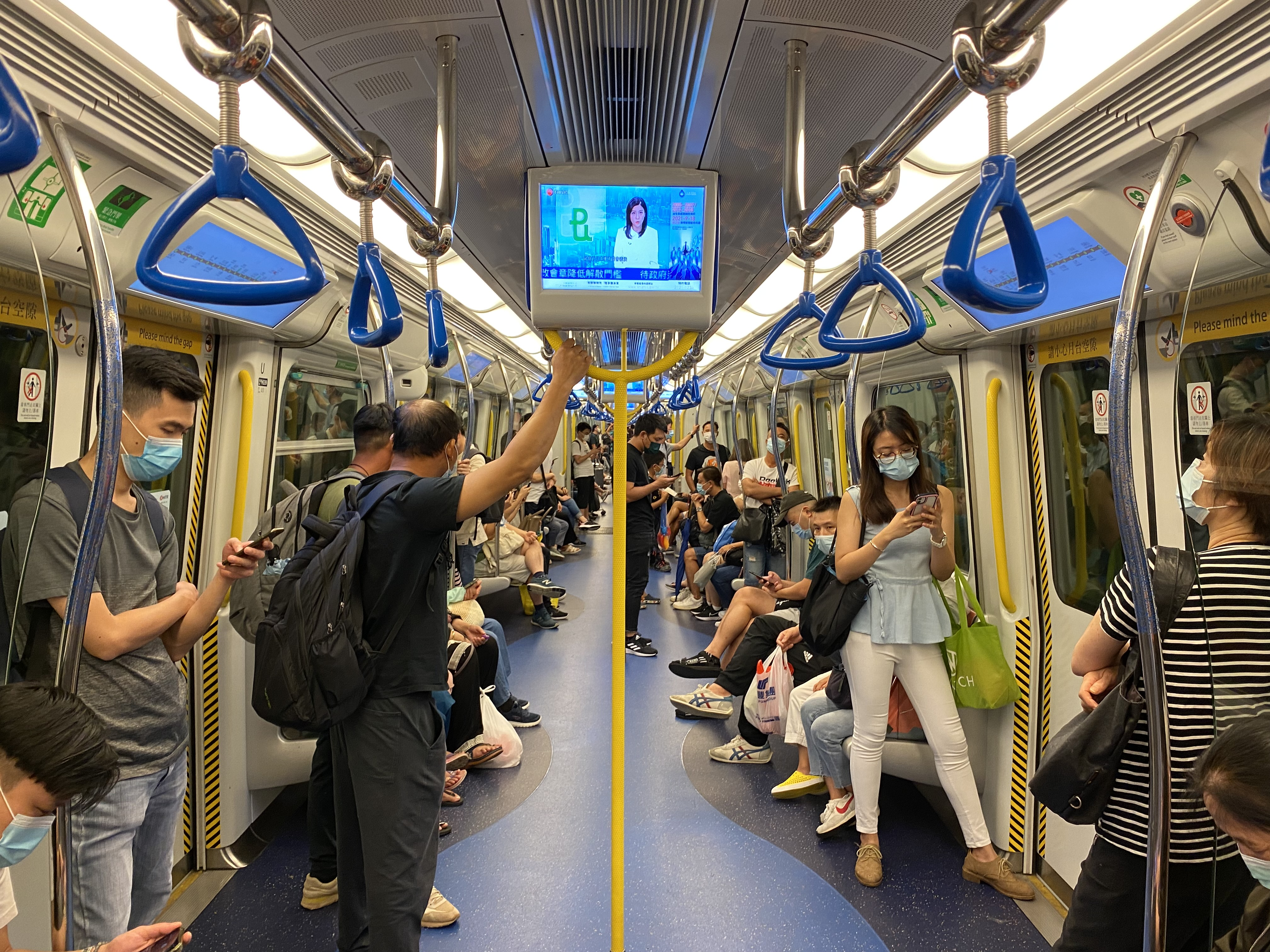
- The interior of a Tuen Ma Line SP1900 EMU
- Stock type: 25kV AC Electric Multiple Unit (EMU)
- In service: 4 September 2001; 25 years ago – present
- Manufacturers: Itochu, Kinki Sharyo & Kawasaki Heavy Industries consortium
- Order no.: SP1900, SP1950, KRS991, 1151
- Built at: Kobe, Hyōgo Prefecture, Japan
- Constructed: 1999–2000 (East Rail line); 2002–2003, 2007 (West Rail line newly-built); 2015–2017 (Refurbished West Rail line sets); 2003-2004 (Ma On Shan line)
- Entered service: 4 September 2001; 25 years ago (East Rail line); 2003, 2008, 2016–2018 (West Rail line after refurbishment); 2004, 2017–2018 (Tuen Ma line after refurbishment)
- Refurbished: 2015–2023
- Number built: 392 cars
- Number in service: 48 sets (384 cars)
- Number retired: 8 cars (driving trailer cars unable to be formed as a complete train)
- Formation: 8 cars per trainset Formerly: 12 cars per trainset (East Rail line); 7 cars per trainset (West Rail line); 4 cars per trainset (Ma On Shan line)
- Fleet numbers: D301-396
- Capacity: C, H, M, P Cars: 452; D Cars: 430; F Cars: 72 (excluding standing capacity) / 216 (with standing capacity)
- Owner: Kowloon-Canton Railway Corporation
- Operators: KCR (2001–2007); MTR (2007–present) (Still owned by the KCR Corporation).
- Depots: Pat Heung, Tai Wai (SP1950 trains only)
- Line served: Current: Tuen Ma line Former: East Rail line 2001 - 2021 West Rail line Ma On Shan line

Specifications
- Car body construction: Stainless steel
- Train length: 195,376 mm (641 ft 0 in) (8-car Tuen Ma line); 291.92 m (957 ft 9 in) (Former 12-car East Rail line); 171.24 m (561 ft 10 in) (Former 7-car West Rail line); 98,832 mm (324 ft 3.0 in) (Former 4-car Ma On Shan line)
- Car length: 25,280 mm (82 ft 11.3 in) (end cars); 24,136 mm (79 ft 2 in) (intermediate cars)
- Width: 3.1 m (10 ft 2.05 in)
- Height: 3.99 m (13 ft 1.09 in) (without roof equipment)
- Floor height: 1.07 m (3 ft 6.1 in) (ever-so-slightly higher than MLR) (Under the Wires to Lo Wu, The Railway Magazine, November 1983)
- Platform height: 1,066.8 mm (3 ft 6.0 in) (Under the Wires to Lo Wu, The Railway Magazine, November 1983)
- Doors: 5 per side (Standard compartments) 2 per side (Former First Class compartments)
- Maximum speed: 160 km/h (99 mph) (design); 130 km/h (81 mph) (service)
- Weight: 37 t (36.4 long tons; 40.8 short tons)
- Traction system: Mitsubishi Electric MAP-242-A25V93/93A 2-level IGBT–VVVF
- Traction motors: 16 × Mitsubishi MB-5084-A/A2 240 kW (321.8 hp) 3-phase AC induction motor
- Power output: 3.84 MW (5,149.5 hp)
- Acceleration: 1 m/s^{2} (3.3 ft/s^{2})
- Deceleration: 1 m/s^{2} (3.3 ft/s^{2}) (service); 1.35 m/s^{2} (4.4 ft/s^{2}) (emergency)
- Power supply: Mitsubishi Electric ATM5 Transformer, 2610 KVA Capacity, PWM 2-Level control, forced air cooling system
- Electric system: 25 kV 50 Hz AC overhead catenary
- Current collection: Pantograph
- UIC classification: 2′2′+Bo′Bo′+Bo′Bo′+2′2′+2′2′+Bo′Bo′+Bo′Bo′+2′2′ (8-car Tuen Ma line); 2′2′+Bo′Bo′+Bo′Bo′+2′2′+2′2′+2′2′+Bo′Bo′+Bo′Bo′+2′2′+Bo′Bo′+Bo′Bo′+2′2′ (Former 12-car East Rail line); 2′2′+Bo′Bo′+Bo′Bo′+2′2′+Bo′Bo′+Bo′Bo′+2′2′ (Former 7-car West Rail line); 2′2′+Bo′Bo′+Bo′Bo′+2′2′ (Former 4-car Ma On Shan line)
- Bogies: KD312 / KW165 (powered), KD312A / KW166 (trailer)
- Braking systems: Knorr-Bremse electropneumatic and regenerative
- Safety system: SelTrac
- Coupling system: Tightlock
- Seating: Longitudinal
- Track gauge: 1,435 mm (4 ft 8 1/2 in) standard gauge

Notes/references
- Door centres: 3,800 mm (12 ft 5.606 in); Door width: 1,400 mm (4 ft 7.118 in)

The SP1900 EMU / SP1950 EMU or IKK Train (formerly KCR EMU SP1900 / SP1950 EMU; 港鐵近畿川崎列車, also known as the Millennium Train during the public promotion) is a model of train that runs on Hong Kong's Tuen Ma line. It was the second model of electric multiple unit rolling stock of the Kowloon-Canton Railway Corporation (KCRC) (after the Metro Cammell EMU, introduced in the 1980s), though they have been operated by MTR Corporation (MTRC) after it merged with KCRC in 2007.

The trains were delivered in several phases. The phases have different model numbers but an identical appearance. The models numbers include: SP1900, SP1950, KRS991 and 1151. Unless specified, the name SP1900 would apply to describe all the model numbers in this article. Another model, 1141A (MTR CRRC Changchun EMU), is similar in design to the SP1900, but was built by a different manufacturer and has a slightly different appearance. After the 2007 rail merger, the KCR logos on the SP1900 trains were replaced with those of MTR, and a revised route map was introduced in the train interiors.

== History ==
On 8 March 1999, a Japanese consortium comprising Itochu, Kinki Sharyo and Kawasaki Heavy Industries (collectively named IKK) won a HK$3.1-billion contract to build a new model of commuter train for the Kowloon–Canton Railway (KCR). The contract code of these trains is SP1900.

The SP1900 trains started service on the KCR East Rail (now East Rail line) in 2001; the first train cars were delivered on 22 March 2001, and the first train entered operation on 4 September 2001. Of the 250 cars ordered, 96 cars were assigned to the East Rail line and arranged into eight trainsets of 12 cars each, which operated alongside the existing Metro Cammell EMUs. The remaining 154 cars, which began to be delivered in 2002, were reserved until the inauguration of the KCR West Rail in December 2003, and were arranged in 22 sets of seven-car formations.

In December 2000, KCRC reordered 72 cars of the same model, with different contract code, SP1950, prepared for the inauguration of Ma On Shan Rail in December 2004, totalling 18 sets in four-car configuration.

In January 2006, another contract KRS991 was signed by the KCRC, ordering an additional 34 compartments of the same model, in preparation for the Kowloon Southern Link, which was opened in 2009. Twenty-eight of them were formed into four seven-car trains, and the remaining six compartments joined eight existing ones from two trains on the Ma On Shan line to form another two seven-car trains. The new trains arrived from October 2007 and served the West Rail line.

=== Conversion ===
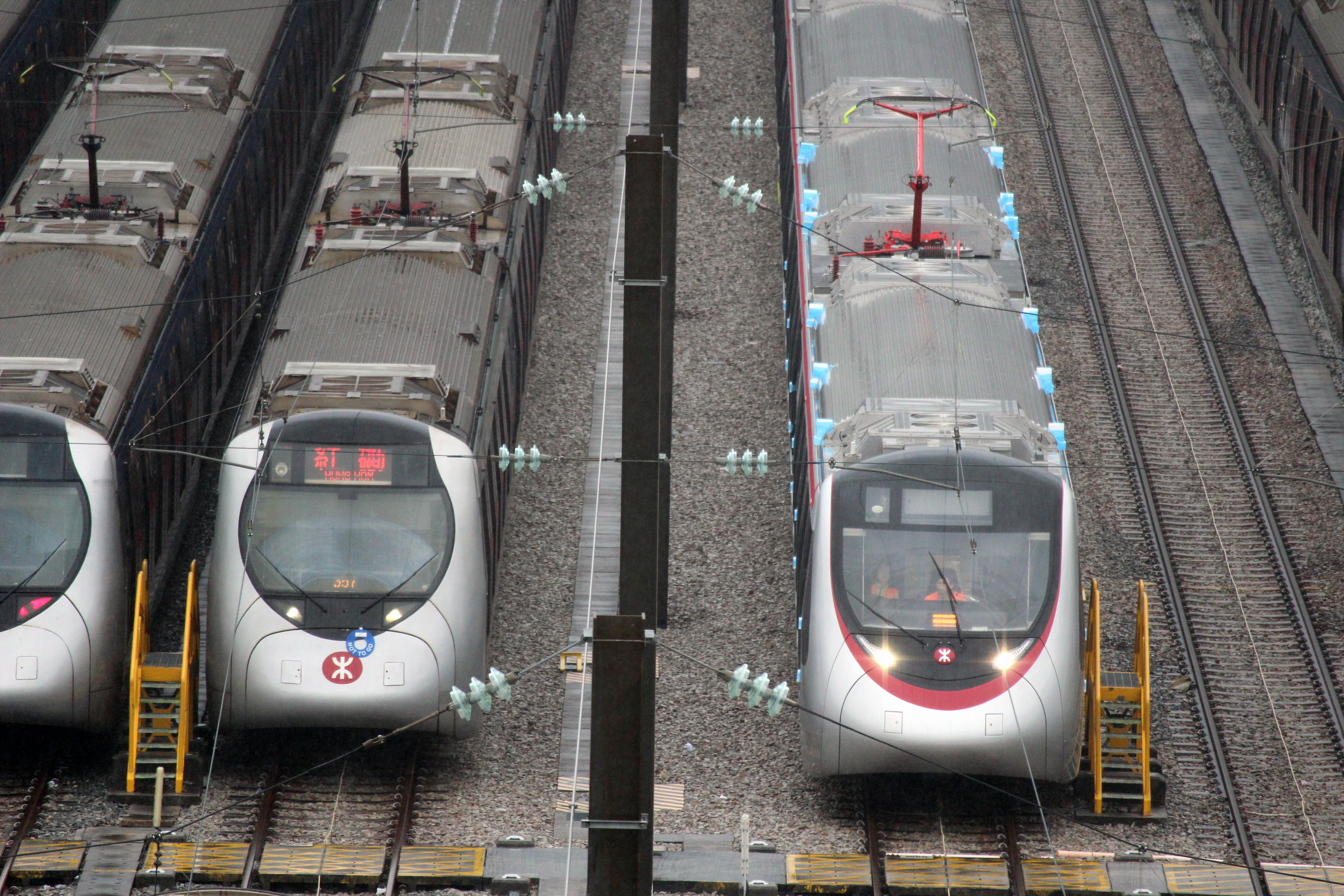
SP1900 seen on the left together with the TML C-Train on the right, showing the differences between the cab end designs

On 24 January 2014, the MTRC, now operating the West Rail line on KCRC's behalf, ordered another 36 new cars (under contract number 1151) to convert the SP1900 sets on all three lines to 8-car configurations for the future Tuen Ma line (previously known as the East West Corridor). The newly converted SP1900 trains are also retrofitted with dynamic route map displays to replace the plastic map stickers above the doorways, and received larger 22-inch (559 mm) LCD TVs. They retain the KCR livery with blue bodies and red doors. Until the full opening of the Tuen Ma line in 2021, the converted trains continued to serve separately on the West Rail and Ma On Shan lines, but would be withdrawn from the East Rail line and be replaced with new Hyundai Rotem EMUs.

A separate order was also made for 136 carriages from Changchun Railway Vehicles to form several new 8-car sets for the East West Corridor, operating alongside the SP1900 sets. Unlike the IKK trains, these new trains (under contract number 1141A) have the same livery as the SIL C-Trains and R-Trains on the North South Corridor, and are essentially facelifted versions of the SP1900 design, with major differences being the cab ends and electrical equipment. These trains are called the TML C-Train and entered service on the Ma On Shan line on 12 March 2017.

The SP1900 EMUs were eventually withdrawn from East Rail line service on 6 February 2021, when the Trainguard MT system was adopted on the line. Apart from 8 carriages that will be removed from revenue service for good due to severe structural cracks on the roof, all other former East Rail line units will undergo conversion works for use on the Tuen Ma line.

== Design and capacity ==
The SP1900 trains feature a completely different appearance from the now-retired Metro-Cammell EMU on the East Rail line. Most notably, the "head" car, D car, presents a slight bullet train-shaped head for better acceleration against air drag at high speeds. Its exterior livery is almost identical to the older trains following refurbishment, as well as all newer equipment, with five sliding doors on each side of the standard compartment. Before conversion, there were two doors on each side of the first class compartment, of which one is normally unused.

The interior of SP1900 is yellowish with blue flooring, with fully longitudinal seating akin to the M-Trains on the urban lines and a wider gangway connection than the refurbished Metro Cammell EMUs. Each car has six 22-inch (559 mm) (originally 15-inch (381 mm)) LCD monitors mounted on stanchions and broadcasting looping daily TV news provided by Cable TV Hong Kong (Newsline Express), advertisements and safety guidelines when announcements are being broadcast. Two small video cameras are mounted in opposite positions on each car for the drive to keep the train under surveillance.

Whereas manufacturer Kinki Sharyo listed capacity (standing and seating) upward of 430 for D-cars and 452 for others, as well as 72 seats for first-class carriages, MTR's corporate publications specifies that car capacities in the three lines as "52 seated and up to 286 standing", with first-class compartment allowing "72 seated and up to 144 standing".

In 2007, KCRC introduced customized "Art Unlimited" exterior wraps on one East Rail set and one West Rail set, featuring pro-modern plane art exhibitions dedicated by public volunteers on both the exterior and interior of the train compartments. The wraps were removed right before the operator's merger with MTRC by the end of that year.

Signalling variance on the individual lines resulted in trains on the East Rail line being installed with TBL (enhanced with ATP). Trains on the other two routes has been installed with SelTrac (ATO / ATP). The control and monitor panel inside the driver cab is different between the two controlling systems, in spite of the fact that they're mounted on the same model of train.

The electrification system used on the Tuen Ma line and East Rail line is 25 kV 50 Hz AC, as opposed to the 1,500 V DC used on the urban lines. Should the need arise in the future, dual voltage trains such as those used on Oresund Bridge would be required.

== Train configurations ==
Cars of SP1900 / SP1950 train
car type	driving cab	hostler	motor	pantograph	length (mm)	seats	standing capacity	total
car type	driving cab	hostler	motor	pantograph	length (mm)	seats	standing capacity	WR	TM1	Spare
D car	✓	✗	✗	✗	24820	48	382	66	10	20
P car	✗	✗	✓	✓	23216	50	402	66	10	20
M car	✗	✗	✓	✗	23216	50/52	400/402	66	10	20
H car	✗	✓	✗	✗	23216	50/52	400/402	33	5	10
C car	✗	✗	✗	✗	23216	50	402	33	5	10

The current configuration of SP1900/SP1950/C1151 trains in revenue service is (Wu Kai Sha bound) D-P-M-H-C-M-P-D (Tuen Mun bound). Formerly, there were three different configurations. On the East Rail line, an SP1900 train in revenue service had a configuration of (southbound) D-P-M-H-C-H-M-P-F-M-P-D (northbound). For West Rail line, an SP1900/SP1950 train had a configuration of (southbound) D-P-M-C-M-P-D (northbound). On Ma On Shan line, an SP1950 train had a configuration of (westbound) D-P-M-D (eastbound). Quiet cars are on all D cars (cars 1 and 8, 8-car trains only). Formerly, there were different arrangements for each line: on the East Rail line the quiet cars are cars 1, 4, 11 (southbound) and cars 2, 9, 12 (northbound). For West Rail line, quiet cars are cars 1, 4 (southbound), cars 4, 7 (northbound). For 4-car trains on Ma On Shan line, all M cars (car 2, eastbound or car 3, westbound) are quiet cars. The English letter prefix indicates the type of car.

== Major incidents ==
At 09:15 on 14 February 2007, a West Rail SP1900 passenger train (D305/306) broke down when one of the transformers (numbered P306) mounted on the train roof exploded. It is suspected that the overheated transformer caused its insulating oil to vaporise, thus causing the explosion. In addition, the circuit breaker of the transformer apparently failed to cut the power supply to the transformer.

The scene was in the Tai Lam Tunnel southbound track, about 2 km (1.2 mi) from Tsuen Wan West station. Around 650 passengers had to evacuate through the dark tunnel to the station, and around 340 people returned to the ground through a ventilation shaft at Chai Wan Kok. 11 passengers were sent to the hospital. Train services returned to normal after four hours.

As a gesture of apology, Mr Michael Tien, the KCRC chairman, announced that the West Rail would be opened for free rides on 9am to 1pm at 21 February 2007, the first working day after the Chinese New Year holiday.

== Gallery ==
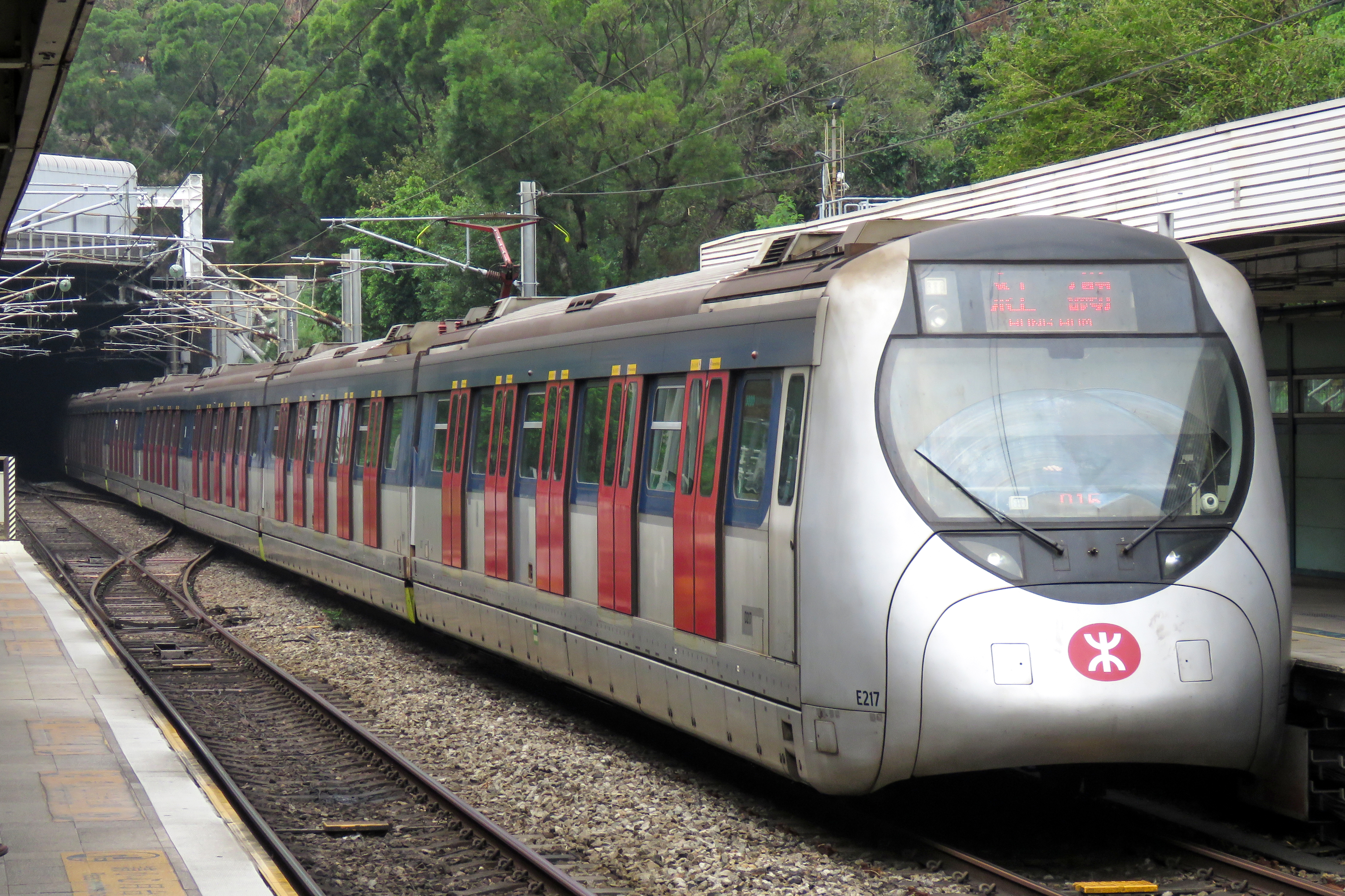
Refurbished SP1900 train E217 on the East Rail line at Kowloon Tong station

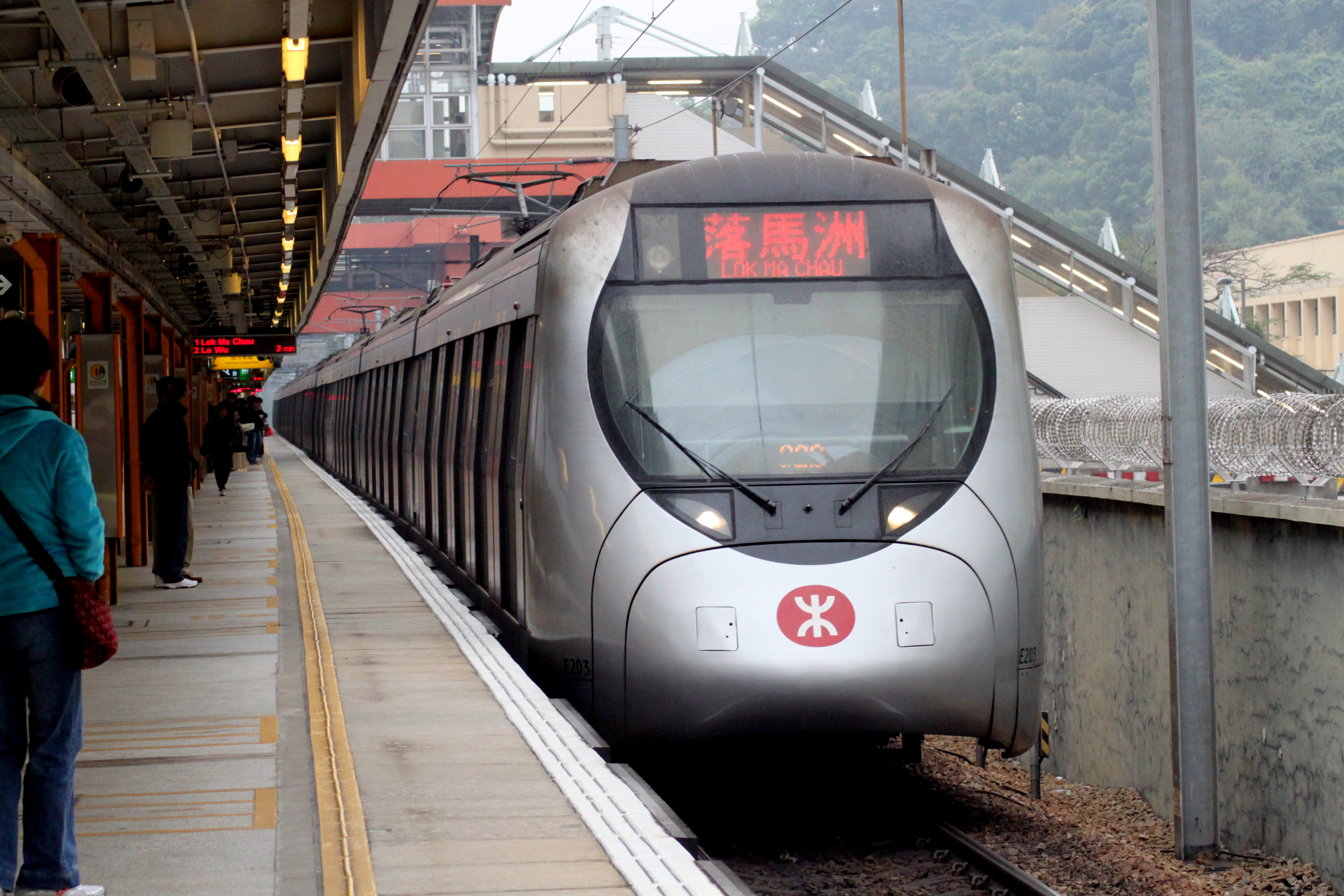
Un-refurbished SP1900 on the East Rail line at Fo Tan station

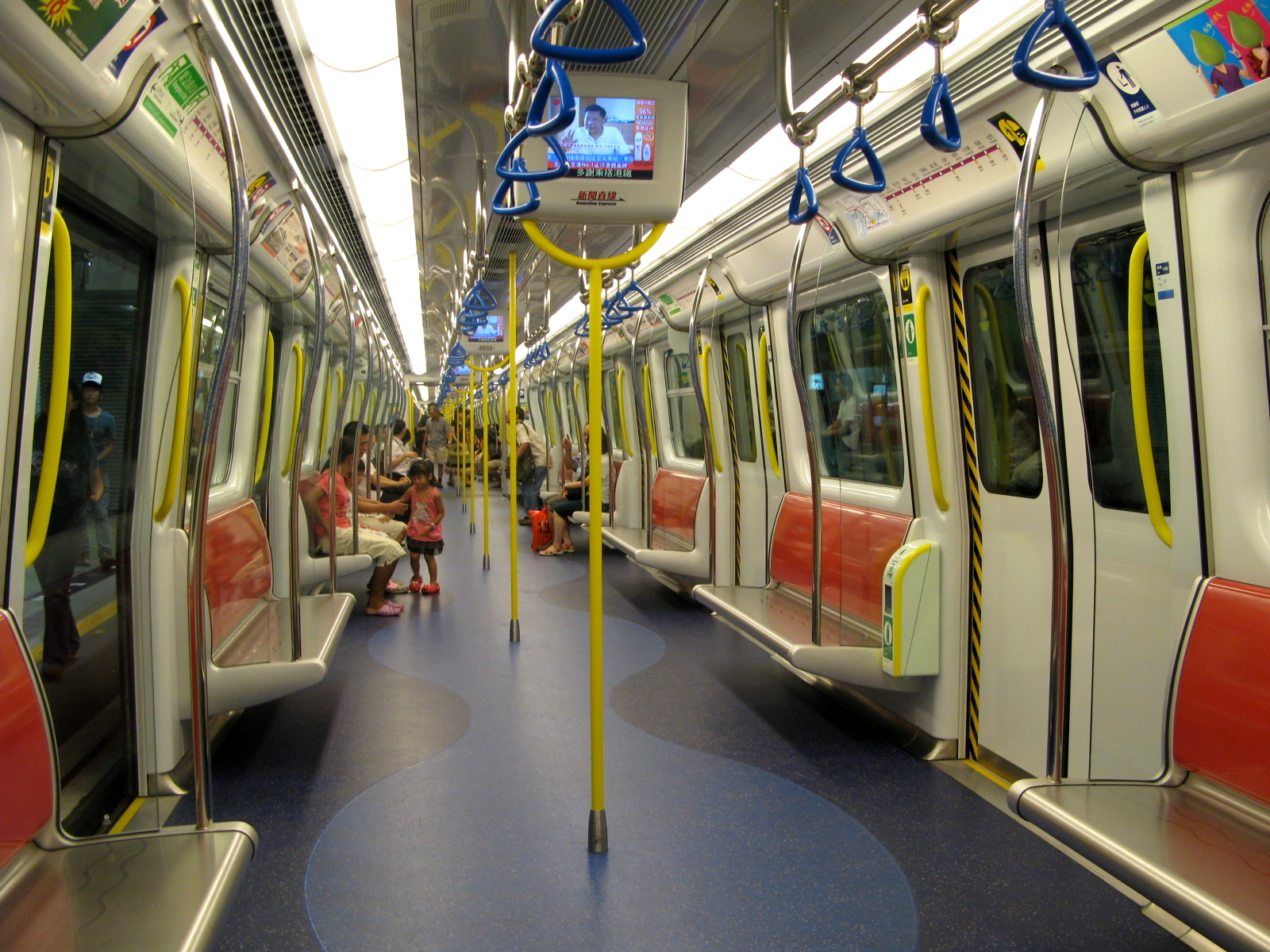
The interior of an un-refurbished West Rail line SP1900 EMU

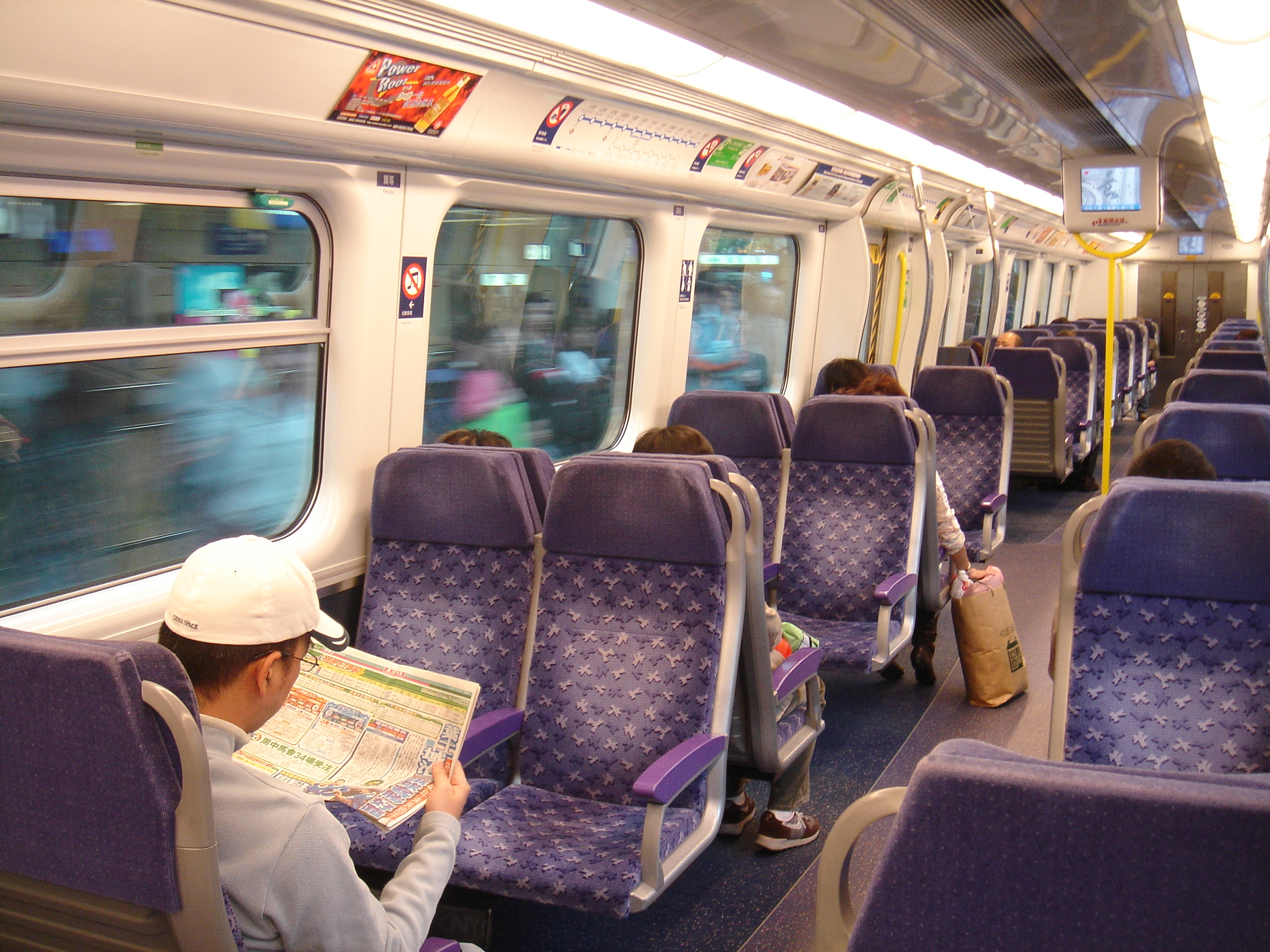
First class compartment of an un-refurbished SP1900

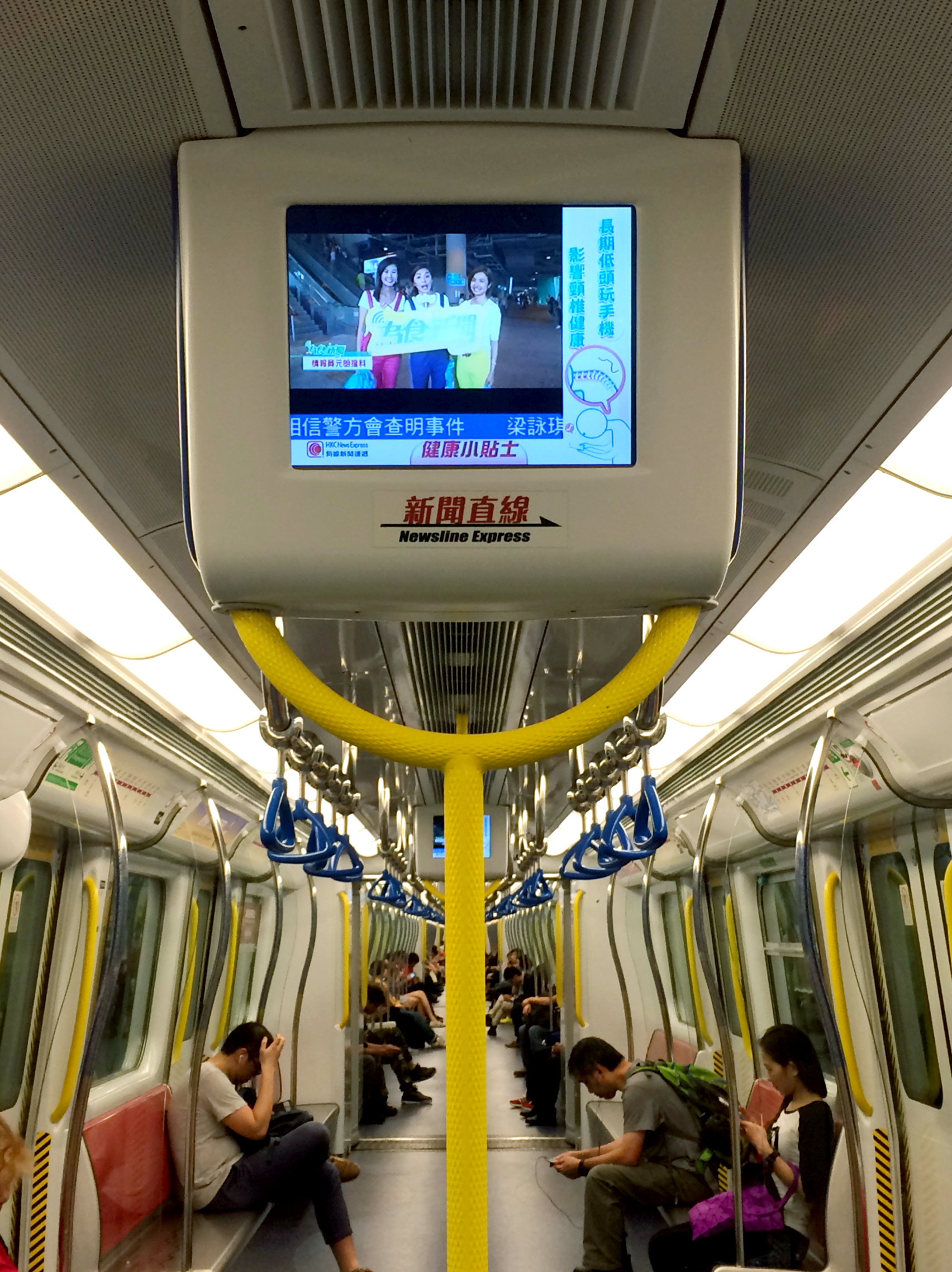
Original Newsline Express 15-inch TV on an un-refurbished SP1900

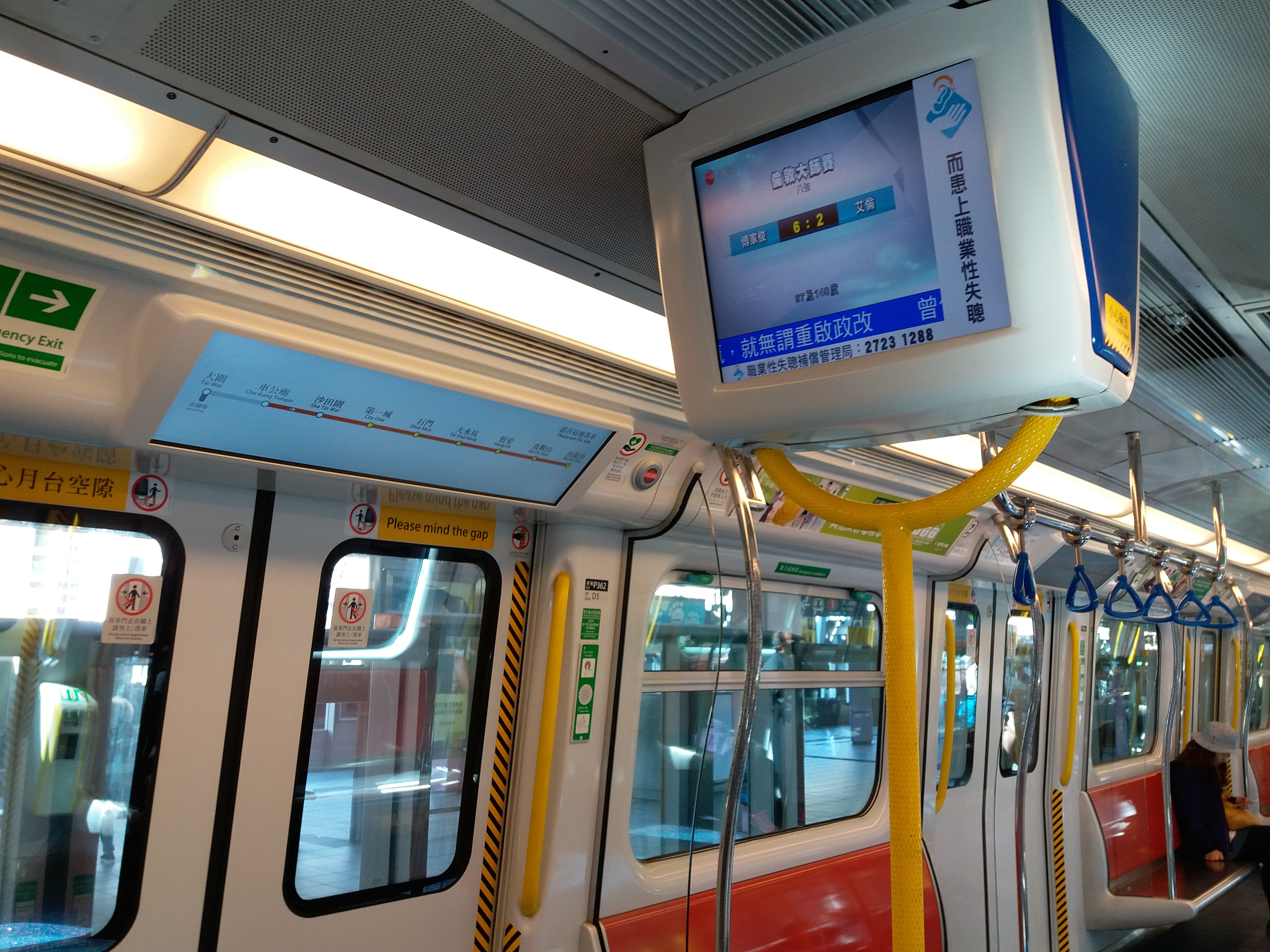
New LCD displays and 22-inch TVs on a refurbished Ma On Shan line SP1900

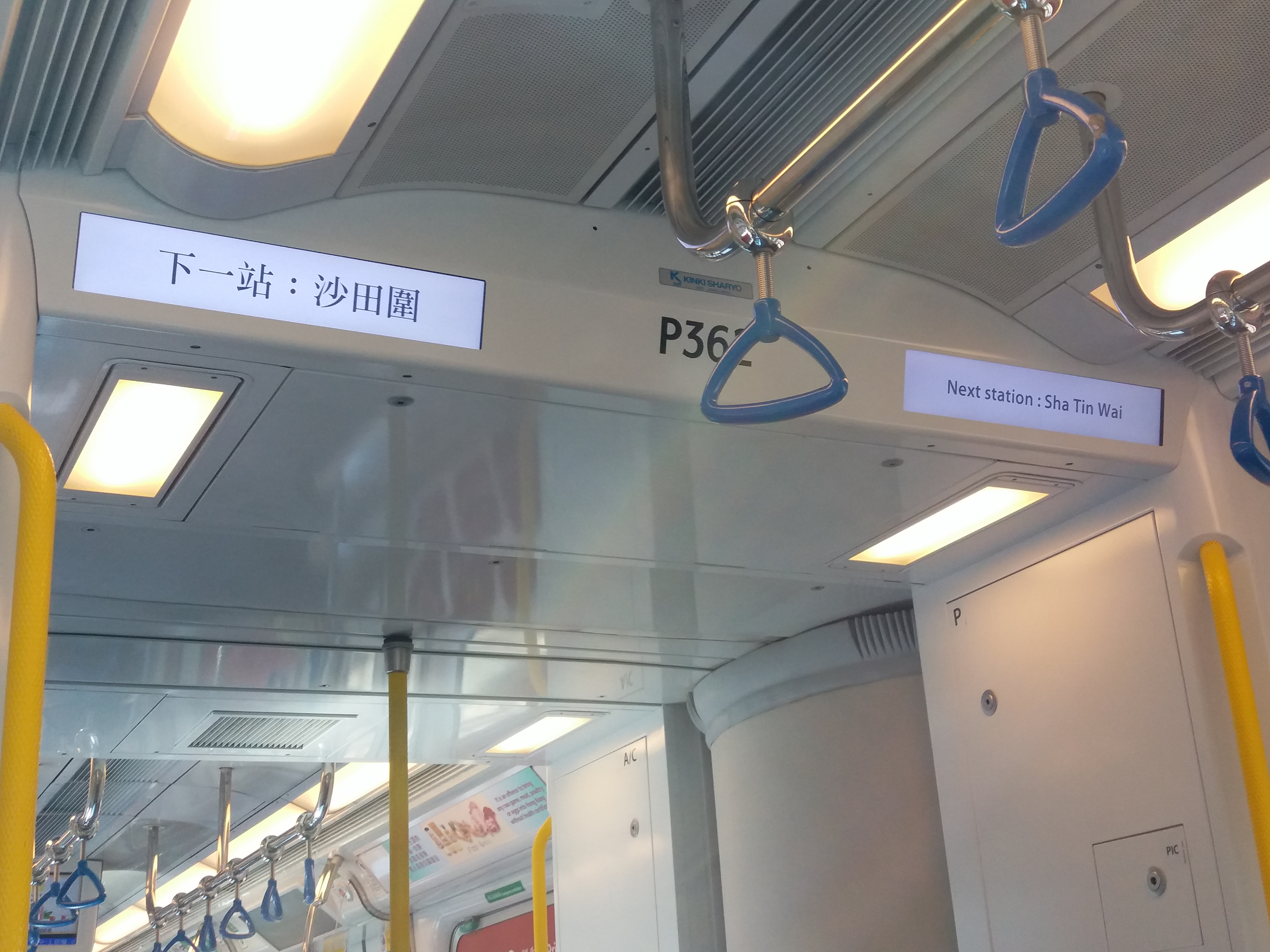
New aisle displays on a refurbished Ma On Shan line SP1900

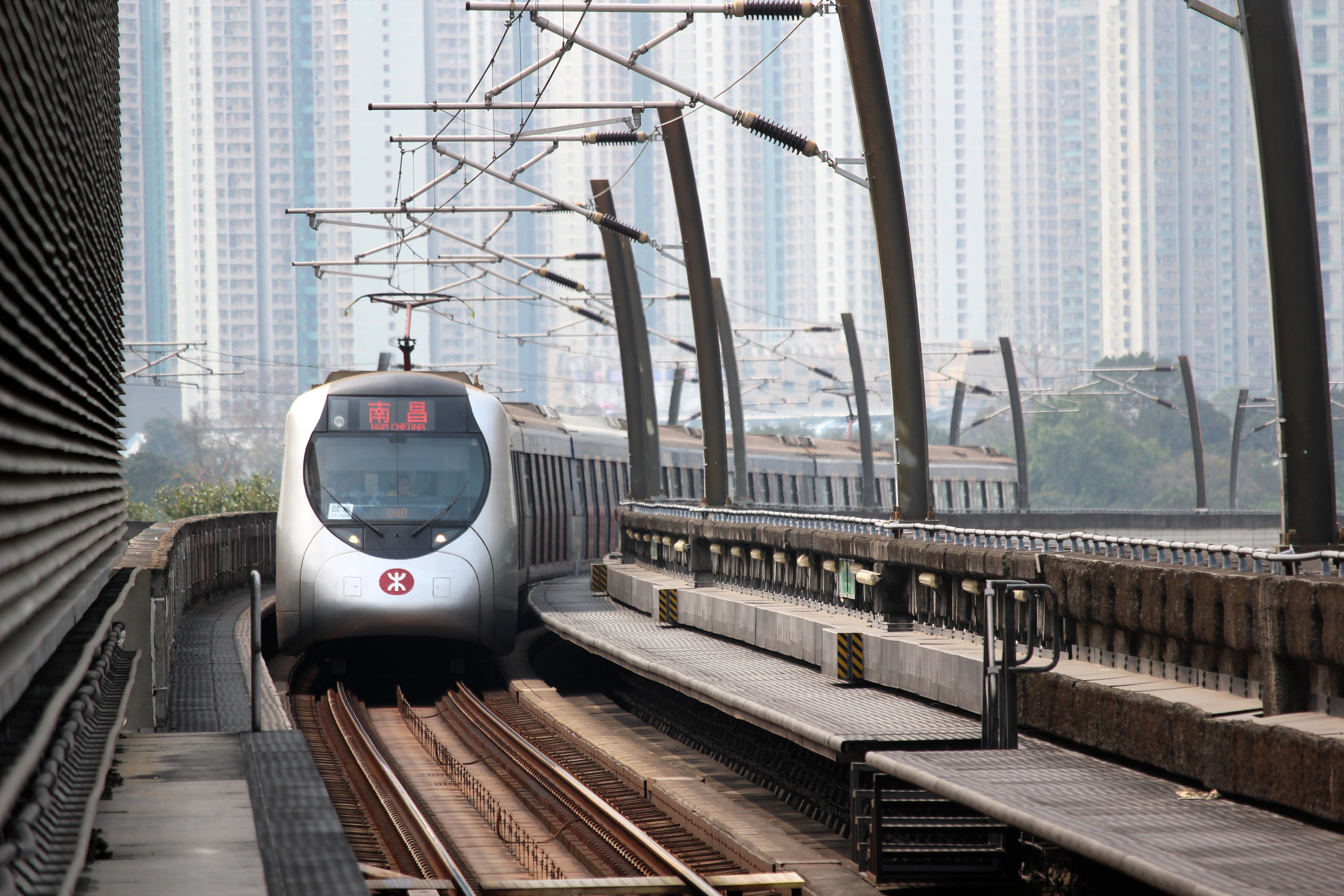
8-car West Rail line SP1900 testing in Long Ping station

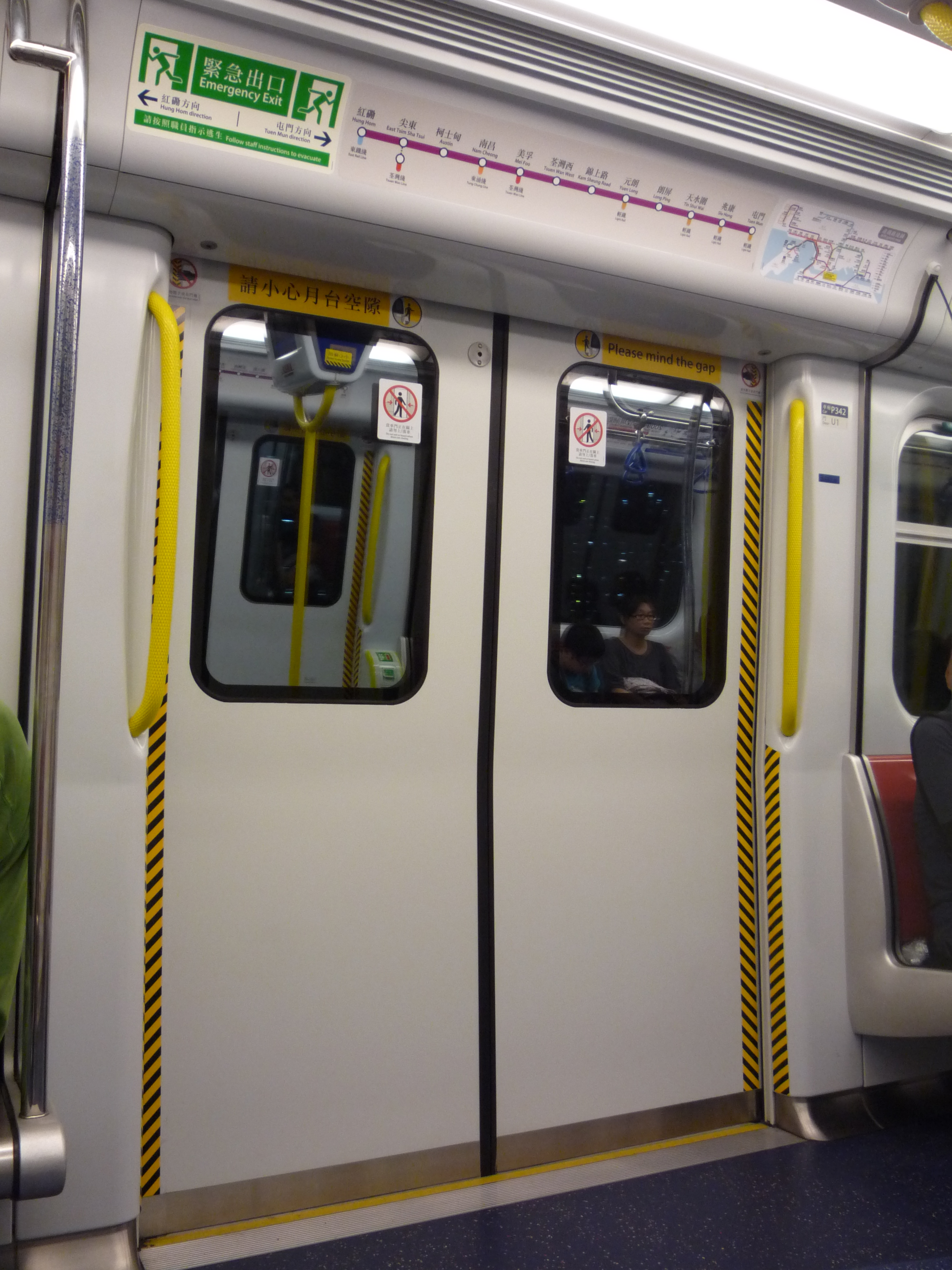
Train doors of an un-refurbished West Rail line SP1900

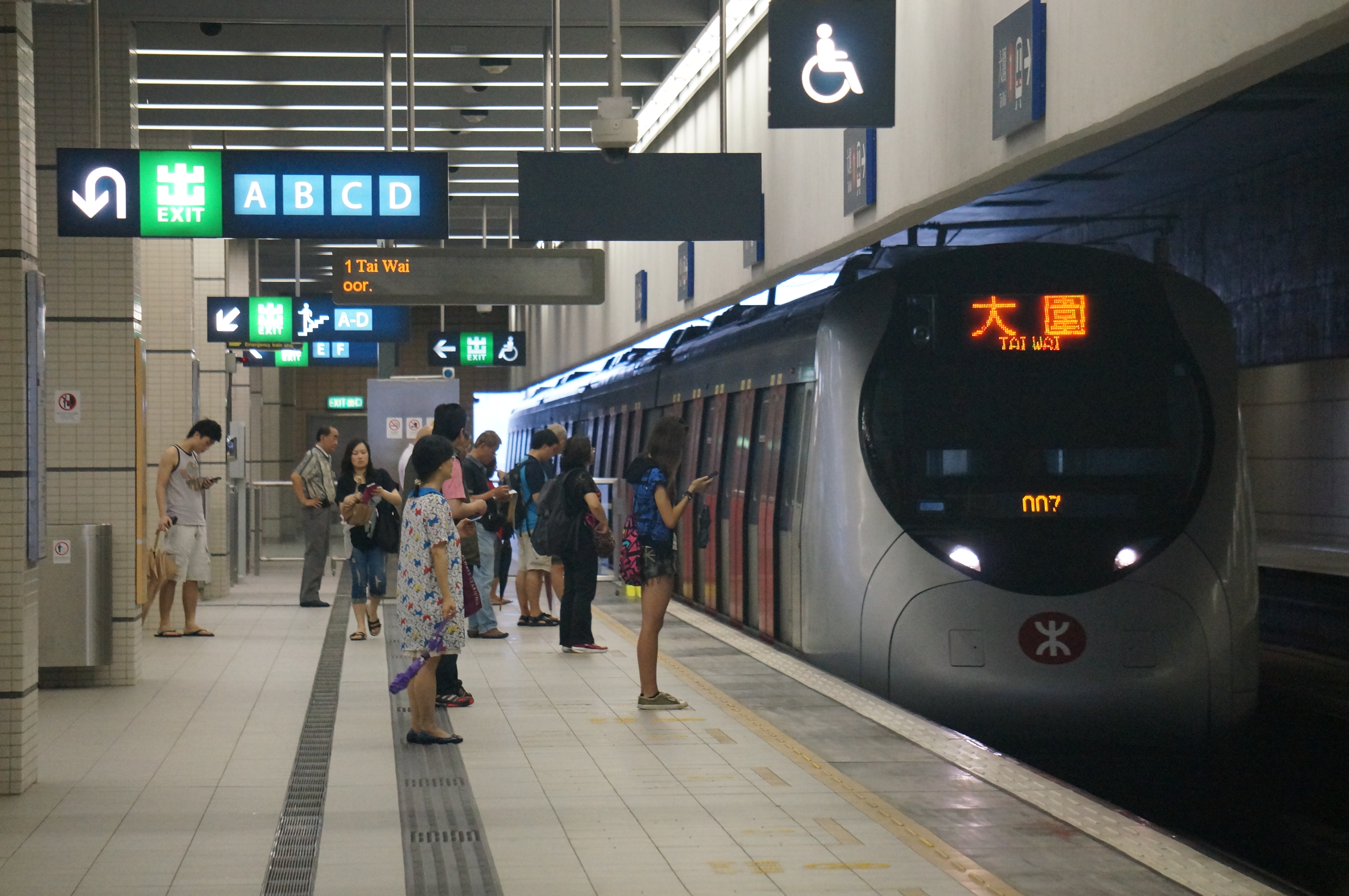
Un-refurbished Ma On Shan line SP1950 at Che Kung Temple Station

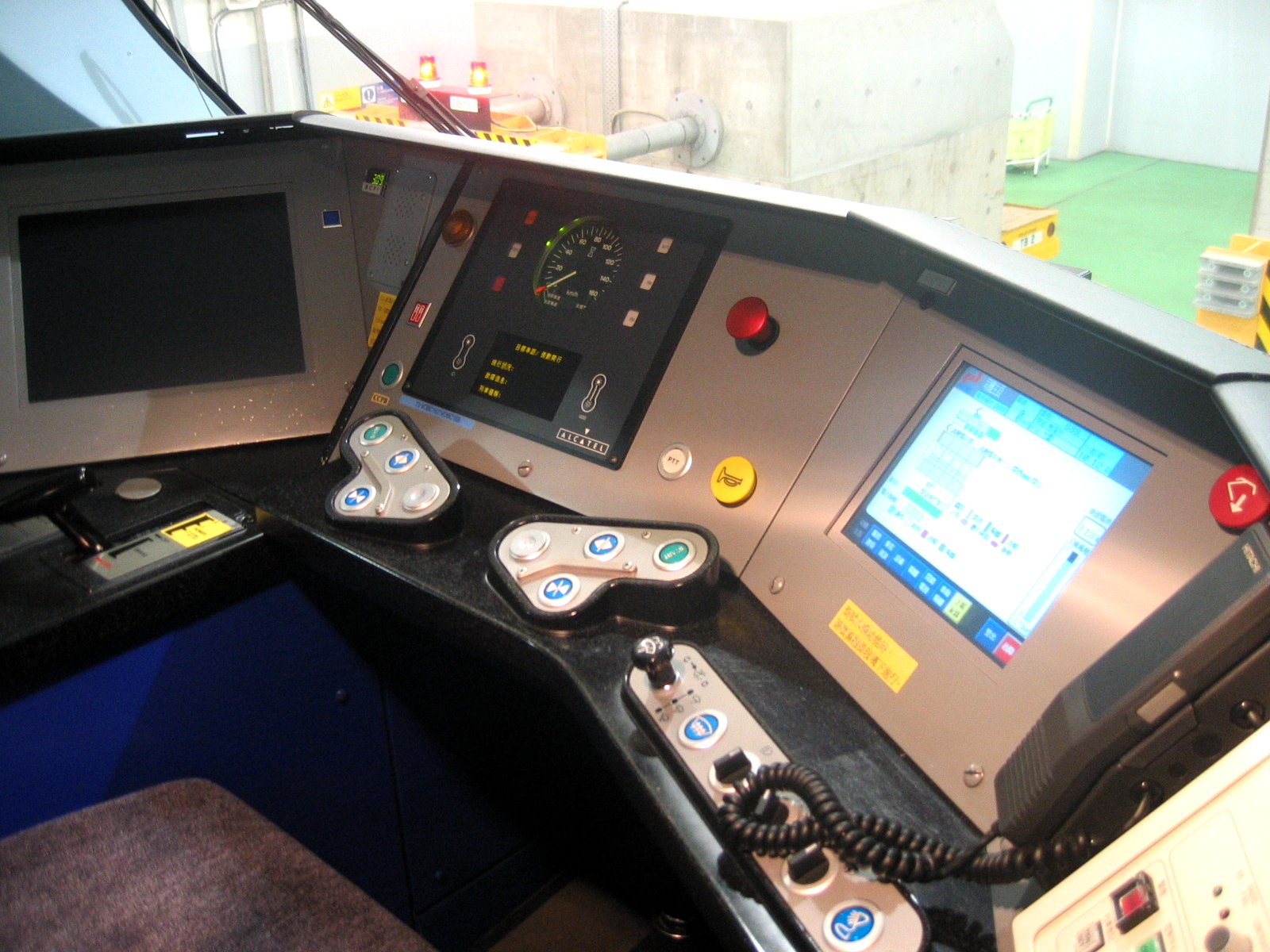
Driver control panel of Ma On Shan line SP1950

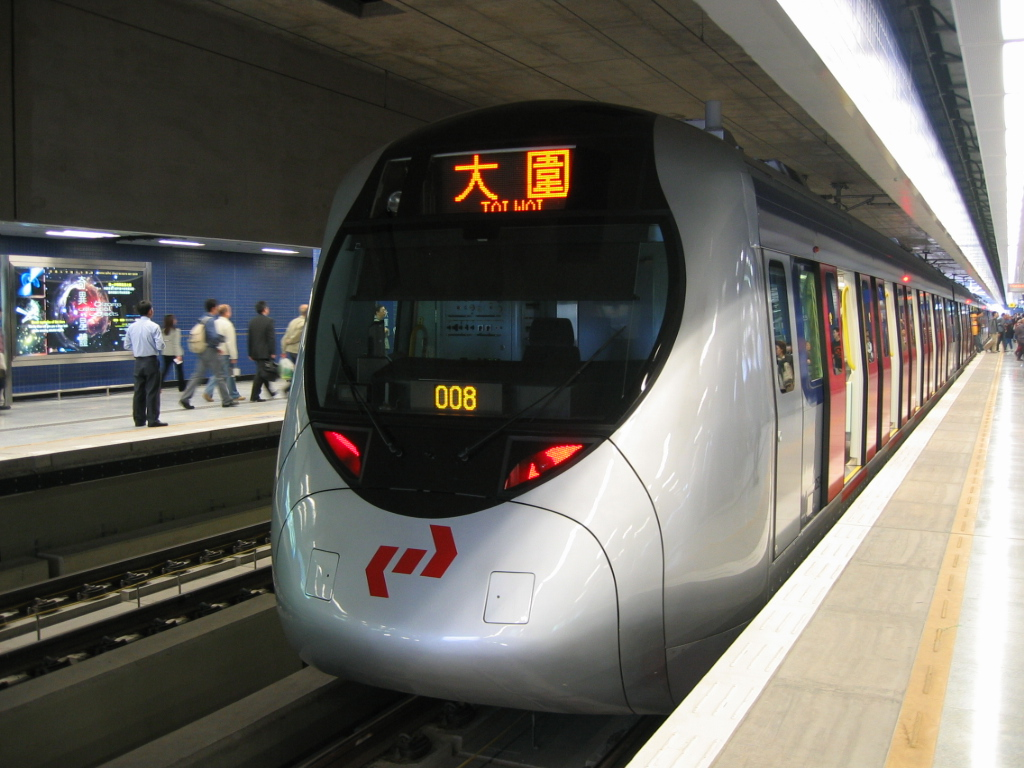
KCR SP1900 EMU at Tai Wai station

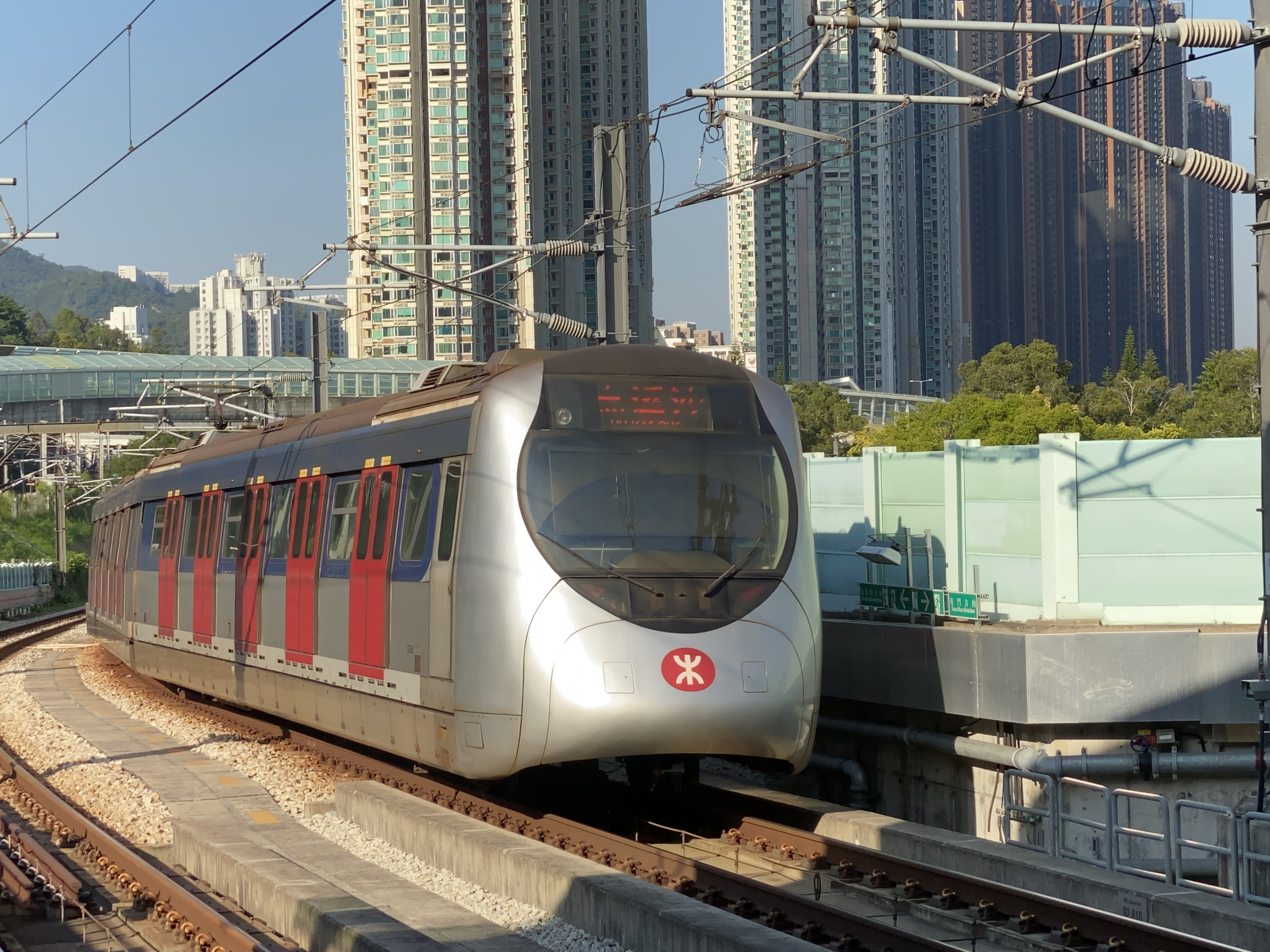
Tuen Ma line SP1900 leaving Hin Keng

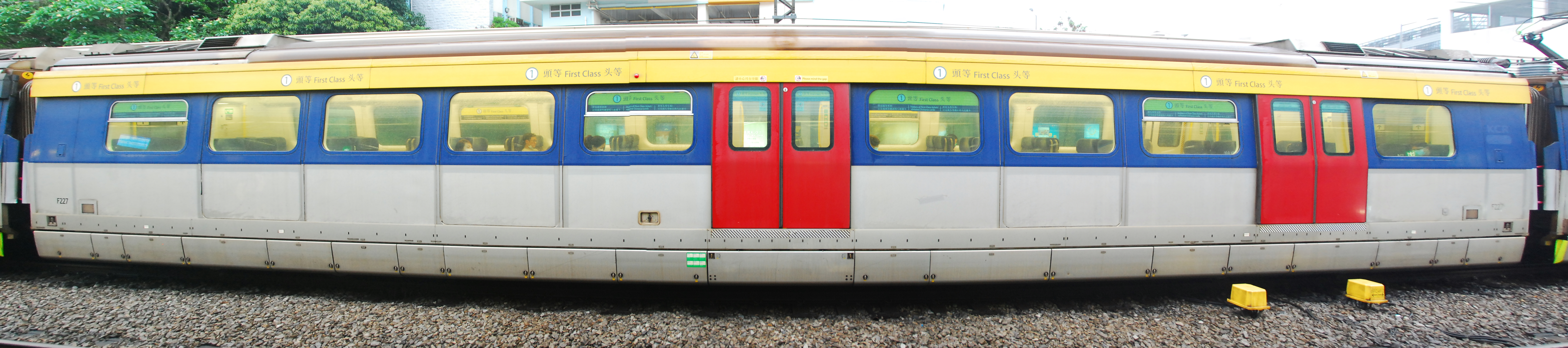
Compartment F227 - Side (upward left side) (first class compartment)
