= Tai Lam Tunnel (Tuen Ma line) =

Hong Kong railway tunnel

Coordinates: 22.3965°N 114.0612°E

The Tai Lam Tunnel (Chinese: 大欖隧道) on the MTR Tuen Ma line, at 5.5 kilometres (3.4 mi), was previously the longest transport tunnel in Hong Kong. It was completed in 2003. The tunnel was built by a joint venture between Nishimatsu and Dragages. To its southeast are the Tsing Tsuen Tunnels and to its northeast is the Pat Heung Depot. Further northwest are Kam Sheung Road station and the Kam Sheung Road–Tuen Mun Viaduct.

== Major incidents ==
The Tai Lam Tunnel was the location of a major explosion on 14 February 2007. At 09:15 am, a West Rail SP1900 passenger train (D305/306) broke down when one of the transformers (numbered P306) mounted on the train roof exploded. It is suspected that the overheated transformer caused its insulating oil to vaporise, thus causing the explosion. In addition, the circuit breaker of the transformer apparently failed to cut the power supply to the transformer.

The scene was in the tunnel's southbound track, about 2 km (1.2 mi) from Tsuen Wan West station. Around 650 passengers had to evacuate through the dark tunnel to the station, and around 340 people returned to the ground through a ventilation shaft at Chai Wan Kok. 11 passengers were sent to the hospital. Train services returned to normal after four hours.

As a gesture of apology, Mr Michael Tien, the KCRC chairman, announced that the West Rail would be opened for free rides on 9am to 1pm at February 21, 2007, the first working day after the Lunar New Year holiday.
