= Hoi Wong Road stop =

Light rail stop in Tuen Mun, Hong Kong

Coordinates: 22°22′52″N 113°58′14″E

Hoi Wong Road 海皇路
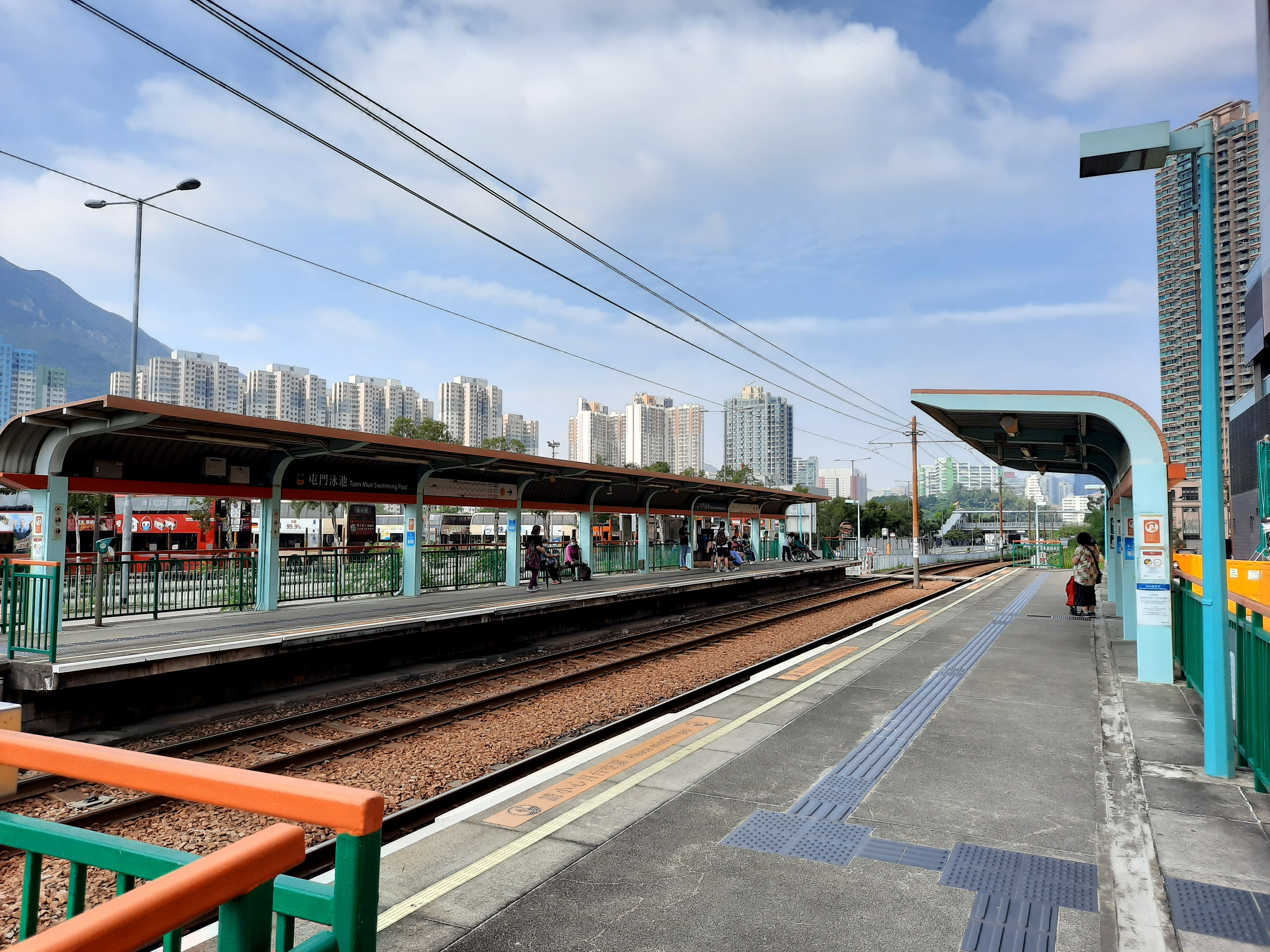
- The platform before renaming

General information
- Location: Area 16; Tuen Mun; Hong Kong
- System: MTR Light Rail stop
- Owner: KCR Corporation
- Operator: MTR Corporation Limited
- Line: 507 614 614P
- Platforms: 2 side platforms
- Tracks: 2
- Connections: Bus, minibus

Construction
- Structure type: At-grade
- Accessible: yes

Other information
- Station code: HWR (English code); 250 (Digital code)
- Fare zone: 1

History
- Opened: 17 November 1991; 34 years ago
- Former names: Tuen Mun Swimming Pool (until 2026)

Services
Preceding stop	MTR Light Rail	Following stop
Goodview Garden towards Tin King	507	Siu Hei towards Tuen Mun Ferry Pier
Siu Hei towards Tuen Mun Ferry Pier	614	Goodview Garden towards Yuen Long
Siu Hei towards Tuen Mun Ferry Pier	614P	Goodview Garden towards Siu Hong
Location
- Location within MTR

Hoi Wong Road (Chinese: 海皇路) is an MTR Light Rail stop located at ground level at the junction of Hoi Wong Road and Hoi Wing Road, next to KMB Tuen Mun South Depot and to the southeast of Tuen Mun Swimming Pool, an aquatics centre in Area 16 of Tuen Mun.

It began service on 17 November 1991 and belongs to Zone 1. It previously served the Tuen Mun Swimming Pool. A railway station, currently A16 station, has been proposed to be built as part of the Tuen Mun South extension of the Tuen Ma line.

The previous name of Tuen Mun Swimming Pool stop was taken from the Tuen Mun Swimming Pool, which was located near the station at the time. However, the pool had to be demolished due to the Tuen Mun South extension project, and the MTR Corporation rebuilt a new pool at the Tuen Mun Recreation and Sports Centre on Lung Mun Road.

In February 2026, the MTR Corporation announced that Tuen Mun Swimming Pool stop would be renamed "Hoi Wong Road stop" (海皇路站) on 5 July 2026.
