= MTR–KCR merger =

Merger of operations between two Hong Kong railway companies

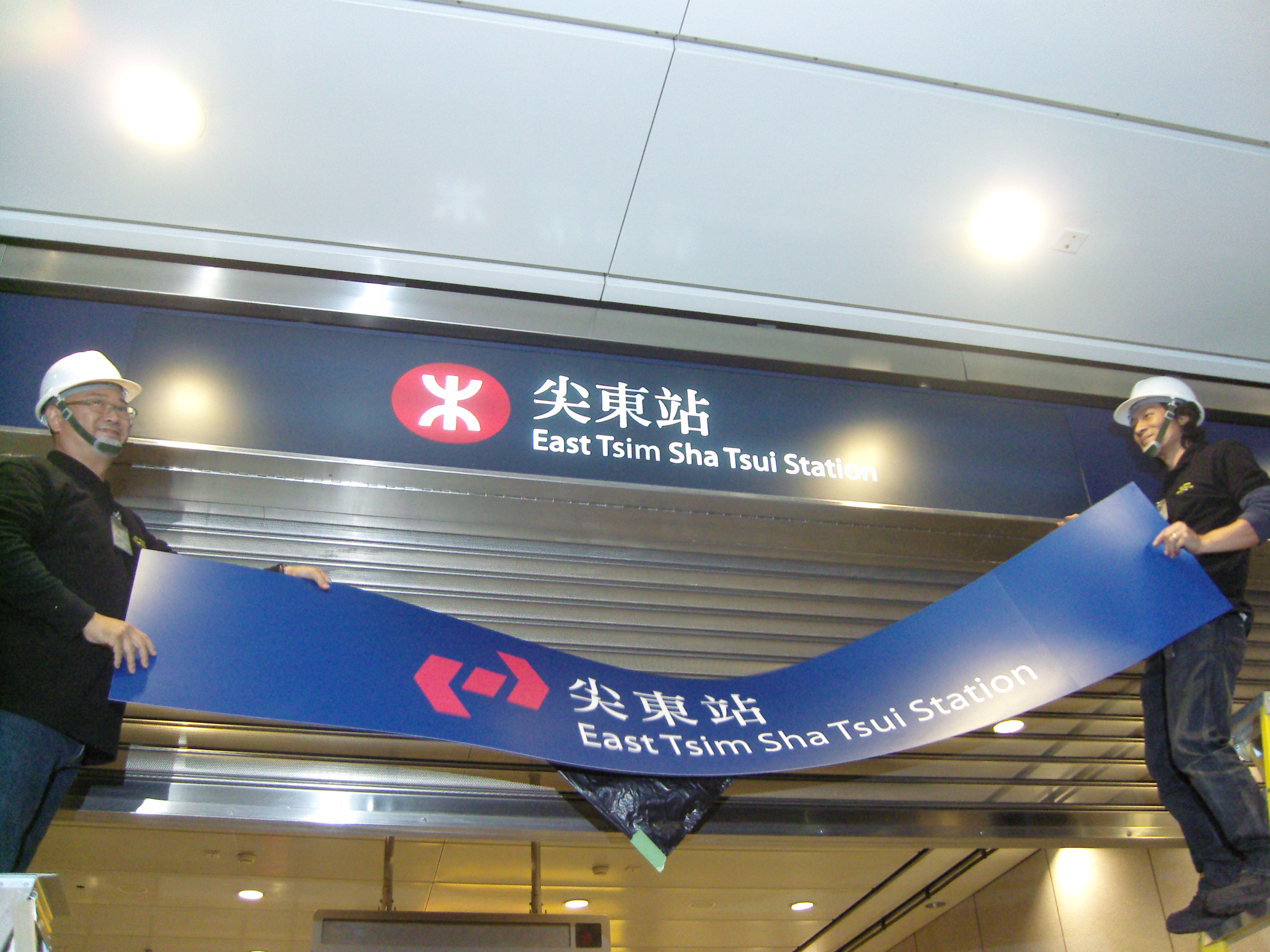
Two workers changing the sign at East Tsim Sha Tsui station after the merger

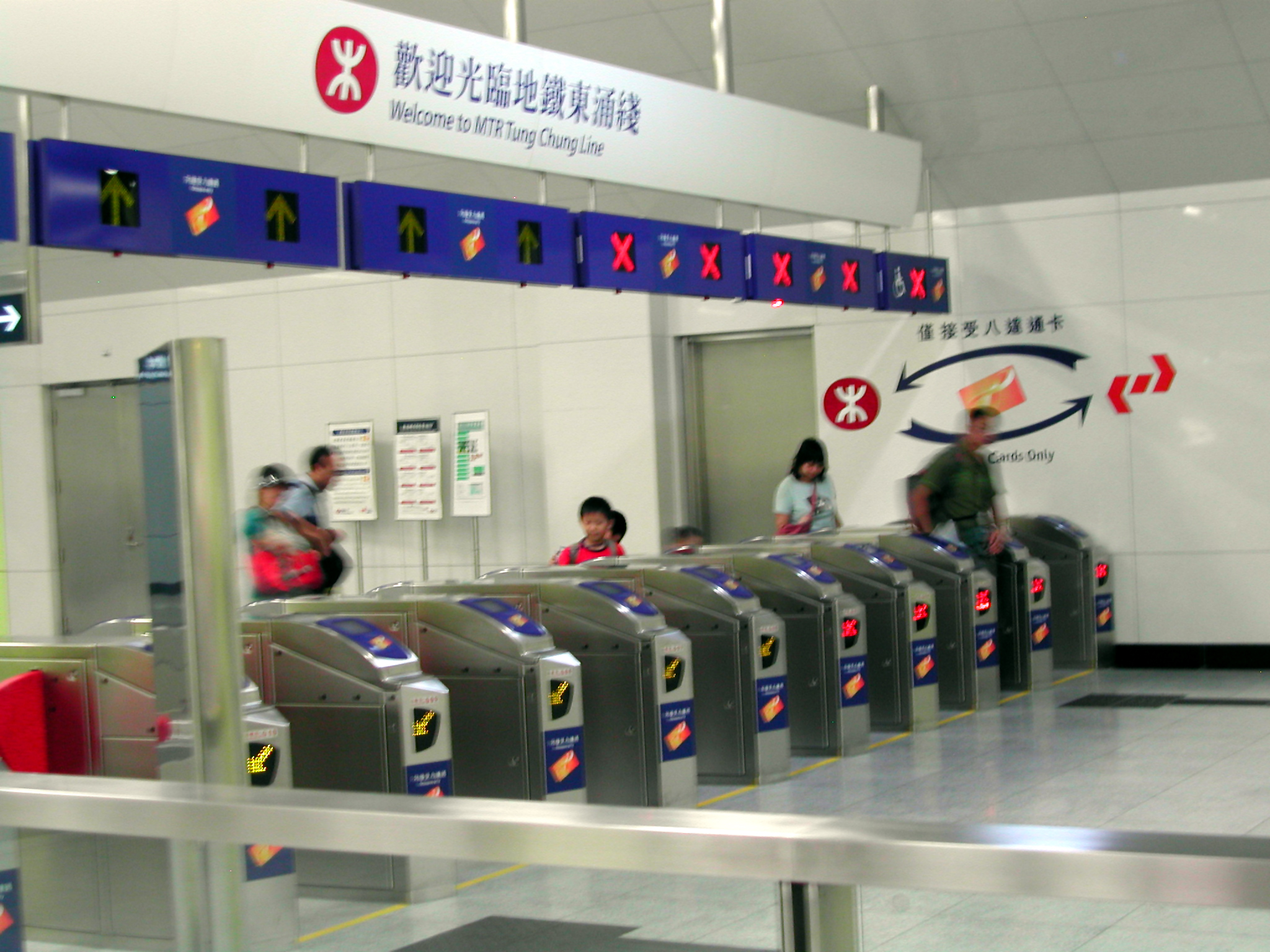
Ticket gates at key interchange stations were removed one year after the merger

On 2 December 2007, the two major railway companies in Hong Kong, the MTR Corporation, which operated the MTR, and the Kowloon-Canton Railway Corporation, which operated the Kowloon-Canton Railway, merged their operations.

== Background ==
There had already been some discussion of merging the KCR, which was also government-owned, and the MTR to make the territory's transport system more efficient. The MTR Corporation (MTRCL) backed such a merge while the Kowloon-Canton Railway Corporation (KCRC) opposed the plan. In March 2004, the Hong Kong government officially encouraged the two companies to merge.

On 11 April 2006, the Hong Kong government officially announced the details of the proposed merger. Under the non-binding memorandum of understanding the government had signed with KCRC, KCRC would grant a service concession to the MTRCL to operate the KCR system, with an initial period of 50 years. The KCRC would receive a one-time upfront payment of HK$4.25 billion, a fixed annual payment of HK$750 million and a variable annual payment based on revenues generated from operation of the KCR system. In addition, MTRCL would make a payment of $7.79 billion for the acquisition of property and other related commercial interests.

The railway lines the KCRC operated were less profitable than the MTRC, and the KCRC was less active in property development. It was widely considered that the government's choice was made to avoid being criticised for selling assets of the KCRC – which it wholly owned – to MTRCL at an underpriced level. Leasing the operation right of the KCR system to the MTRCL could avoid actually selling the KCRC.

On 2 December 2007, the Chinese name of the MTRCL was changed to 香港鐵路有限公司 (Jyutping: hoeng1gong2 tit3lou6 jau5haan6 gung1si1; lit. 'Hong Kong Railway Corporation Limited') after being granted the Service Concession while the English name remained unchanged. The KCRC became a holding company of the KCR system, without actual railway operations.

The merger, effective for 50 years, was approved by shareholders of the MTRCL on 9 October 2007. This also resulted in changing the system's Chinese name from "地鐵" ("Subway") to "港鐵" ("Hong Kong Railway").

== Fare reductions ==
All adult Octopus Card holders were the first to benefit from the merger. Student and Concessionary Octopus holders also benefited from the merger by further reducing $0.1 from their 50% off fares. Student Octopus holders would continue to pay the current reduced concessionary fares on the MTR network. Elderly Octopus holders would be introduced to a new fare system which only the elderly can enjoy a $2 fare to anywhere on the MTR network (excluding Airport Express, Light Rail, and Cross-Boundary Stations).
