= A16 station =

Future MTR station in the New Territories, Hong Kong

A16 第16區
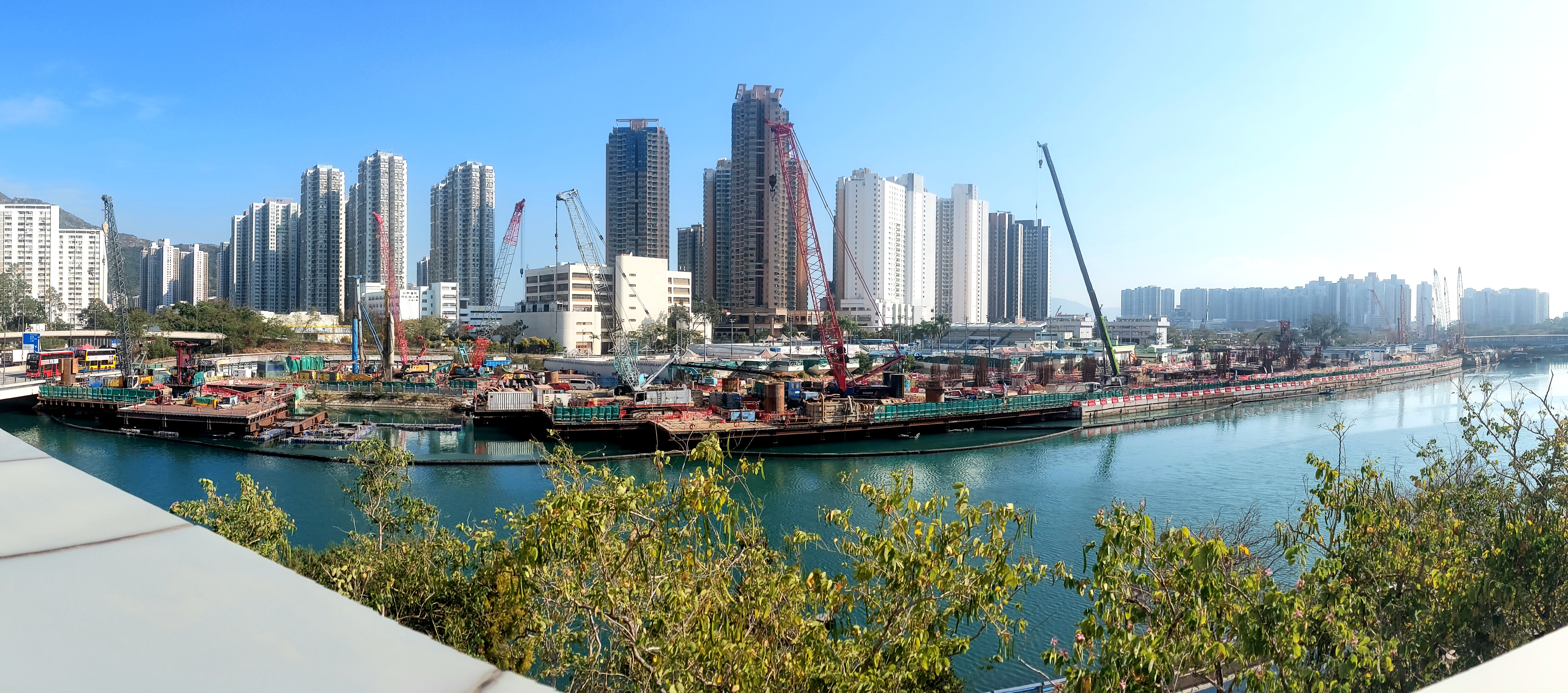
- Site of A16 station in January 2026

General information
- Location: Hoi Wong Road, Tuen Mun; Tuen Mun District, Hong Kong
- Coordinates: 22°23′05″N 113°58′10″E
- System: Planned MTR rapid transit station (Approved, construction expected to begin 2023)
- Owner: MTR Corporation
- Operator: MTR Corporation
- Line: Tuen Ma line
- Platforms: 2 (1 island platform)
- Tracks: 2

Construction
- Structure type: Elevated
- Platform levels: 1

Other information
- Status: Constructing
- Website: Tuen Mun South Extension

History
- Opening: 2030; 4 years' time

Key dates
- 2020: Planning and design commences
- 2022: Project gazetted under the Railways Ordinance
- 2022: Environmental permit approved
- 2023: Expected commencement of construction
- 2030: Expected completion of construction

Services
Preceding station	MTR	Following station
Tuen Mun South Terminus	Tuen Ma line Tuen Mun South extension	Tuen Mun towards Wu Kai Sha
Location
- Location within MTR

A16 (provisional name) is an MTR station on the Tuen Ma line to be constructed elevated on the bank of Tuen Mun River at the former site of Tuen Mun Swimming Pool in Tuen Mun Area 16. The construction of the station is gazetted as part of the Tuen Mun South extension by the Hong Kong Government in January 2022. It was planned to begin construction in 2023.The station is expected to open for service in 2030.

== Station layout ==
The station will be built with three levels, with station entrances at grade, concourse one level above ground, and platforms above the concourse. The station will have an island platform, and two siding tracks on each side of the main tracks.

Platforms	Platform 2	Tuen Ma line towards Wu Kai Sha (Tuen Mun) →
Platforms	Island platform, doors will open on the right
Platforms	Platform 1	← Tuen Ma line towards Tuen Mun South (terminus)
Concourse
Ground level		Exits

== History ==
South China Morning Post reported on June 5, 2018, that according to sources, the MTRC plans for an additional station between the Tuen Mun and Tuen Mun South stations, displacing the current Tuen Mun Swimming Pool, along with 8,000 residential flats in the area.

In May 2019, Michael Tien, former chairman of the KCRC and a panel member of the Panel on Transport of LegCo, announced plans for an additional station near Tuen Mun Swimming Pool. Tien also mentioned the possibility of adopting a "Rail + Property" model, where MTRC would fund the line construction, and the Hong Kong Government would provide land for building housing estates as compensation. It is anticipated that this development would result in the construction of 6 to 7 thousand private housing flats and 13,000 public housing flats.

The construction of the station was gazetted as part of the Tuen Mun South extension by the Hong Kong Government in January 2022. The environmental impact assessment was approved in July 2022.
