= Siu Hei stop =

Light rail stop in Tuen Mun, Hong Kong

Coordinates: 22°22′33″N 113°57′59″E

Siu Hei 兆禧
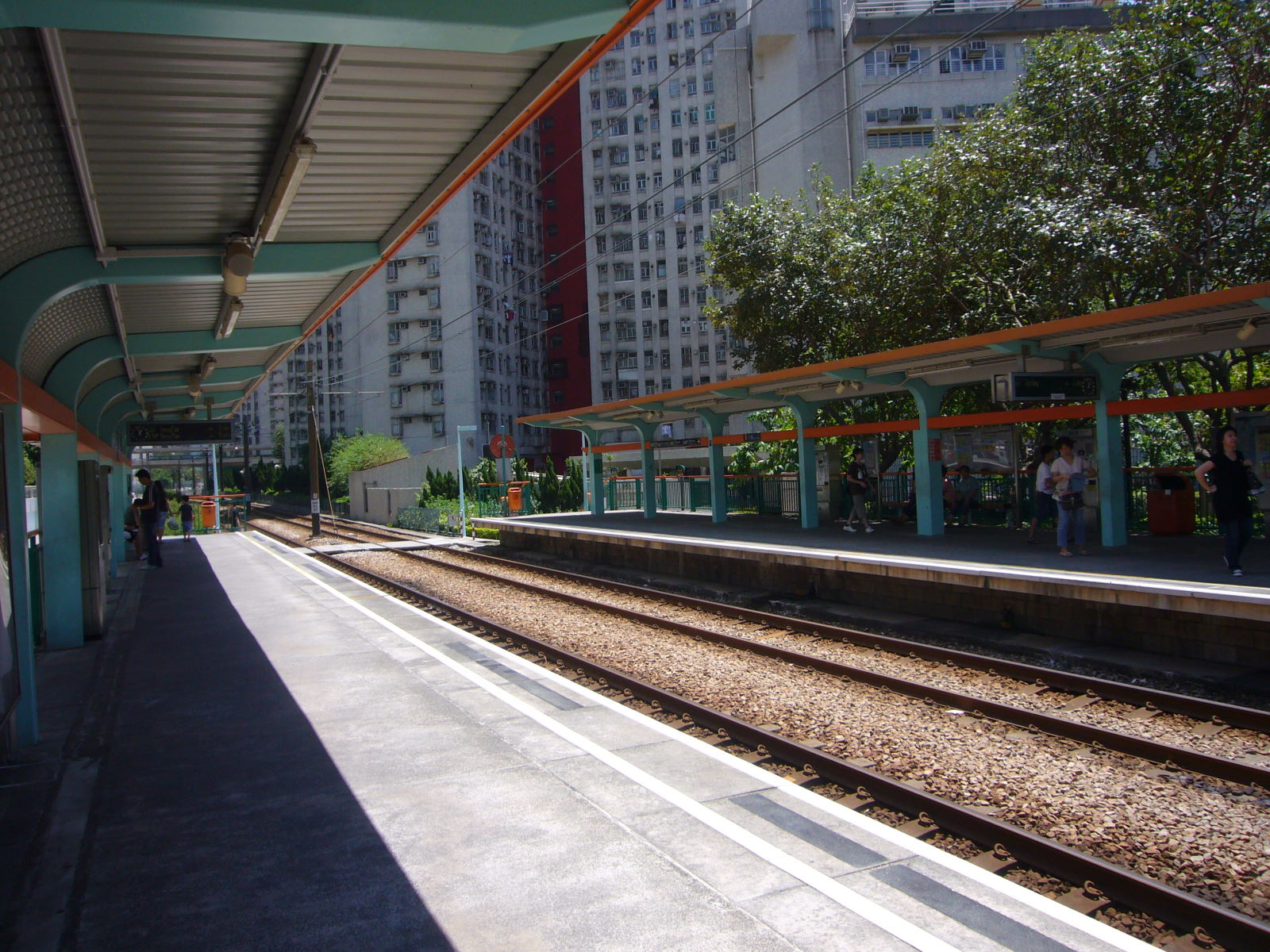
- Siu Hei stop platform

General information
- Location: Siu Hei Court and Yuet Wu Villa; Tuen Mun District; Hong Kong
- System: MTR Light Rail stop
- Owner: KCR Corporation
- Operator: MTR Corporation
- Line: 507 614 614P
- Platforms: 2 side platforms
- Tracks: 2
- Connections: Bus, minibus

Construction
- Structure type: At-grade
- Accessible: yes

Other information
- Station code: SHE (English code); 240 (Digital code)
- Fare zone: 1

History
- Opened: 17 November 1991; 34 years ago

Services
Preceding stop	MTR Light Rail	Following stop
Hoi Wong Road towards Tin King	507	Tuen Mun Ferry Pier Terminus
Tuen Mun Ferry Pier Terminus	614	Hoi Wong Road towards Yuen Long
Tuen Mun Ferry Pier Terminus	614P	Hoi Wong Road towards Siu Hong
Location
- Location within MTR

Siu Hei (Chinese: 兆禧) is an MTR Light Rail stop in Hong Kong located at ground level at Wu On Street between Siu Hei Court and Yuet Wu Villa, in Tuen Mun District. It began service on 17 November 1991 and belongs to Zone 1. It serves Siu Hei Court, Yuet Wu Villa and Wu King Estate.
