= MTR Metro Cammell EMU =

MTR Metro Cammell EMU may refer to:

- MTR Metro Cammell EMU (AC), also known as the Mid-Life Refurbishment (MLR) Train, used to serve the East Rail line (decommissioned in 2022)
- MTR Metro Cammell EMU (DC), also known as the M-Train or Modernization Train, serving the Tsuen Wan, Island, Tseung Kwan O and Disneyland Resort lines
