= 2017 Leuven derailment =

Derailment of a passenger train in Belgium

Coordinates: 50.8972°N 4.7118°E

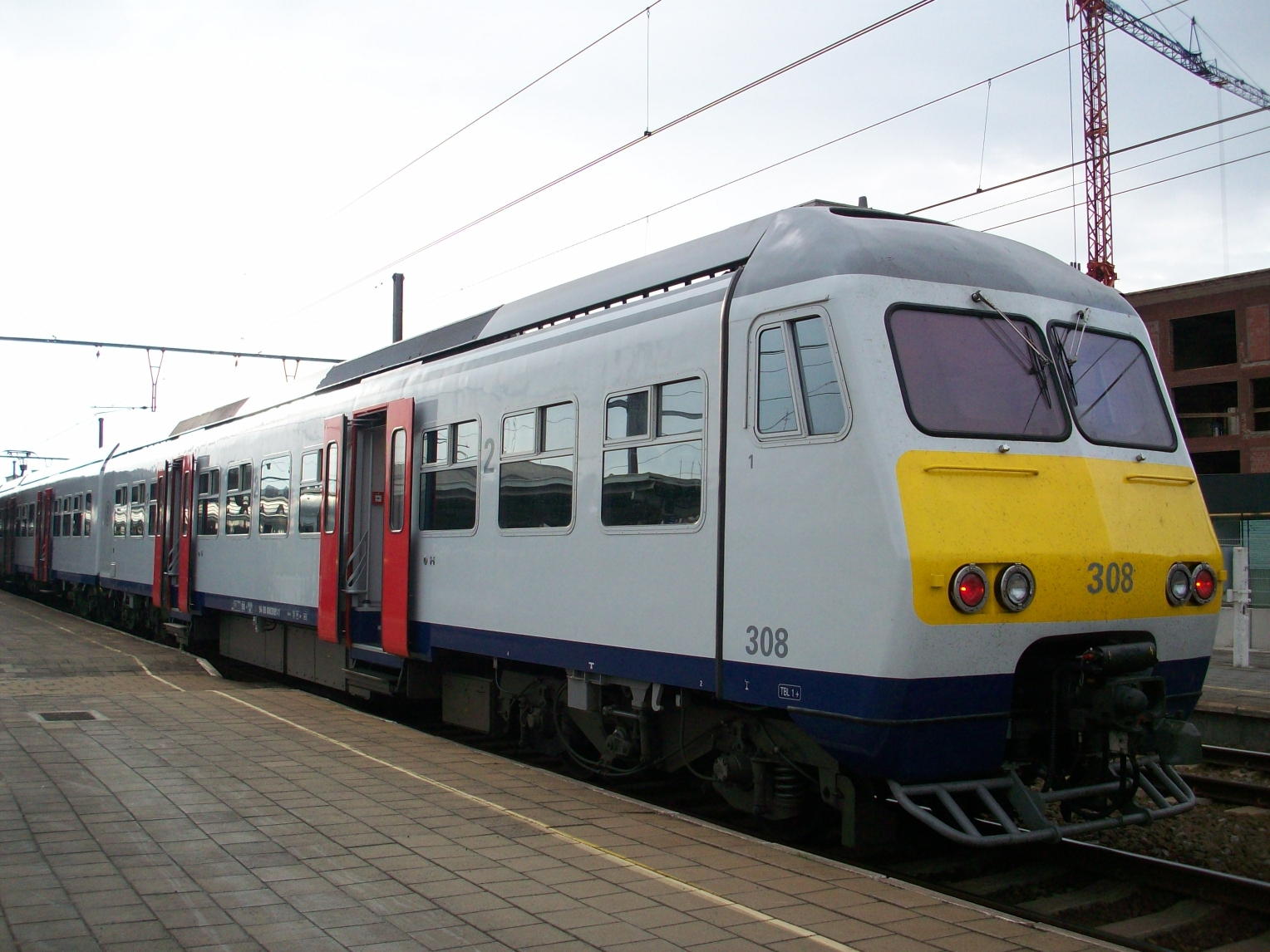
- The train involved was an AM80, similar to this one

- Location within Belgium

Details
- Date: 18 February 2017; 13:13 CET
- Location: Leuven
- Country: Belgium
- Operator: SNCB/NMBS
- Incident type: Derailment
- Cause: Excessive speed

Statistics
- Trains: 1
- Passengers: 85
- Deaths: 1
- Injured: 27

A derailment of a passenger train occurred on 18 February 2017 at Leuven, Belgium. One person was killed and 27 were injured. The cause of the derailment was excessive speed through a set of points.

== Accident ==
At 13:13 CET (12:13 UTC), a 3-car passenger train operated by a single AM80 electric multiple unit No.326 was derailed shortly after leaving Leuven. The front carriage fell on its side, the centre carriage was derailed and the rear carriage remained on the tracks. The train had just left Leuven for Brussels, and De Panne. It had travelled 500 metres (550 yd) when the accident happened. One person was killed and 27 were injured, three seriously. Fourteen of the victims were taken to hospital. A further 57 passengers were uninjured. It was initially thought that the victim was not on board the train, but this theory was later discounted and it was confirmed that he was a passenger.

Belgian Prime Minister Charles Michel visited the site. He tweeted his thanks to the emergency services for their rapid intervention following the accident.

Following the accident, trains between Brussels and Liège were cancelled, although they were able to run between Leuven and Ottignies. One track was reopened to traffic by 18:00. The three carriages of the train were removed from the site during the night of 19–20 February.

== Investigations ==
The Railway Accident and Incident Investigation Unit, Belgian police, and SNCB have opened investigations into the accident. The police investigation revealed excessive speed through a set of points to be the cause of the derailment. The train was travelling at 100 kilometres per hour (62 mph) where the speed limit was 40 kilometres per hour (25 mph).

According to the Railway Accident and Incident Investigation Unit final report, the driver was distracted and accelerated too soon and the train protection system (TBL1++) was not designed to monitor the speed and apply emergency braking in this particular sequence of events (Green Yellow Horizontal signal). Also may have been confused by the complex track and signal layout and by a misleading speed sign meant for another track, which was promptly removed.
