= MTR Metro Cammell EMU (AC) =

Model of electric multiple unit

East Rail line Metro Cammell EMU (MLR) 3094/K01/K03/K05 stock 港鐵中期翻新列車
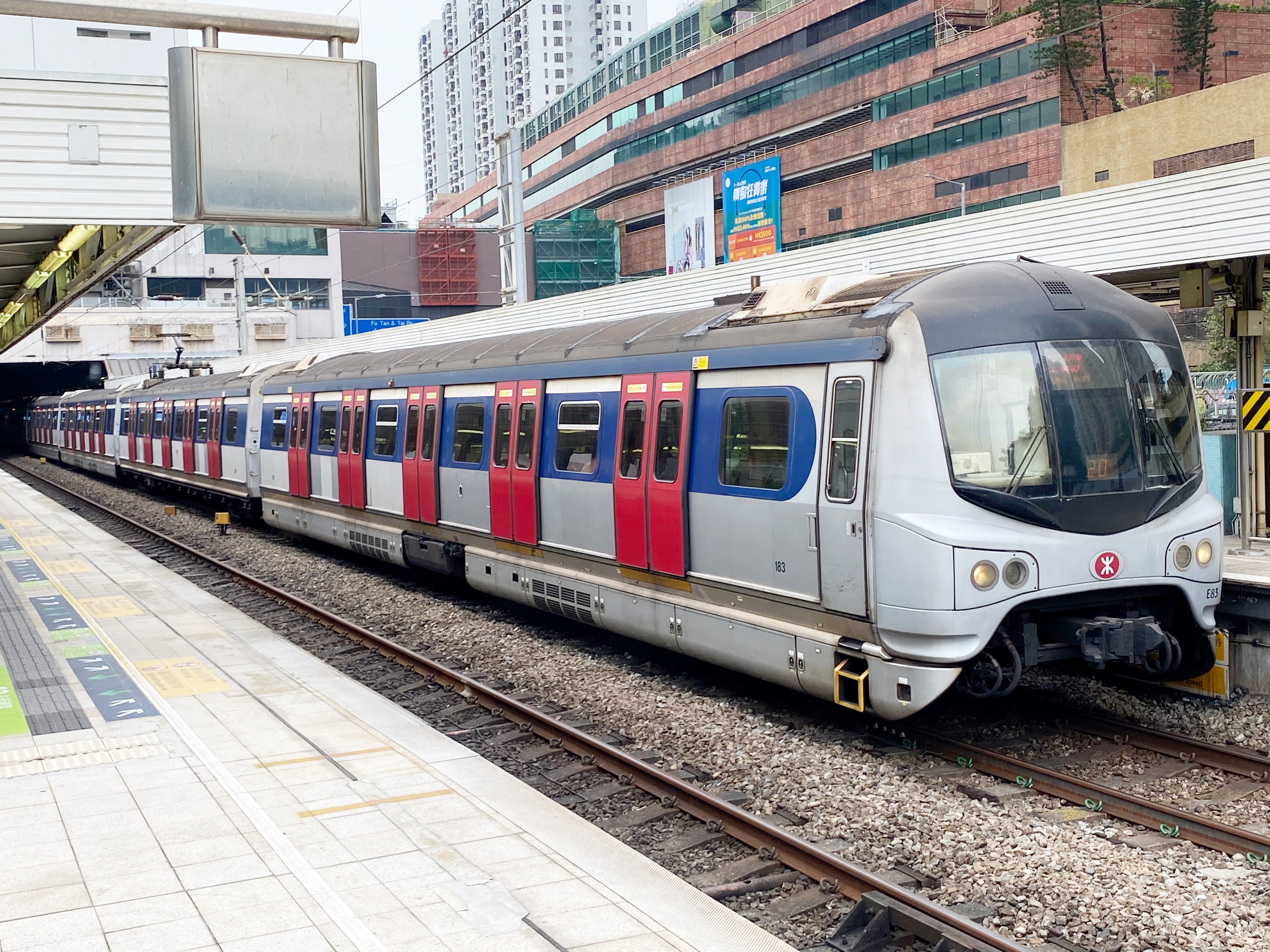
- A refurbished MLR train at Sha Tin station

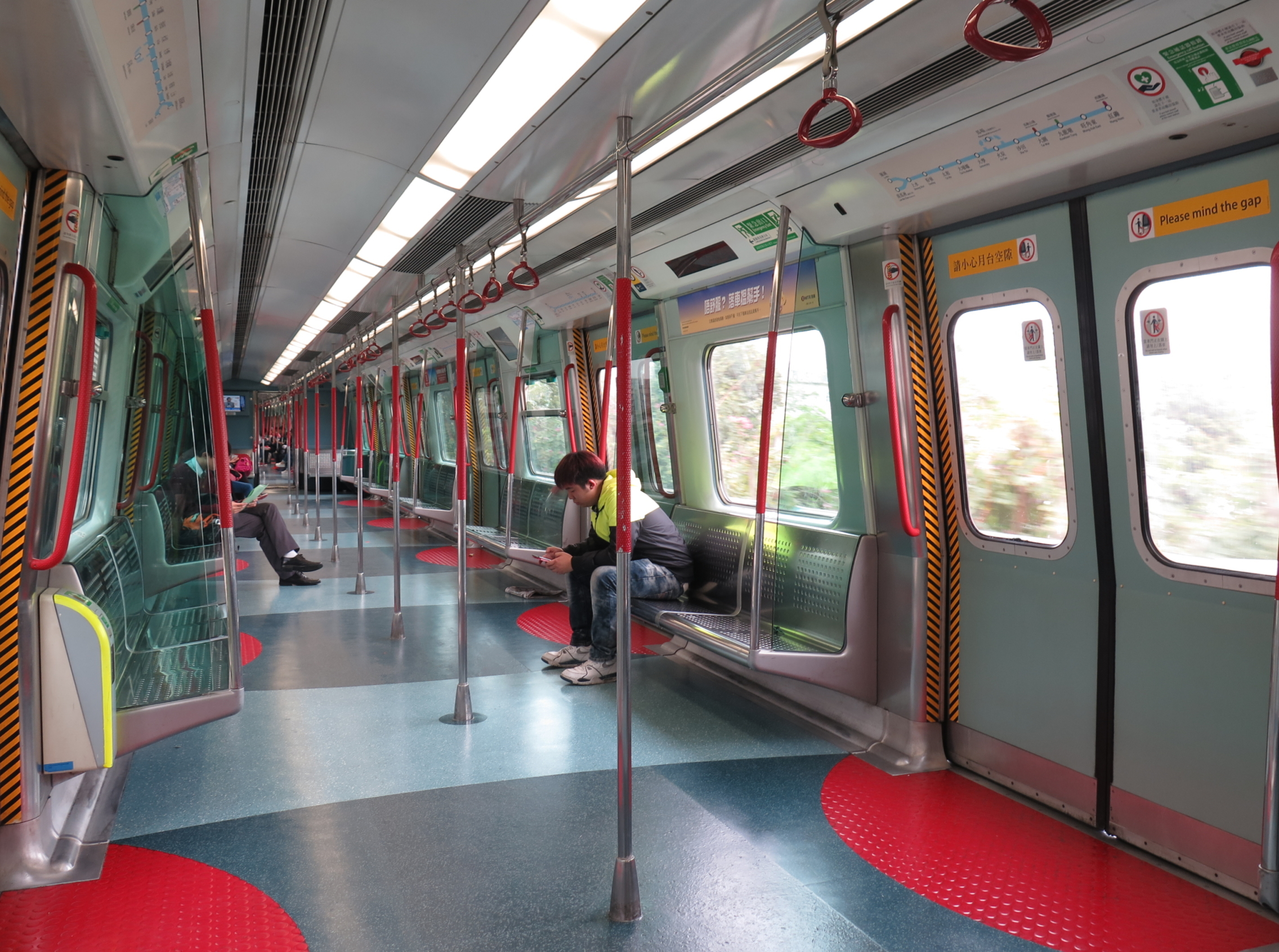
- Interior of a refurbished MLR train
- In service: 6 May 1982 – 6 May 2022 (40 years, 0 days)
- Manufacturers: Metro-Cammell (later GEC-Alsthom, now Alstom)
- Built at: Washwood Heath, Birmingham, England
- Constructed: 1980–1990
- Entered service: 6 May 1982; 44 years ago
- Refurbished: GEC-Alsthom (1996–1999)
- Retired: 6 May 2022; 4 years ago
- Scrapped: 2021–2022 (E45: 1984)(E70/E92: 2020)
- Number built: 354 cars (29 sets and 6 surplus cars)
- Number in service: 0
- Number preserved: 3 cars (unrefurbished)(144+244+444) and 9 cars (refurbished)(377+196, 371+451+271+671+2112+1112, 1114) total 12 cars
- Number scrapped: 28 sets (2 cars [in 1984 accident], 1 car [in 1987 depot accident]; 1 set [Accident/Vandalism]) (additional 1 car in storage), 327 cars scrapped in normal condition
- Successor: Hyundai Rotem EMU (R-Train)
- Formation: 12 cars per trainset (including 1 First Class car) (6 and 9 cars in the past)
- Fleet numbers: 1xx, 2xx, 3xx, 4xx, 5xx, 6xx
- Capacity: 1xx & 3xx cars: 329 passengers per car 2xx, 5xx & 6xx cars: 332 passengers per car 4xx cars: 72 seating passengers per car Total capacity: 3750 people per train
- Owner: Kowloon-Canton Railway Corporation
- Operators: KCR (1982–2007); MTR (2007–2022)
- Depot: Ho Tung Lau
- Line served: East Rail line

Specifications
- Car body construction: Aluminium and plastic
- Train length: 287.62 m (943 ft 7 5/8 in)
- Car length: 23.77 m (77 ft 11 13/16 in) (cars with driver cab); 23.53 m (77 ft 2 3/8 in) (other cars); 24.12 m (79 ft 1 19/32 in) (cars with driver cab and couplers); 23.78 m (78 ft 7/32 in) (other cars with couplers)
- Width: 3.096 m (10 ft 1 7/8 in)
- Height: 3.75 m (12 ft 3 5/8 in) (without rooftop equipment); 4.32 m (14 ft 2 3/32 in) (with pantograph folded)
- Floor height: 3.5 ft (1,066.8 mm)
- Platform height: 3.5 ft (1,066.8 mm)
- Entry: Level boarding
- Doors: 5 per side; 2 per side in First Class cars (originally 3 per side for all); Door centres:7.6 m (24 ft 11.213 in) → 3.8 m (12 ft 5.606 in); Door width: 1.4 m (4 ft 7.118 in)
- Wheel diameter: 850–775 mm (2 ft 9.5 in – 2 ft 6.5 in) (new–worn)
- Wheelbase: 2.5 m (8 ft 2 in)
- Maximum speed: Design 120 km/h (75 mph); Service 120 km/h (75 mph); ATO limitation under TBL signalling 110 km/h (68 mph)
- Axle load: 16,000 kg (35,274 lb)
- Traction system: GEC Traction; 1982–1989: Tap changer 1989–present, K03/K05 Stock, refurbishment: GTO Thyristor phase angle control
- Traction motors: G315AZ DC series-wound motor (GEC Traction)
- Power output: 225 kW (301.730 hp) per motor 3,600 kW (4,827.680 hp) per 12 car set
- Acceleration: Maximum 2.56 km/(h⋅s) (1.591 mph/s)
- Deceleration: 3.168 km/(h⋅s) (1.969 mph/s) (service); 5 km/(h⋅s) (3.107 mph/s) (emergency)
- Power supply: AC-DC
- Electric system: 25 kV 50 Hz AC Catenary
- Current collection: Single-arm Pantograph
- Bogies: Duewag SF2100
- Braking system: WestingHouse Westcode 7-Step Electro-Pneumatic
- Safety systems: Westinghouse Brake and Signal Company Ltd AWS (former), After 1994–1998: GEC-Alsthom TBL2 (enhanced with ATP and ATS with ATO (Year:2002), After 2021: Siemens Trainguard MT CBTC ATO and ATP
- Coupling system: Tightlock coupling, Scharfenberg coupler, Semi-permanent coupler
- Seating: Standard class: Longitudinal; First class and standard class end areas: Transverse
- Track gauge: 1,435 mm (4 ft 8 1/2 in) standard gauge

Notes/references
- Bogie centres:16,100 mm (52 ft 9.858 in); Coupler Intermediate Carriage to Sharfenberg Coupler during Mid-Life refurbishment)

The East Rail line Metro Cammell EMU (also known as Mid-Life Refurbishment Train, Chinese: 港鐵中期翻新列車; or MLR Train) were a model of electric multiple unit built in 1980–1990 by Metro-Cammell for the original Kowloon–Canton Railway (now the East Rail line) in Hong Kong. The 29 sets were owned by and were originally operated by the Kowloon-Canton Railway Corporation (KCRC). They were operated by MTR Corporation (MTRC) after it merged with KCRC in 2007. Although another set of EMU trains from the same manufacturer operate on some of MTR's own lines, there are some significant differences between the two models, with the Metro Cammell EMUs of the original MTR being known as the M-Train.

The trains were delivered in several phases. The different phases of this series of train have entitled with different model numbers, including: 3094 stock, K01 stock, K03 stock and K05 stock. Regardless, all model numbers have an identical appearance. After the rail merger, the KCR logos on the MLR trains were replaced with those of MTR, and a revised route map was introduced in the train interiors. Skirts were also added to all carriages, but the pantograph cars had their skirts removed due to heating issues. The interior floor was also changed for a darker blue in between two red aesthetics, and a brighter blue in between two windows.

Since the 2007 merger, the MLR was the second oldest variation of EMU operating on the MTR network, behind the M-Train sets of from 1979. It was also the only electric multiple unit of the Mass Transit Railway that did not have regenerative braking, as noted due to the lack of motor sound and the presence of air brake sounds while braking. All of the sets were retired on 6 May 2022, on the 40th anniversary of the electrification of the East Rail Line, with the Hyundai Rotem EMUs replacing them prior to the opening of the extension of the East Rail line to Admiralty station.

== History ==
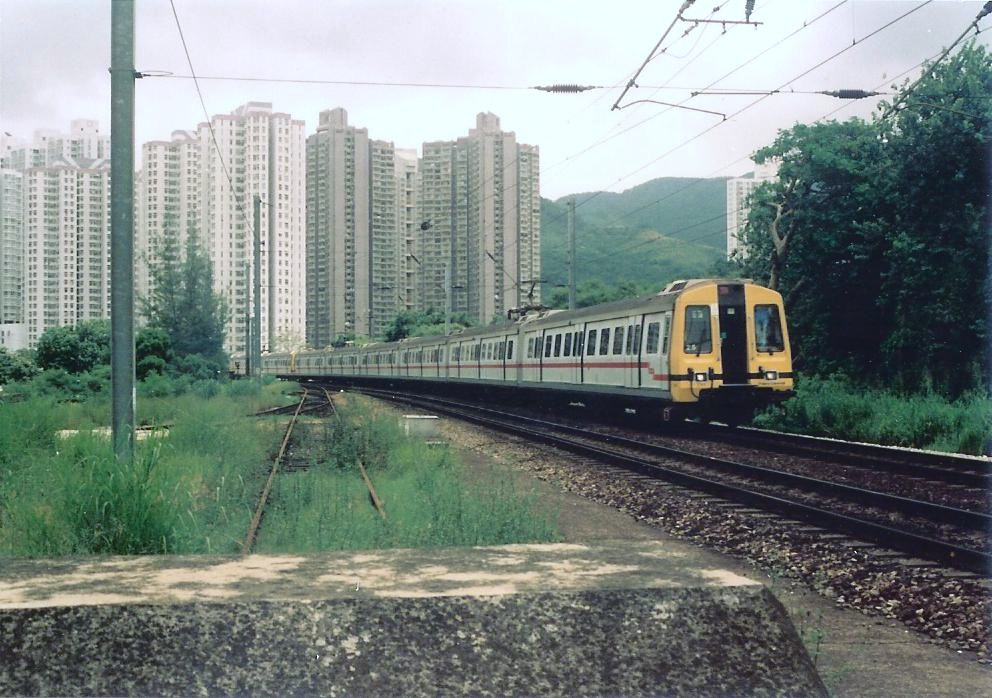
A Metro Cammell EMU train in original form in 1993.

The trains were ordered during the electrification of the KCR British section, now known as MTR East Rail line, in 1978. Sets E1-E45 and E46-E61 were delivered to KCRC in 2 batches in 1982–1983, when electrification was first completed between Hung Hom and Sha Tin in May 1982, and then to Tai Po Market station, and finally to Lo Wu on 16 August 1983. KCRC also reordered further train sets in 1986 (sets E62-E86) and 1990 (sets E87-E118). In the early days of full electrification, these trains sometimes suffered from a temporary loss of electricity while passing University Station because of neutral sections (or dead zones), which was due to the lack of internal batteries.

The exteriors of the trains before refurbishment featured a red stripe running down the length of the trains, and yellow driving cabs located on the first and last cars. Due to the aforementioned colour of the cab, the train was commonly referred to as the "Yellow Head". (Chinese: 黃頭)

The trains were initially operated with 3 cars, they were subsequently extended to 6, 9 and 12 cars to cope with increasing ridership. Trains were inconsistent in terms of length, ranging from 3 to 12 cars. By 1992, all trains were formed of 12 cars.

=== Refurbishment ===
Like the DC MTR Metro Cammell EMUs, the KCR Metro Cammell EMUs underwent a major refurbishment from 1996 to 1999 to extend their lifespan, carried out by the successor of Metro Cammell, Alstom (then GEC-Alsthom), and the refurbished unit was subsequently nicknamed the “Fly Head” (Chinese: 烏蠅頭) based on its appearance. This reflected the significant role change of the KCR British section, because of the development of new towns within the New Territories. The first refurbished train was put into service in 1996, while the original yellow-cab train was formally retired with a "Farewell Ride" on 31 October 1999.

The trains were converted to fixed 12-car sets and received a new exterior livery of blue and silverish bodies with red doors; they were reassembled into either a 3+3+6 configuration (3xx 2xx 6xx 4xx 2xx 6xx 6xx 2xx 5xx 5xx 2xx 1xx) or a 3+3+3+3 configuration (3xx 2xx 6xx 4xx 2xx 6xx 5xx 2xx 6xx 5xx 2xx 1xx). The driving trailers also received rebuilt front ends, which did not feature an emergency escape door; and the unnecessary intermediate driving cabs were replaced by standard body ends. The doors were also increased from three doors per side to five doors per car side, replacing some doors with electric doors from the pneumatic ones used on the M-Stock. This was done by removing two windows on both sides, excluding the First Class cars, which have two doors per side. The Interior refurbishments included the replacement of transverse seating by longitudinal bench seats to create more space for standing passengers, although transverse seating was retained in First Class. Also included was changing the ceiling to a rounder one to create a more modern feel. The freight compartment between the driving cab and First Class compartment was removed along with its doors, and was replaced by the windows from the standard class carriages, with the new gangway connections being installed, and together with intermediate driving compartments, toilets (removed in late 1980s) and gangway doors being removed, but retained for First Class carriages. The trains also received new passenger information systems, including multi-colour LED signs displaying train destination, the next station, safety guidelines, and the time and temperature. Included in the refurbishment was changing the colours to teal and a touch of red, with a fire resistant floor, along with installation of emergency stairs for passengers to safely disembark to the trackside, and the installation of 22 in (559 mm) LCD screens mounted above windows, broadcasting looping daily TV news provided by Cable TV Hong Kong (Newsline Express) and advertisements. The safety systems were changed to TBL (enhanced with ATP) from AWS in 1998 and ATC/ATO in 2002. Some time before the merger with MTR, the trains had the middle cab window covered.

The only non-refurbished unit, E44 (144–244–444), was not refurbished since it was the only remaining unit after all of the other units had been formed into 12 car trains. In 2024, it was moved to Hung Hom station’s platform 5, the former southern terminus of the East Rail line, as part of the “Station Rail Voyage” exhibit, which forms part of the celebration events for the 45th anniversary of the MTR company.

== Minor Renovations ==
Between 2006-2012, the driver's cab went under renovation to include the TIS monitoring system and to store computers for the TGMT Signalling System, consequently this covered up the center window of the driver's cab. The instruments were moved slightly further away, and the announcement system was raised up by 10cm. The door panels were also replaced, presumably to complement the Cab Renovations.

== Fleet ==
Cars of East Rail line Metro Cammell train
car type	driver cab	motor	batteries	pantograph	first class	length (mm)	seat	standing capacity	total
1xx	✓	✗	✓	✗	✗	23750	42	287	29
2xx	✗	✓	✗	✓	✗	23750	52	280	116
3xx	✓	✗	✗	✗	✗	23750	47	275	29
4xx	✗	✗	✗	✗	✓	23750	72	-	29
5xx	✗	✗	✗	✗	✗	23750	51/52	280/281	58
6xx	✗	✗	✓	✗	✗	23750	51/52	280/281	87

Configuration of an East Rail line Metro Cammell EMU is as follows: (southbound) 1xx-2xx-5xx+6xx-2xx-5xx+6xx-2xx-4xx+6xx-2xx-3xx (northbound), or (southbound) 1xx-2xx-5xx-5xx-2xx-6xx+6xx-2xx-4xx+6xx-2xx-3xx (northbound).

== Accidents and incidents ==
=== Train accidents ===
==== 1984 Sheung Shui crash incident ====
On 25 November 1984, an East Rail Metro Cammell EMU train derailed between Sheung Shui and Lo Wu station. The incident occurred when the driver, preparing to back the train up to Sheung Shui station, failed to follow a speed/stop signal while the train was exceeding the speed limit. The train crashed into a boulder buffer with the first two cars piling on top of each other. The degree of damage was so extensive that the cars never returned to service. Passengers were unloaded prior to the crash while the driver sustained only minor injuries. However, the accident caused train services to be suspended for the rest of the day and the incident spurred a series of public outcries concerning railway safety. Set E45 (which was 233–234–235) was hence commissioned as a result of the accident to replace the damaged cars.

The depot accident on 1987 included the only remaining coach no. 233 on E45, and coach no. 272 on E58. 233 took over the crashed 272 on E58 and became the current 458 in the late 90s, which has been retired in 2022 April. After then, the whole set E45 was scrapped in the 90s, and a 1:1 yellow head model was reconstructed until it made room for the retired locomotive 51.

==== 2019 East Rail line derailment ====
On 17 September 2019, a 12-car Metro Cammell EMU train(E81/E21) servicing the East Rail line derailed while approaching Hung Hom station. Services between Hung Hom station and Mong Kok East station and the Intercity Through Train were cancelled for several days. Eight passengers were injured during the derailing. The derailment was attributed to deteriorated sleepers widening the track gauge. 4 cars were scrapped (including First Class) and 4 other cars from E92/E70 were repaired and used for the derailment train.

=== Underframe cracking ===
On 21 December 2005, an East Rail Metro Cammell EMU train failed while in operation. Following examination of the train, KCRC staff detected minor cracks in the welding of mounting brackets for some underframe components. A review panel commissioned by KCRC looked into the problem from four aspects:

- the rate of change of the acceleration and deceleration of trains
- the welding of components' mounting brackets
- the profile of the track and train wheels
- suspension system

Since the full introduction of Automatic train operation (ATO) on the East Rail system in 2002, the rate of change of acceleration and deceleration resulting from ATO driving added stress to the underframe components. To allow a root cause investigation to be carried out, the use of the ATO system was suspended on 15 January 2006, leaving the operation of trains back in the hands of the train drivers, the safety of train operation under the control of the Automatic Train Protection system. This resulted in a decreased frequency (from 24 to 23 trains per hour) and lengthened trip time (increase by 90 seconds to 42.5 minutes). KCRC also temporarily transferred some staff from West Rail to cope with recent maintenance of trains.

The Environment, Transport and Works Bureau reprimanded the KCRC for not immediately notifying the Government when it found problems with its East Rail trains in 2005. Secretary for the Bureau Dr Sarah Liao said she has ordered the KCRC to inspect all its trains, and did not rule out suspending services if there are safety doubts. Dr Liao ordered the chairman to review the corporation's operations, including its management and overall system, and submit a report. KCRC chairman Michael Tien accepted responsibility for the corporation's poor judgement in not sharing the information with the public in a timely matter.

On 21 January 2006, Michael Tien stated that the safety problems of East Rail had been controlled, and the train service was expected to operate as usual, including train service in the Chinese New Year. KCRC East Rail trains reverted to ATO operation on 6 August 2006, after the investigation confirmed that the ATO system is not a direct cause of the cracking.

== Replacement ==
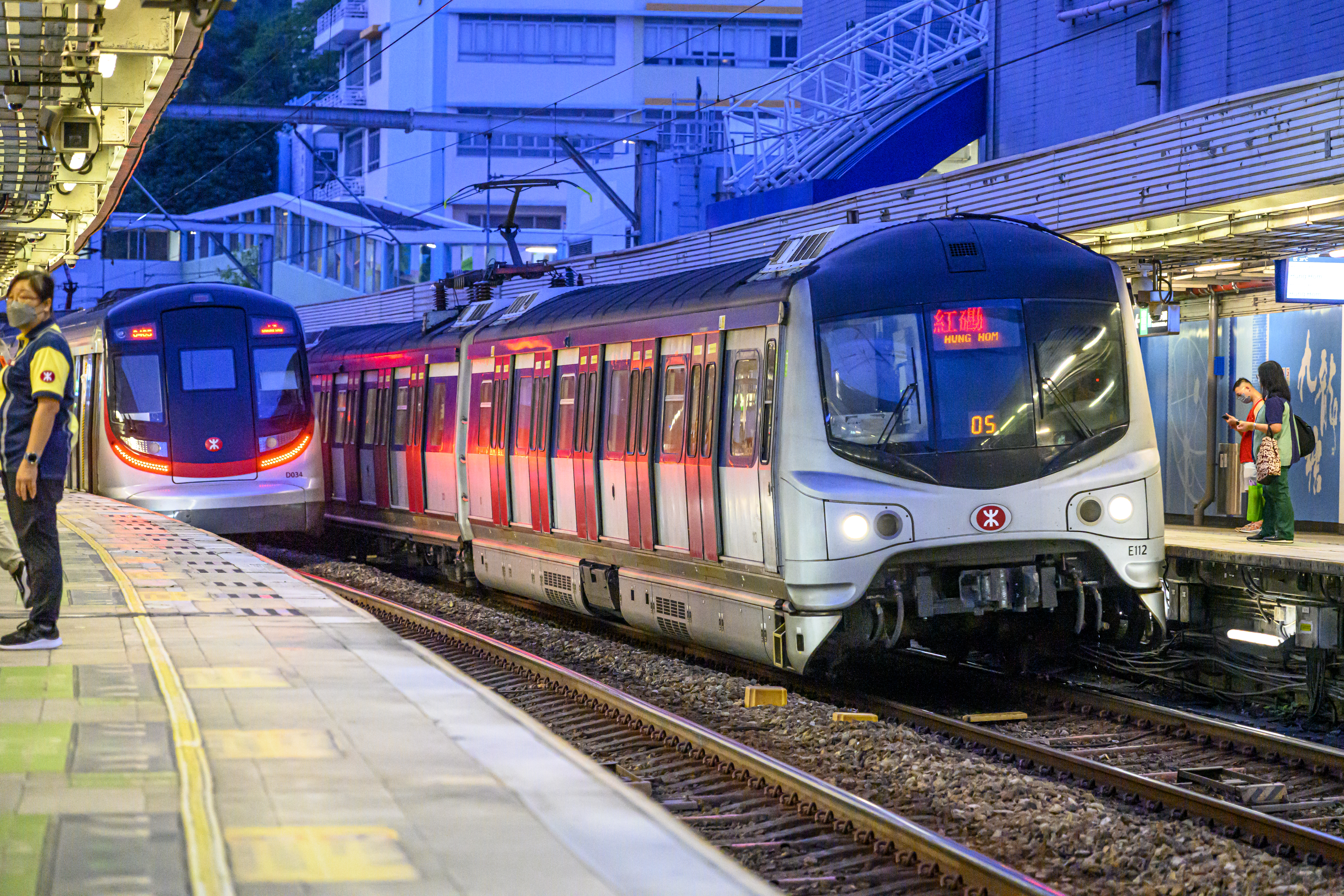
Southbound MLR (right) and northbound R-Train (left) at Kowloon Tong

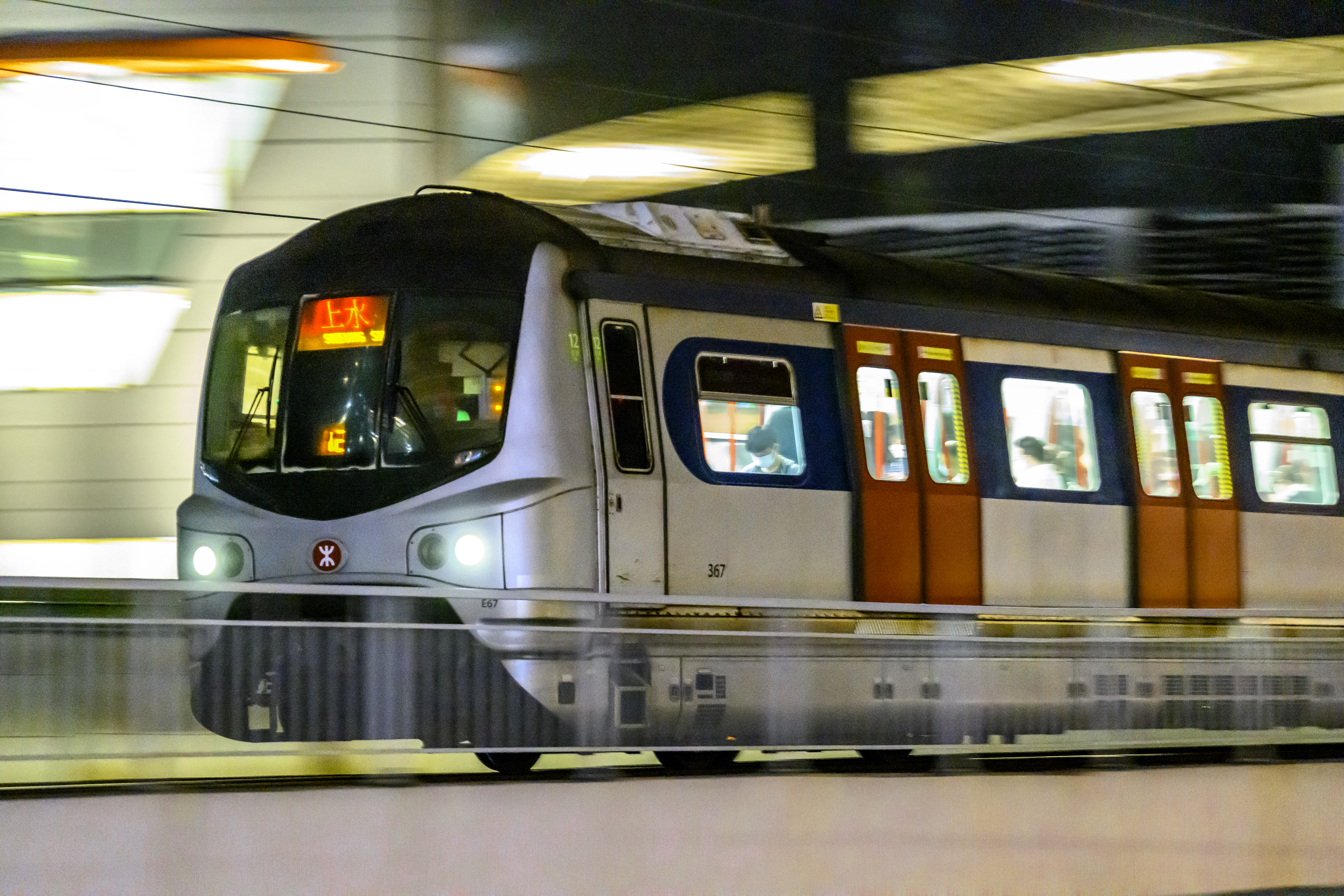
MLR E67-E114 seen departing from Tai Wai Station on the final day of its regular revenue-earning service on 31 March 2022 before being allocated to the reserve fleet.

All 29 MLR sets had been gradually retired from service starting in 2021 (E92/E70 was scrapped in 2020) and, together with the newer SP1900 EMUs built by Kinki Sharyo, were replaced by brand-new Hyundai Rotem EMU trains ordered in December 2012. These 43 9-car "R-Train" sets are manufactured by the same company as the K-Train operating on the Tung Chung line and the Tseung Kwan O line. The MLR was officially retired on 6 May 2022, with the last train leaving Hung Hom at 13:00, formed of train set E112-E71, ending its 40 years of service.

== Other details ==
=== Preserved examples ===
A 1:1 scale model of an in refurbished Metro Cammell EMU was once on display at the Hong Kong Railway Museum, built from components of carriage 272 of set E58. The model has since been scrapped to make room for Locomotive 51. A portion of a retired refurbished MLR carriage (361, northbound carriage) now exists at the Ying Wa College and Primary School, transformed into a classroom. Two carriages (196/377) have been sent to Wan Chai Promenade Harbourfront phase 4 for leisure.

As part of the MTR's 45th anniversary celebrations, MLR train E112-E71, the final train in revenue service, was moved to Hung Hom station for display for Station Rail Voyage, placed across from unrefurbished unit E44.

=== Scrapped units and surplus cars ===
E45 (which was 233–234–235) was supposed to be 145–245–445. After the incident, the only remaining coach was coach no. 233. Coach 233 replaced the crashed 272 in E58 and officially became coach no. 272, and then 458. Due to the extensive damage, coaches 234 and 235 were wrecked in the 1984 accident in a siding, and the only remaining historical train was E44 (144–244–444)(now preserved at Hung Hom Station) and 445, of which 445 was subsequently scrapped by the MTR after refurbishment (445 -> 458) in April of 2022. If these were not involved, 144 and 145 would have become 644 and 645.

== Gallery ==
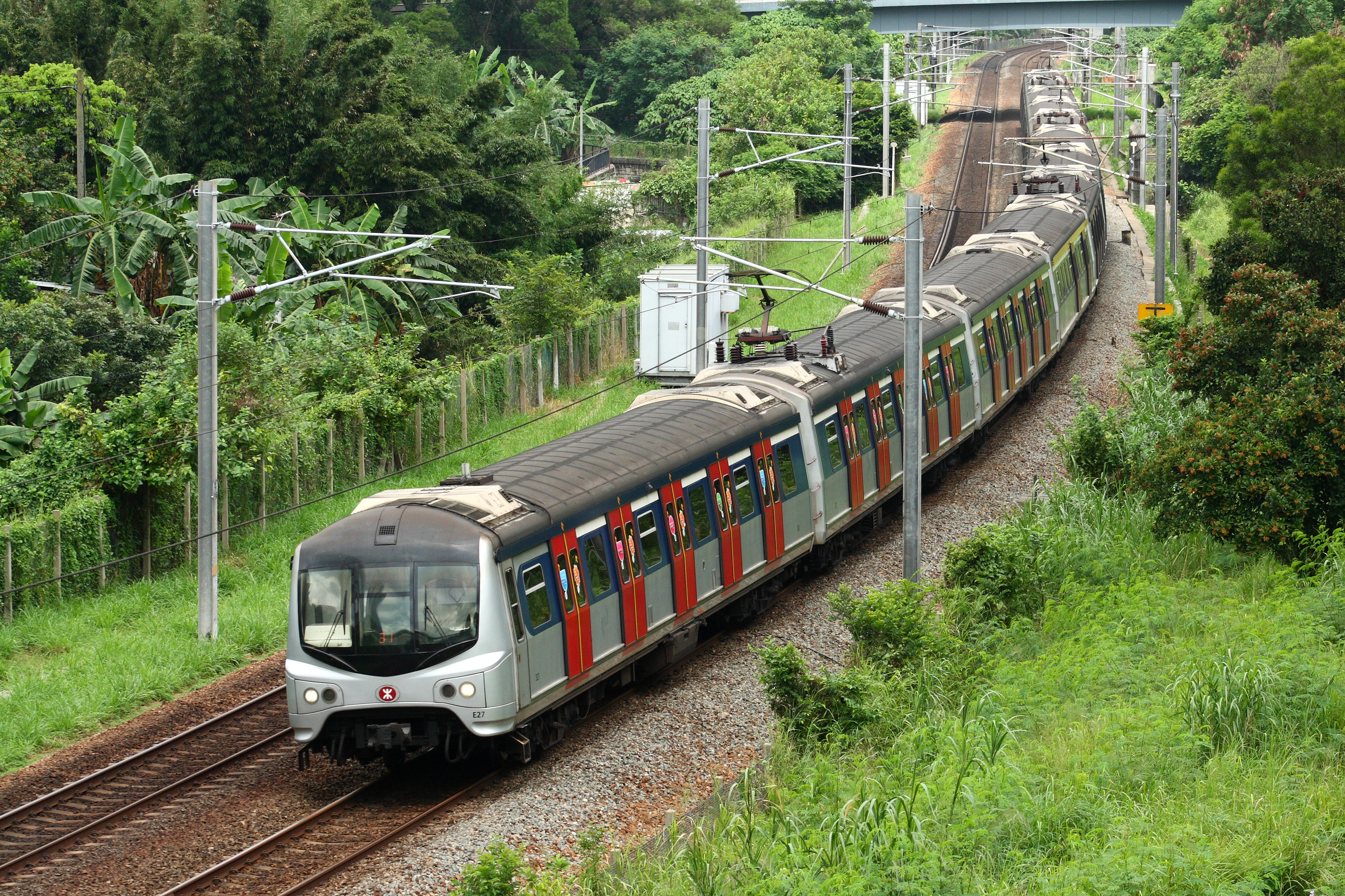
Refurbished Metro Cammell EMU in August 2008

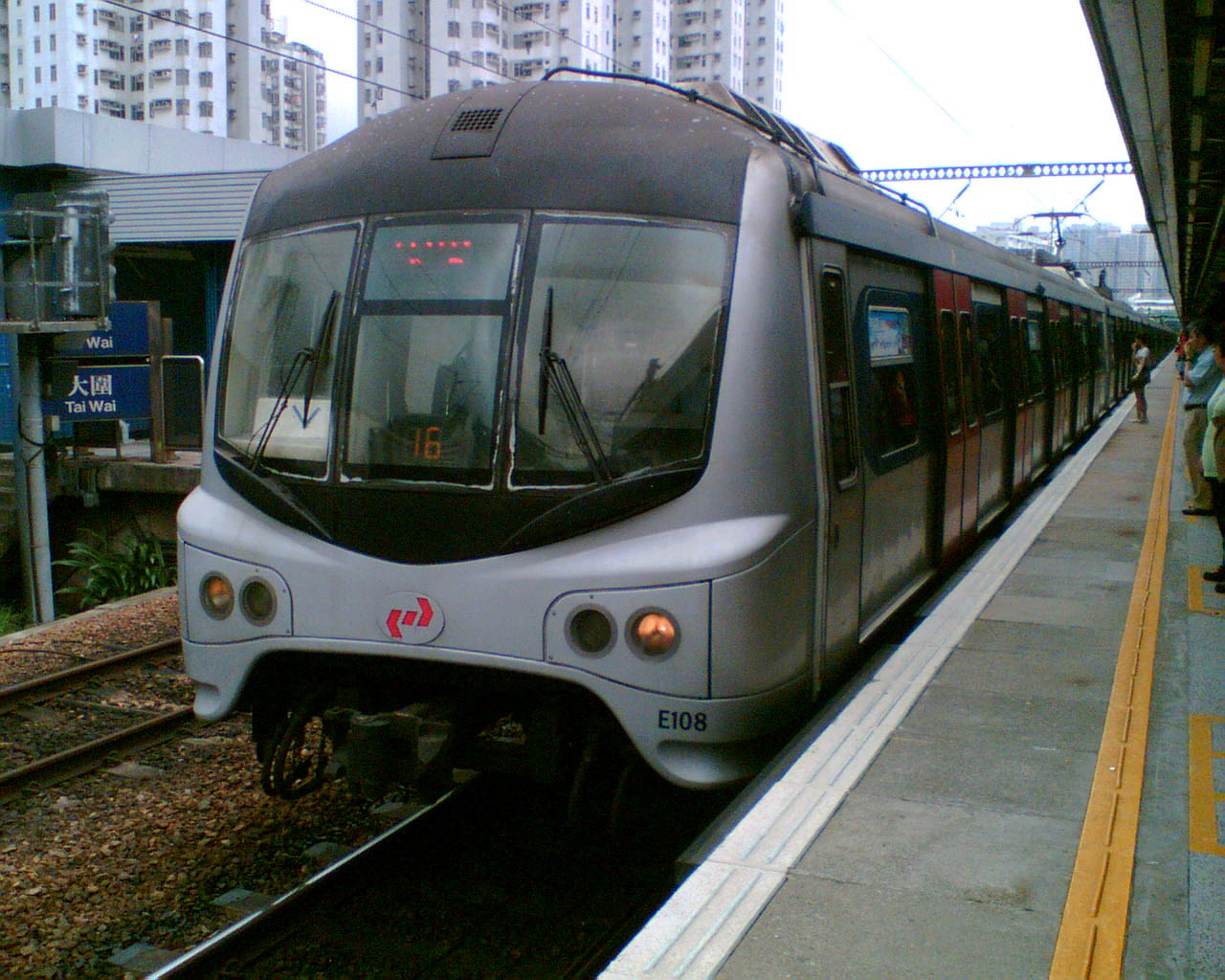
KCR Metro Cammell EMU at Tai Wai

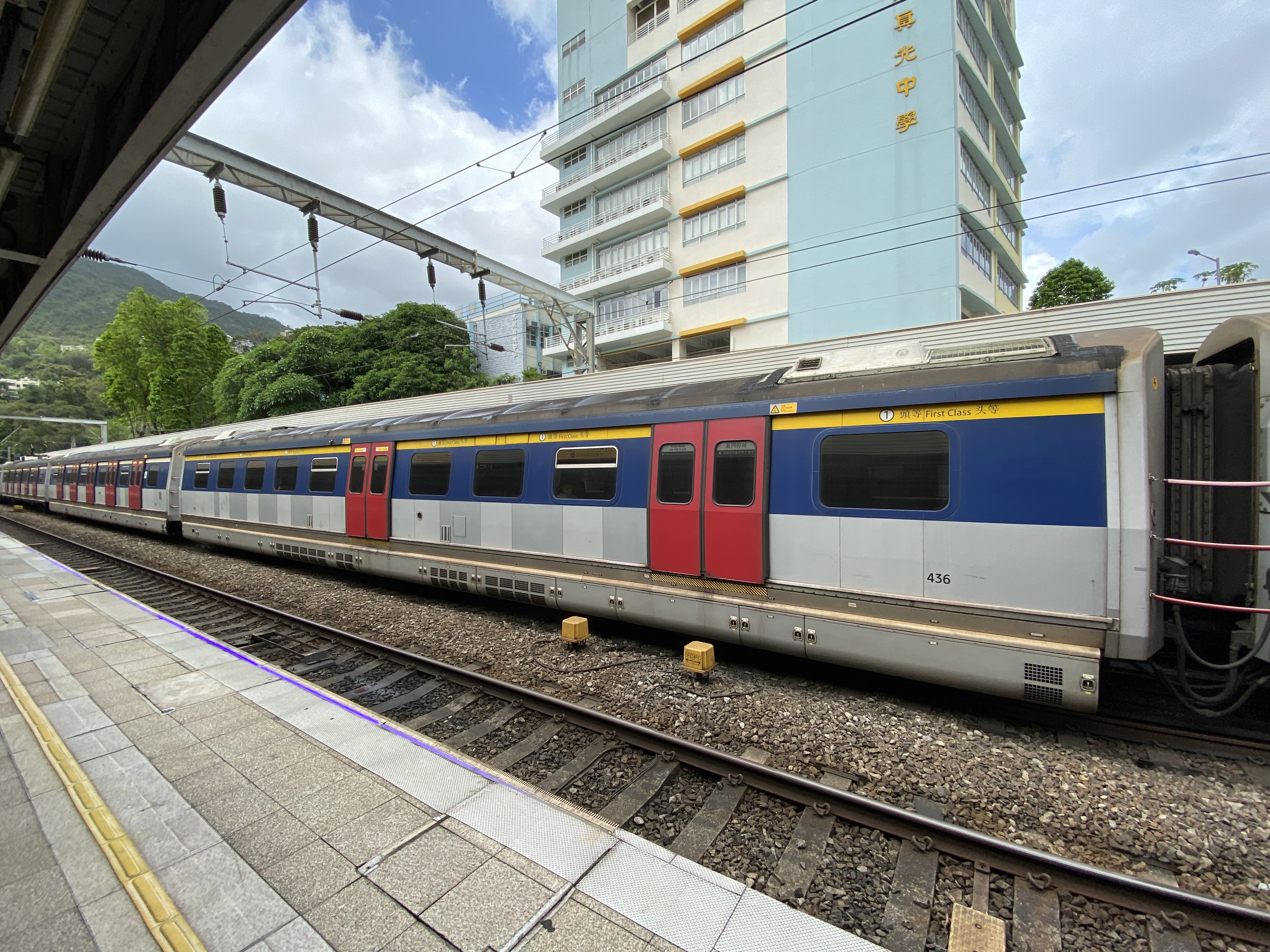
MLR First Class carriage 436 at Kowloon Tong station in 2021

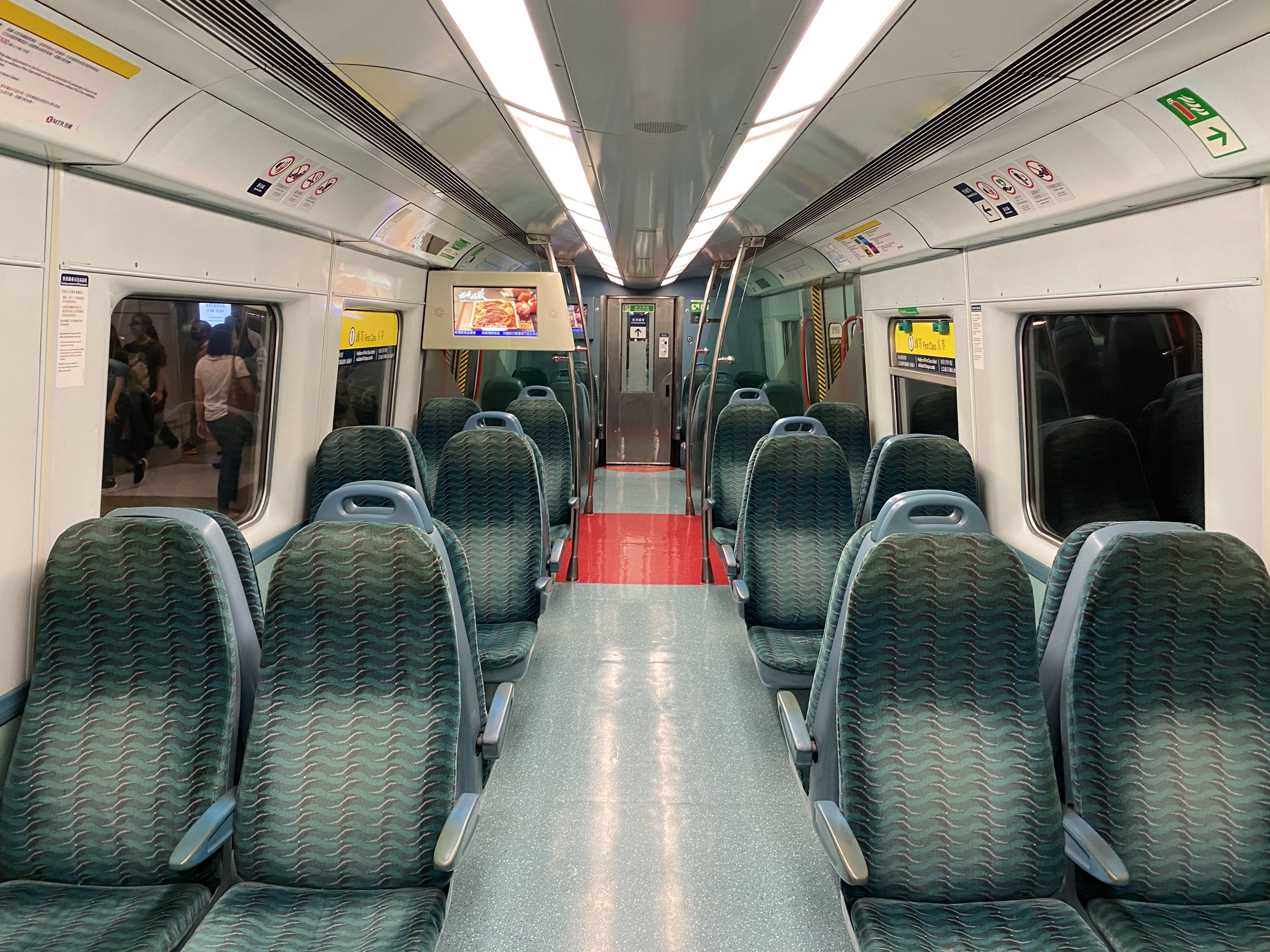
First class seating in a MTR Metro Cammell EMU

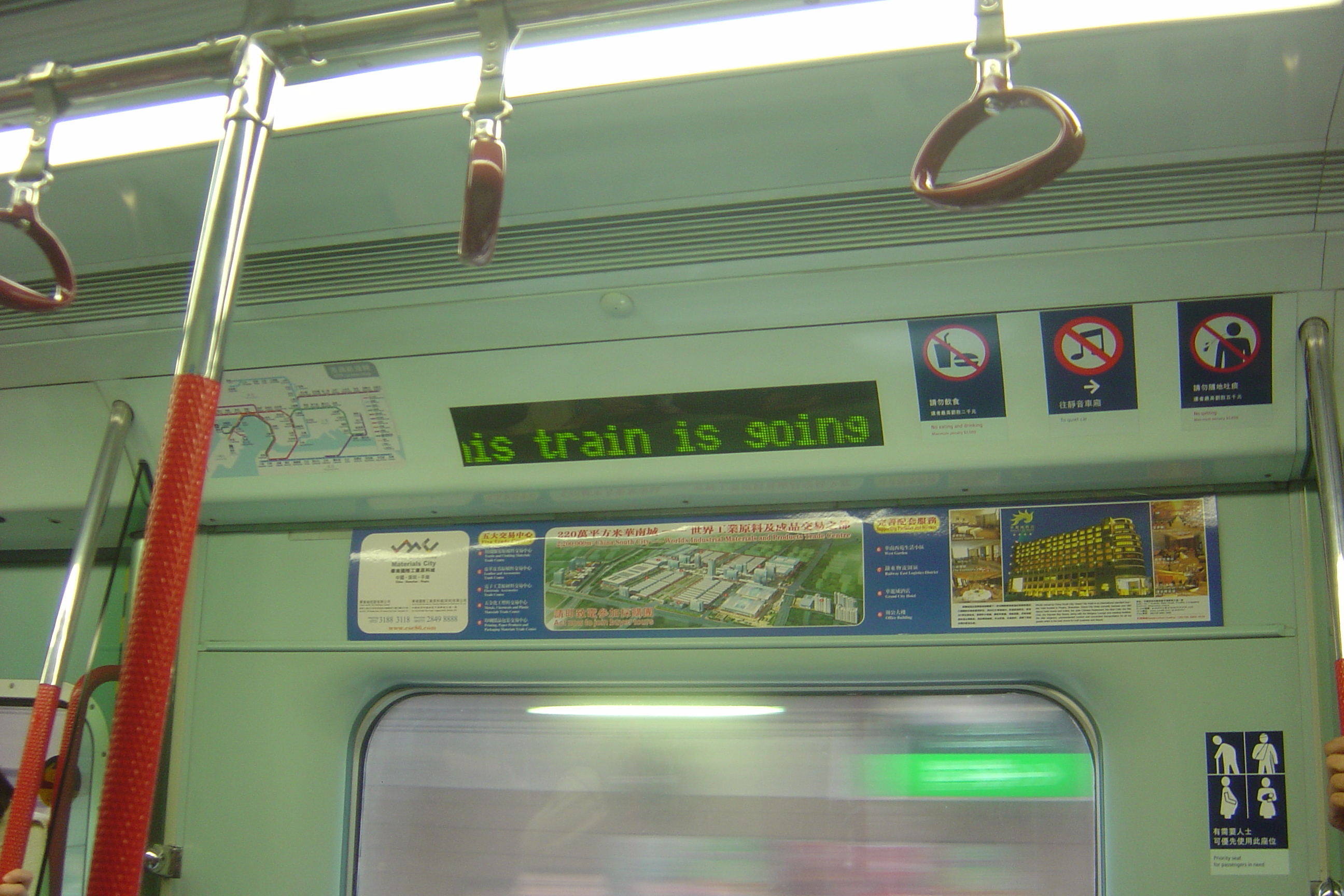
LED screen at top of window

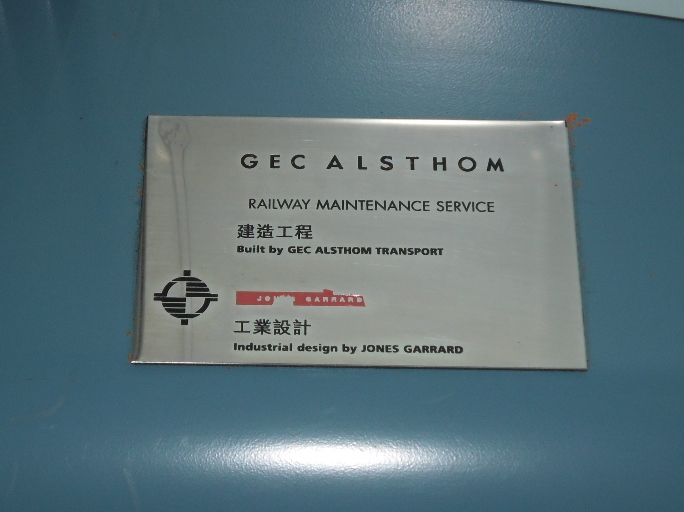
Refurbishment plaque

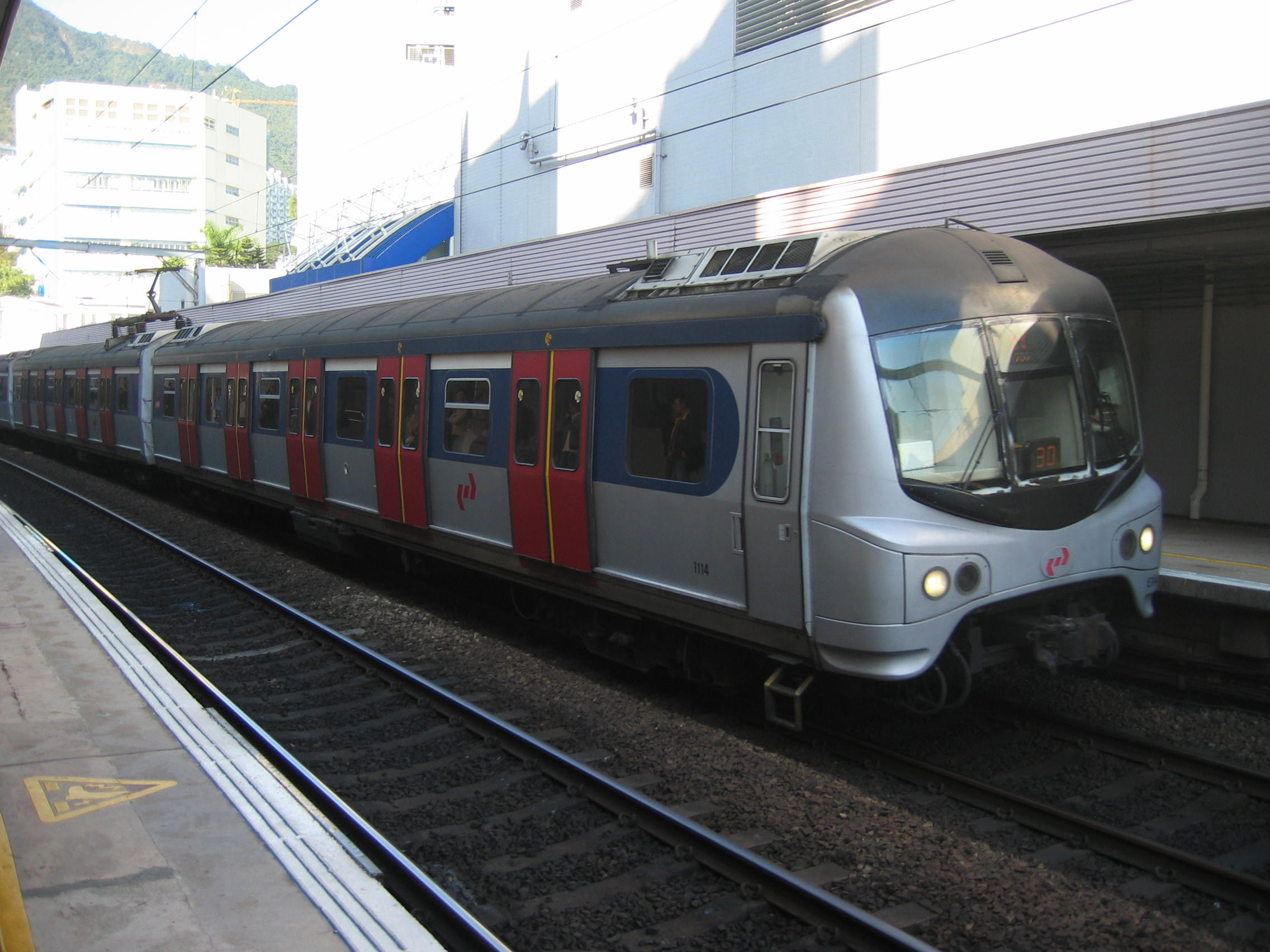
MLR E114 at Kowloon Tong station in 2006

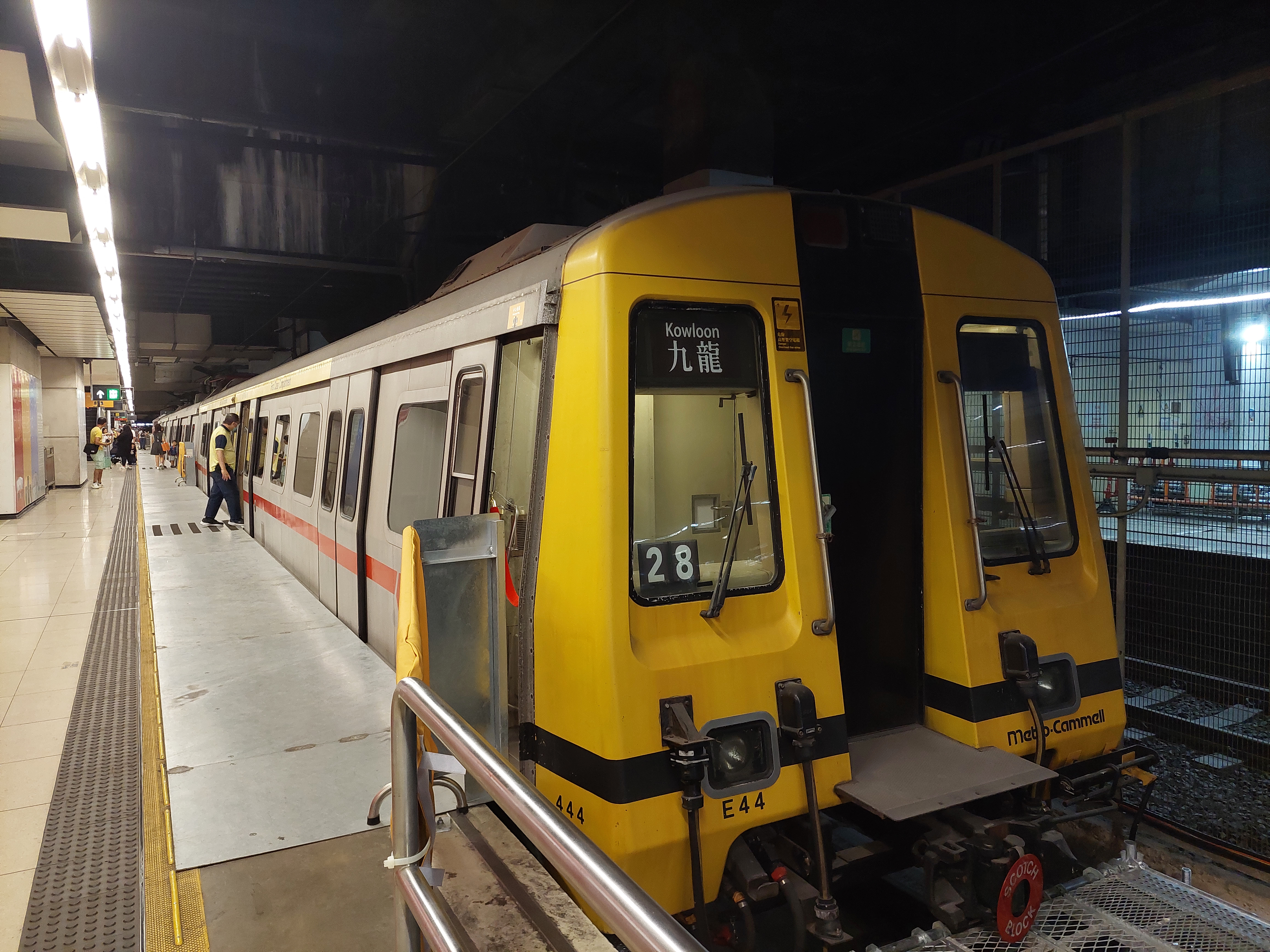
Unrefurbished E44 unit (144–244–444) at Hung Hom in 2024

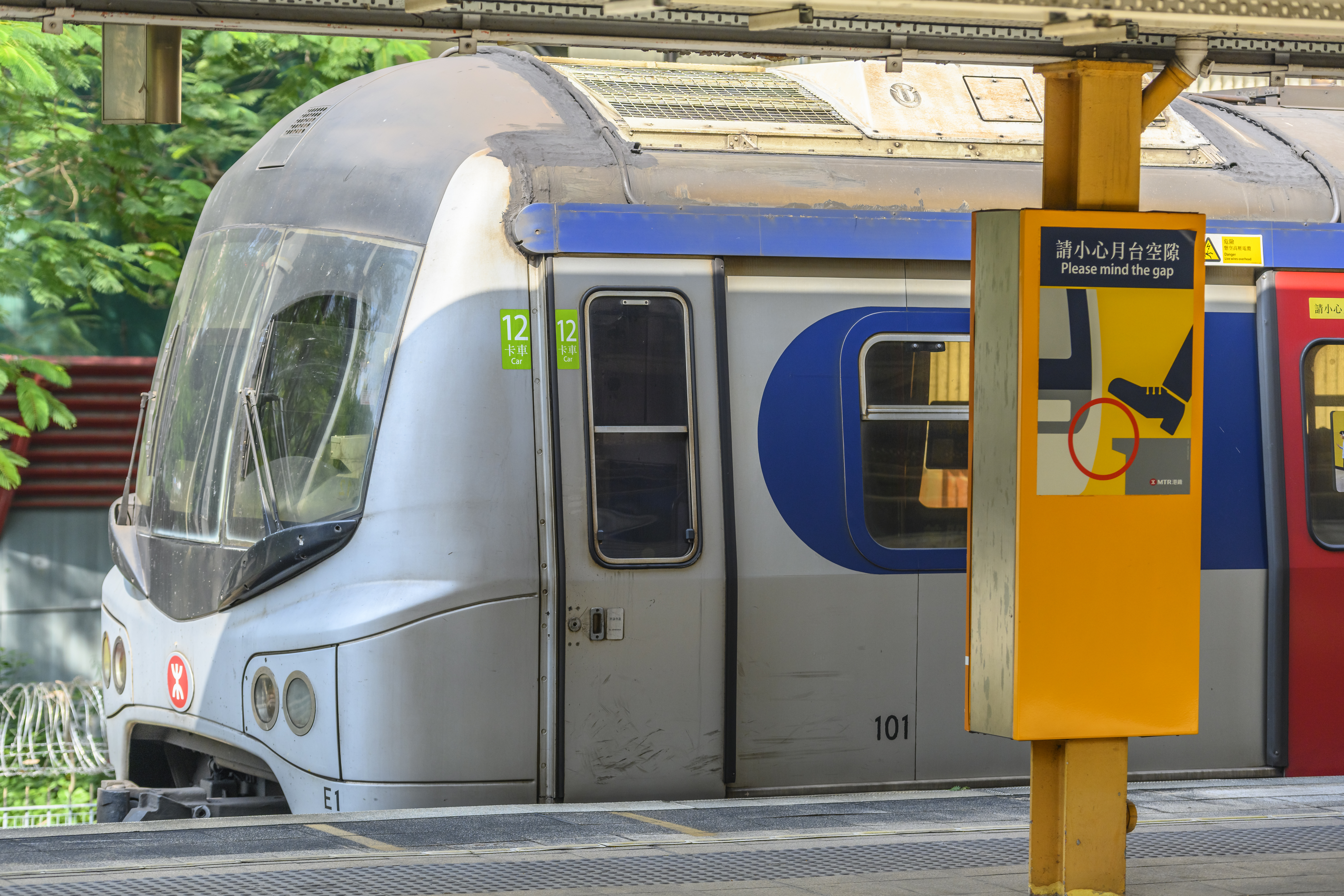
The first MLR train, E1 at Fo Tan Station in 2022

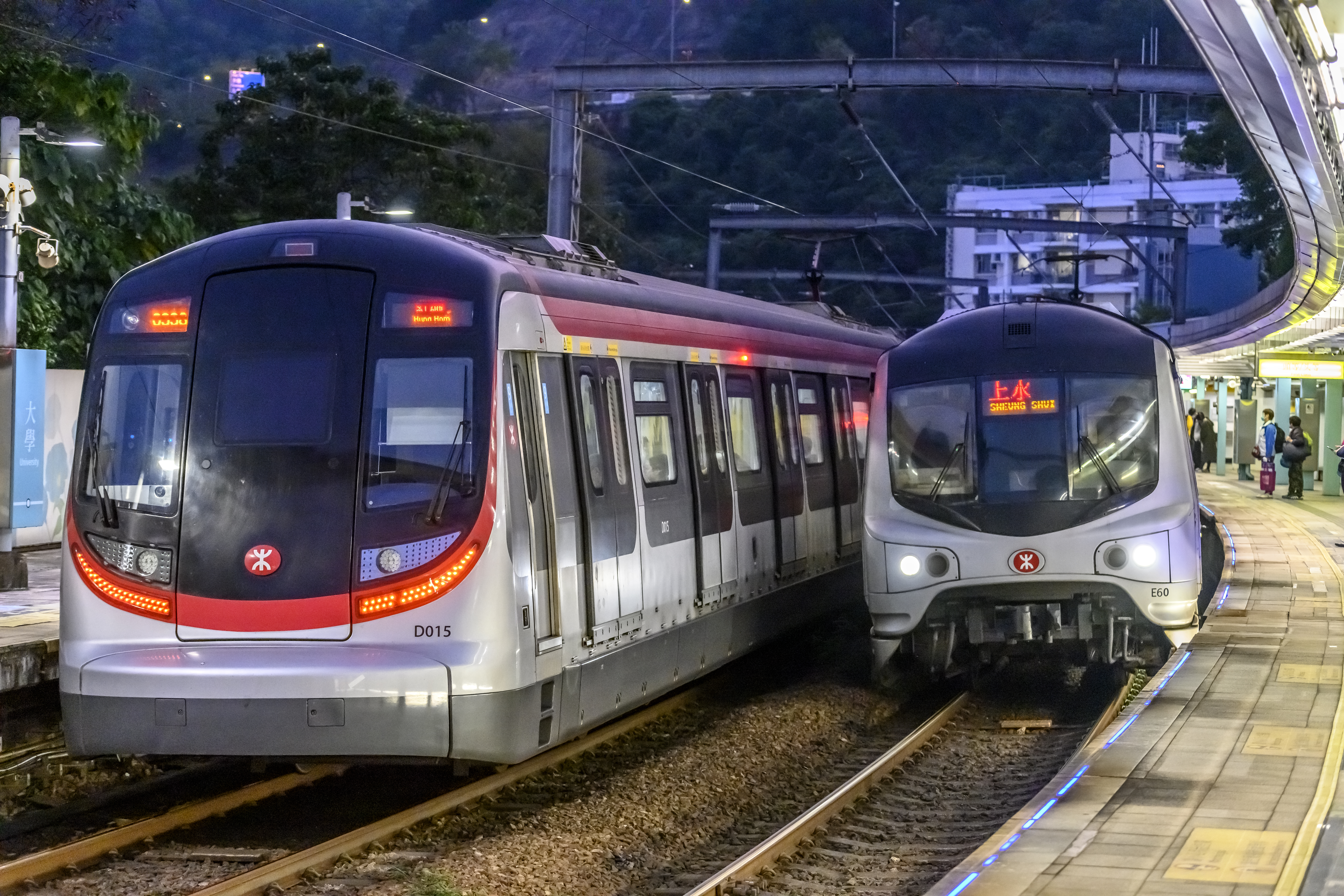
MTR Metro Cammell EMU (AC) seen next to its replacement, the Hyundai Rotem R-Train, at University Station in 2021

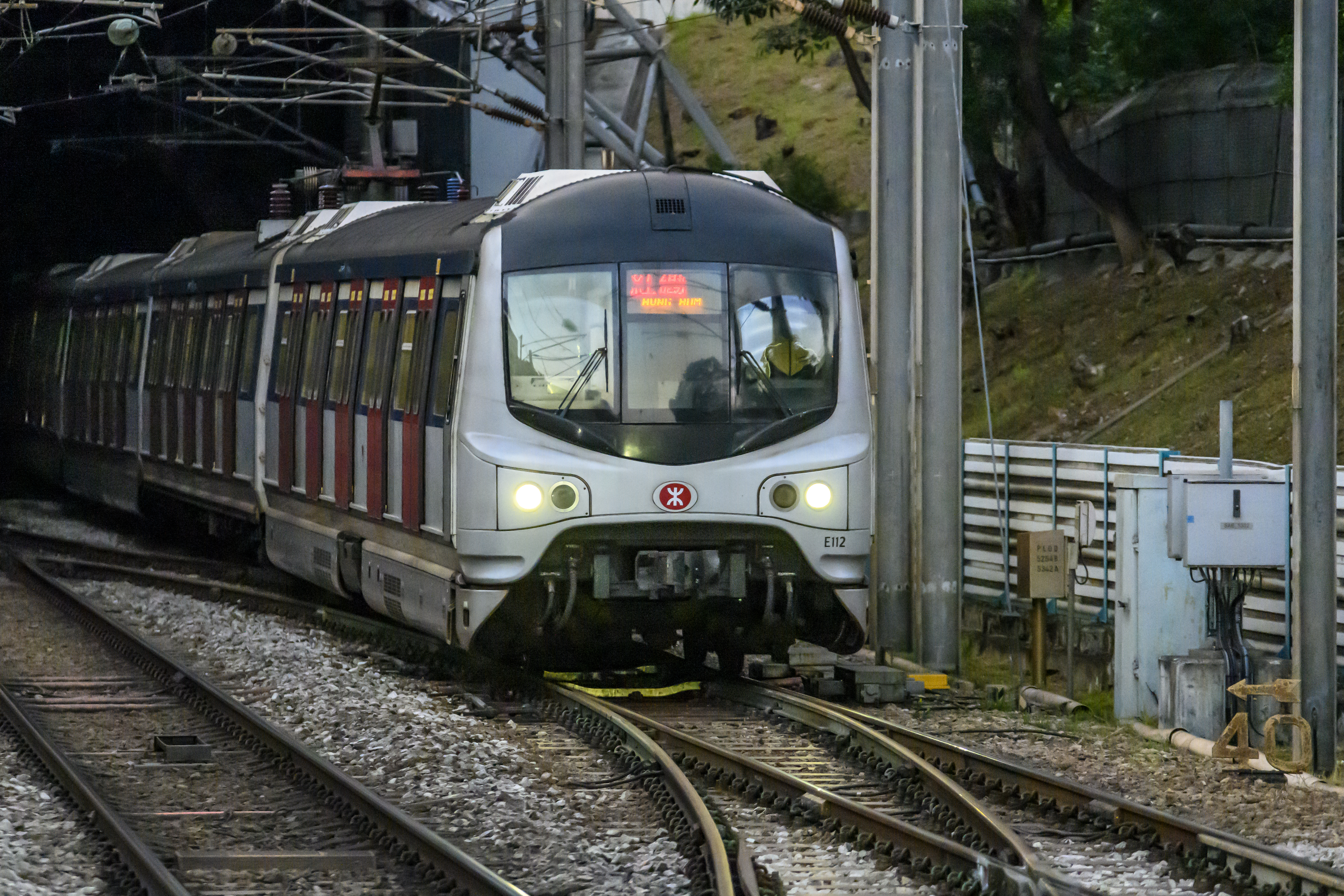
MTR Metro Cammell EMU (AC) exiting the Beacon Hill Tunnel and arriving at Kowloon Tong Station

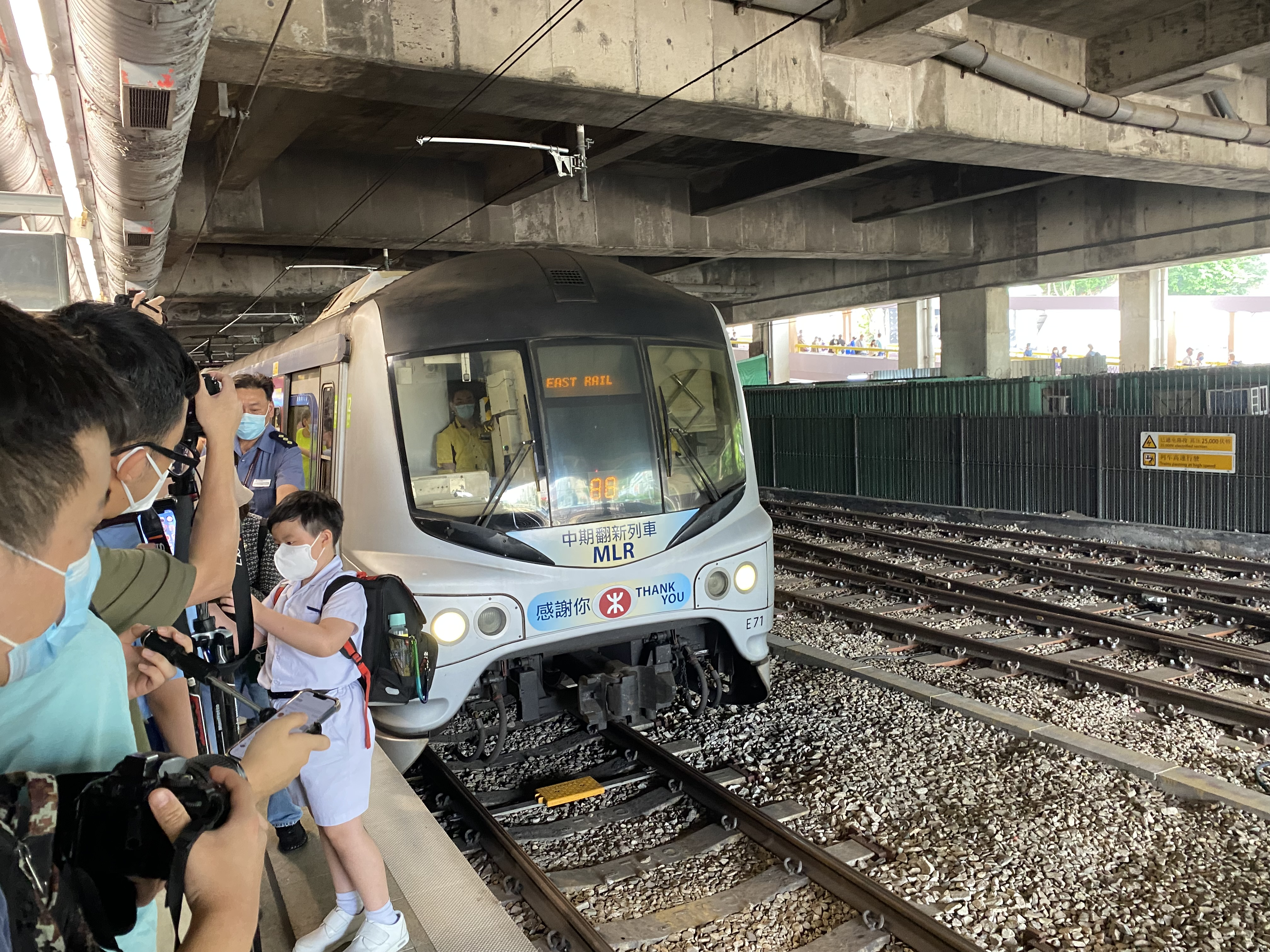
E71-E112 prepares to depart Sha Tin station for the final time on 6 May 2022

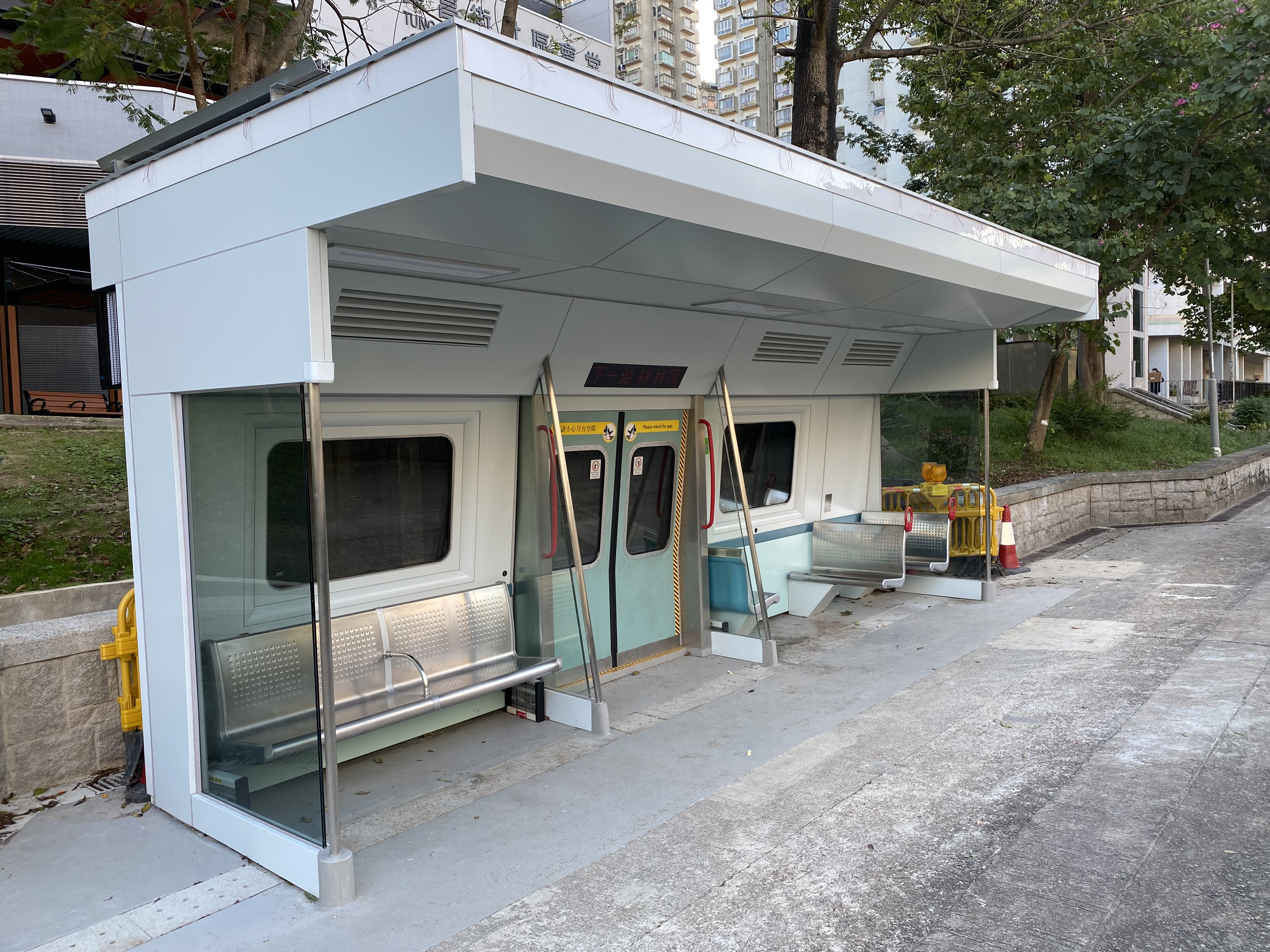
A shed made up of MLR parts in Tai Po

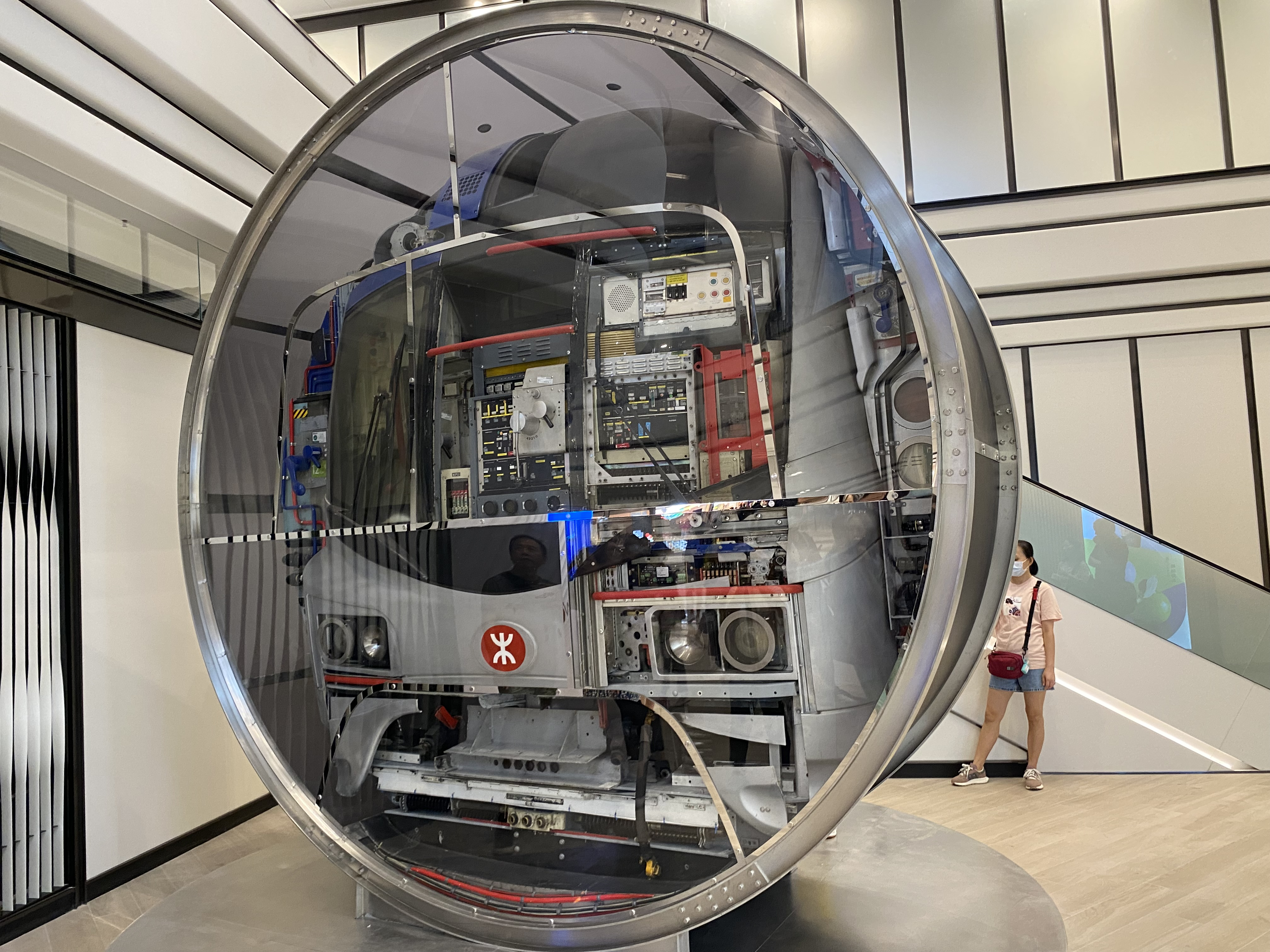
A collage made of MLR parts at The Wai

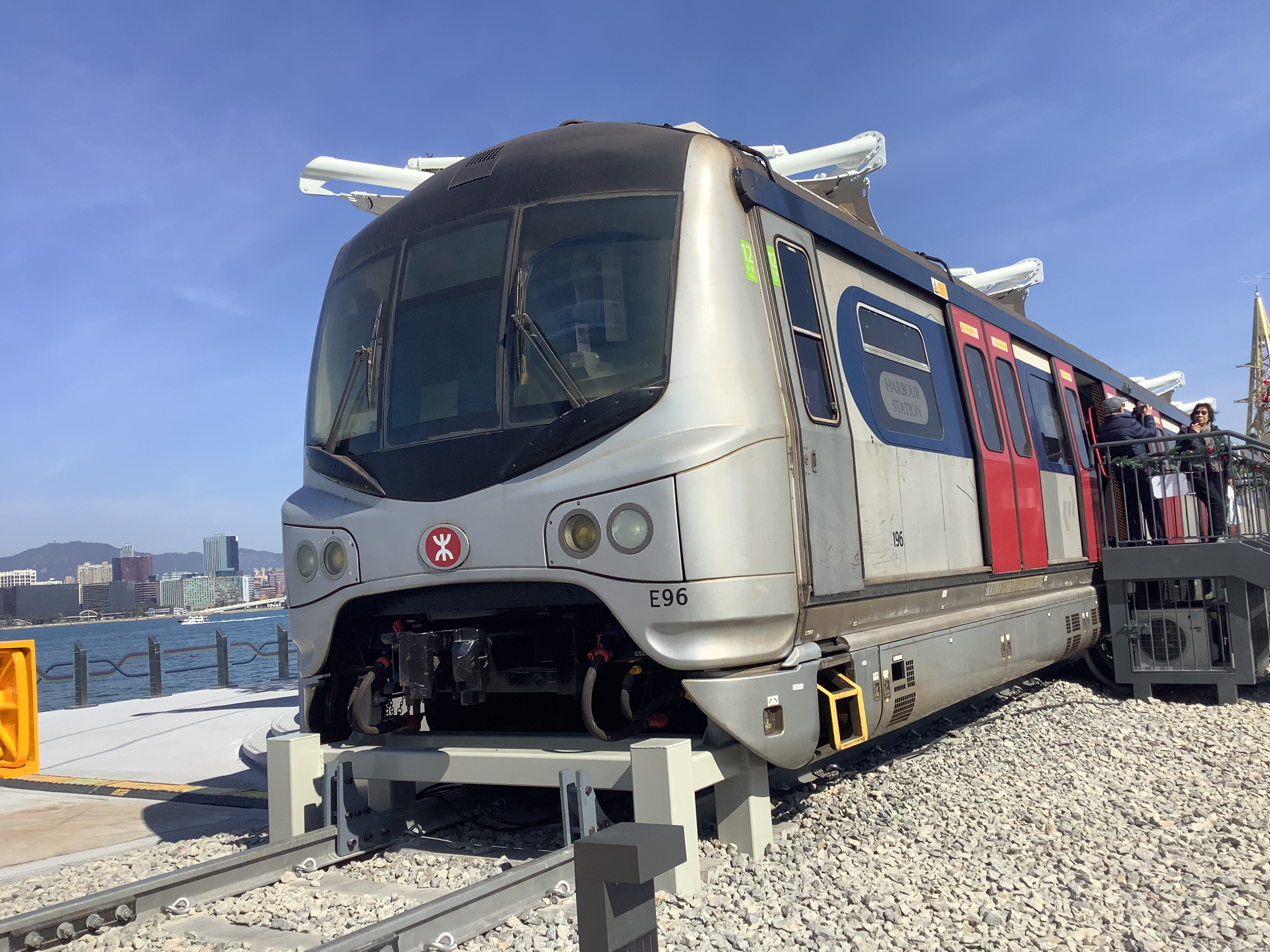
MLR train on display in Wan Chai

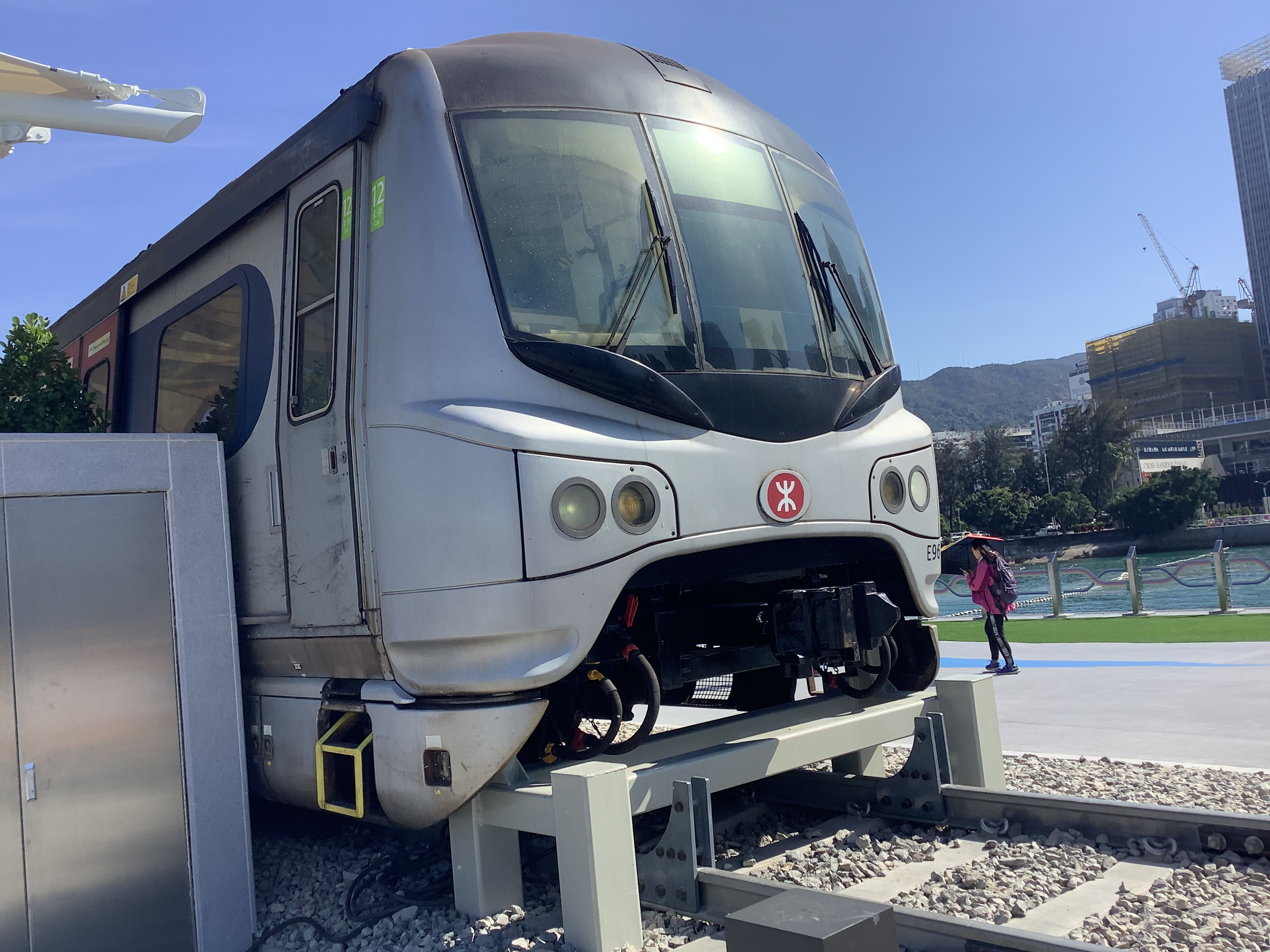
Platform Side of MLR carriage 196 in Wan Chai
