= Transmission balise-locomotive =

Belgian train protection system

Transmission balise-locomotive (Dutch: Transmissie Baken Locomotief; TBL; English: "Beacon-to-Locomotive Transmission") is a train protection system used in Belgium and (until 2021) on Hong Kong's East Rail line.

== Versions ==
=== TBL1 ===
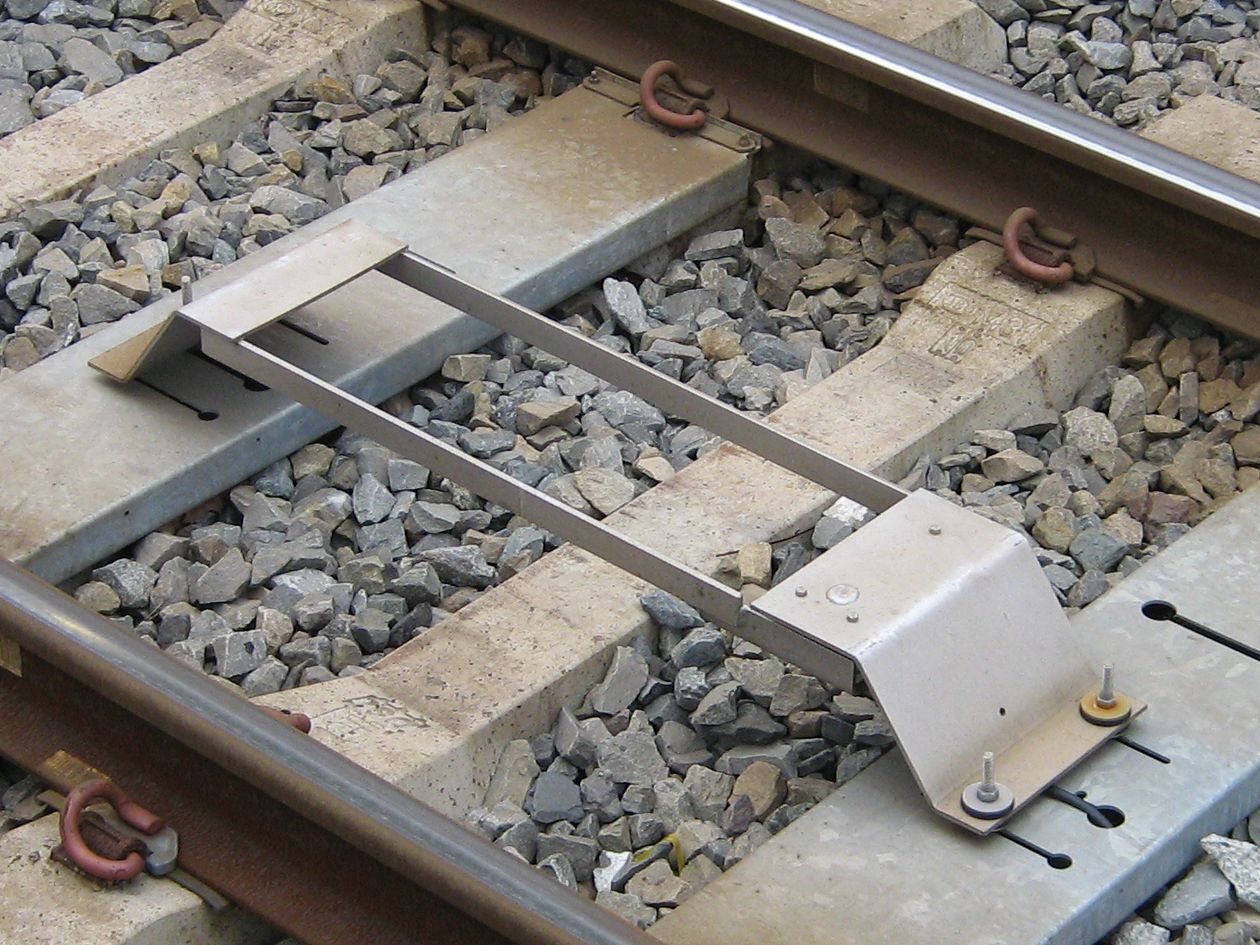
TBL1-balise

The TBL system is designed to stop a train passing a red signal, with operating speeds of up to 160 km/h. In 2006 13% of the Belgian train network used the original TBL system, introduced in 1982.

The system requires the train driver to manually acknowledge a warning when passing a double yellow signal (similar to the Memor/Le Crocodile system), as well as stopping a train automatically if it passes a red signal.

=== TBL1+ ===
TBL1+ began to be installed on the Belgian rail network in 2006, with full conversion to the system expected by 2012. The system is a development of TBL1, but uses Eurobalises, providing compatibility for later reconfiguration to an ETCS system. An additional safety measure is the addition of an additional balise 300m up-line, which forces an automatic stop on trains travelling at more than 40 km/h ahead of a red signal.

The roll-out of TBL1+ was accelerated after the Halle train collision on 15 February 2010, which killed 19 and injured 171 people. An upgraded version, TBL1++ was also unable to prevent the 2017 Leuven derailment while ETCS would have.

Similar to the Swiss EuroSignum approach, it simply converts the aspects from TBL1 into a digital transmission packet so that it is compatible with ETCS, while not interfering with ETCS functionality, by using the national datagram (packet number 44) that is defined in the ERTMS / ETCS specification requirements specification (subset 026).

=== TBL2/3 ===
The TBL2/3 system is nearly identical to the Dutch ATB-NG, and allows operating at speeds of up to 300 km/h. The system is used on the high speed line between Bierbeek (Leuven) and Ans (Liège).

All other high-speed lines will be equipped with ETCS level 2, as shown in the network statement published by Infrabel on its website. Line 4, linking Antwerp to the Dutch High Speed Line South, is equipped with both Level 2 and, as fallback, Level 1.

== Use elsewhere ==
The TBL system was installed for local trains on Hong Kong's East Rail line, a trunk line of the MTR network, in the late 1990s. It was intended as a replacement for the line's original Automatic Warning System (AWS), a British train protection system, so as to allow for increased traffic and capacity on the East Rail line. With the introduction of an automatic train operation (ATO) system supplied by Alstom in 2002 the said TBL system functioned as the safety-critical part of the said ATO system, and also served as a fallback in case the ATO system failed or was not available. Intercity through trains, which used the East Rail line within Hong Kong territory but do not stop, continued to operate with AWS until their discontinuation in 2022.

TBL began to be phased out in 2021 with the deployment of Trainguard MT, a communications-based train control (CBTC) signaling system, as part of the Sha Tin to Central Link upgrades. The changeover to CBTC, including the introduction of the R-Trains, faced several delays but eventually fully replaced the TBL system by the opening of the cross-harbour extension in 2022.

The ATP system installed on the Great Western Main Line in the United Kingdom is based on TBL.
