= Sha Tin to Central Link =

Heavy rail expansion project

Sha Tin to Central Link 沙田至中環線

Overview
- Owner: KCR Corporation
- Locale: Districts: Kowloon City, Yau Tsim Mong, Wan Chai, Central and Western
- Termini: Admiralty (Interchange of Island line, Tsuen Wan line and South Island line); Hung Hom (through service to West Rail line); Tai Wai (through service to Ma On Shan line)
- Stations: 7 (phase 1, Tuen Ma Line); 2 (phase 2, East Rail Line)

Service
- Type: Heavy rail
- System: MTR
- Operator: MTR Corporation
- Depot(s): Tai Wai, Hung Hom, Pat Heung
- Rolling stock: SP1900 EMU, Hyundai Rotem EMU, CRRC Changchun EMU

History
- Opened: Tuen Ma line: 14 February 2020 (Tai Wai — Kai Tak); 27 June 2021 (Kai Tak — Hung Hom); East Rail line: 15 May 2022 (Hung Hom — Admiralty)
- Closed: West Rail line: 27 June 2021

Technical
- Line length: 17 km (11 mi)
- Track gauge: 1,435 mm (4 ft 8 1/2 in) standard gauge
- Electrification: 25 kV 50 Hz AC

Sha Tin to Central Link
- Traditional Chinese: 沙田至中環線
- Simplified Chinese: 沙田至中环线
Transcriptions
Standard Mandarin
- Hanyu Pinyin: Shātián zhì Zhōnghuán Xiàn
Yue: Cantonese
- Jyutping: saa1 tin4 zi3 zung1 waan4 sin3

SCL
- Traditional Chinese: 沙中線
- Simplified Chinese: 沙中线
Transcriptions
Standard Mandarin
- Hanyu Pinyin: Shā Zhōng Xiàn
Yue: Cantonese
- Yale Romanization: sā jūng sin
- Jyutping: saa1 zung1 sin3

Timeline of the Sha Tin to Central Link
| Date | Event |
|---|---|
| 1960s | Predecessor East Kowloon line was proposed by British consultant Freeman, Fox, Wilbur Smith & Associates |
| 2000 | Sha Tin to Central Link first appeared in the government document Railway Development Strategy 2000 |
| 2002 | KCRC won its bid to build SCL, building an independent line from Tai Wai to Central West |
| 2005 | KCRC modified its 2002 plan, making East Kowloon portion of the line join Ma On Shan Rail at Tai Wai and West Rail at Hung Hom. The East Rail would extend to Central West; MTRC submitted a new proposal: extending Kwun Tong Line to Whampoa, and building a new independent line from Tai Wai to Central West (similar to KCRC 2002 plan) |
| 2006 | MTR–KCR merger was confirmed. Non-binding memorandum of understanding signed by government and MTRC. Yet, SCL would be built in accordance to KCRC 2005 plan, while Kwun Tong line extension would also be constructed |
| 2007 | MTR–KCR merger |
| 2008 | MTRC announced a revised proposal, fully funded by government |
| 2012 | Executive Council approved and construction began |
| 2015 | First rolling stock for East West line arrived in Hong Kong |
| 2016 | Kwun Tong line extension commence 11-kilometre tunnel of East West line was fully broken through |
| 2018 | Whistleblowing on poor construction quality at the Hung Hom station A Commission of Inquiry is appointed by Chief Executive of HKSAR government |
| 2019 | Commencement of whole SCL postponed SCL (Phase 1) split into Tuen Ma line First Phase and Second Phase due to construction quality of Hung Hom station. The name "Ma On Shan line" is made obsolete as it began operating as "Tuen Ma line phase 1". |
| 2021 | Tuen Ma line begins full operation. The name "West Rail line" is made obsolete as it was fully absorbed by Tuen Ma line. |
| 2022 | The East Rail Line extension begins full operations, and all Metro Cammell EMUs of it has retired. |

The Sha Tin to Central Link (abbreviated SCL; Chinese: 沙中線; Cantonese Yale: sā jūng sin) was an expansion project owned by the Kowloon-Canton Railway Corporation and operated by the MTR public transport network in Hong Kong. It was divided into two sections and expanded the network’s heavy rail lines.

The first section, named "Tuen Ma line (Phase 1)”, runs from Tai Wai station in the New Territories to Hung Hom station in Kowloon. The Tai Wai–Hung Hom segment connected the Ma On Shan line and West Rail line, forming the new Tuen Ma line. Operation of the Tai Wai to Kai Tak section began on 14 February 2020. The opening of the section from Kai Tak to Hung Hom was delayed and opened on 27 June 2021.

In anticipation of the Tuen Ma line, the existing Kwun Tong line was extended from its previous terminus at Yau Ma Tei to Whampoa station. This extension includes the new Ho Man Tin station to provide interchange with the Tuen Ma line. The Kwun Tong line extension was opened on 23 October 2016. While it was done in conjunction with the Sha Tin to Central Link, it is not considered a direct component of the project.

The second section (Phase 2) extended the East Rail line from Hung Hom in Kowloon to Admiralty on Hong Kong Island via a newly constructed station at Exhibition Centre. It opened on 15 May 2022.

== History ==
The proposed route of the Sha Tin to Central Link roughly follows the scheme of the original East Kowloon line, which was proposed in the late 1960s but was not constructed. The Shatin to Central Link was included as one of the Priority Railway Schemes in the Hong Kong government's Railway Development Strategy 2000.

On 25 June 2002, the government announced that the Kowloon-Canton Railway Corporation (KCRC) had won its bid against the MTR Corporation (MTRC) to build and operate the Shatin to Central Link. The route was originally planned to go from Tai Wai station to Central West station (proposed to be located under the Mid-Levels), as an extension of the then-under-construction KCR Ma On Shan Rail (now the Ma On Shan line).

The KCRC announced modifications to the proposal in 2005, with the East Kowloon portion of the line joining KCR Ma On Shan Rail at Tai Wai and KCR West Rail (now the West Rail line) at Hung Hom, with the cross-harbour portion joining KCR East Rail (now the East Rail line) at Hung Hom. Mong Kok Station (now Mong Kok East) would have been relocated, joining a new tunnel to a deeper Hung Hom station platform connecting to the cross-harbour section. Additionally, stations at Tsz Wan Shan and Whampoa Garden were removed from the proposal; the areas would instead have been served by people movers (APMs) from other stations. However, the KCRC's proposal had not yet been finalised.

At the same time, the MTRC submitted a new proposal to the government. According to the proposal, the Kwun Tong line would be extended from Yau Ma Tei station to Whampoa station (as the KCRC had decided to omit Whampoa Garden station from its proposal), and the route of the SCL would follow the KCRC's original proposal instead of the 2005 modified proposal. An underground train depot would have been built beneath the passenger terminal of the former Kai Tak International Airport, adjacent to Prince Edward Road East in Kowloon City; however, under the Kai Tak redevelopment plan released by the government in October 2006, the depot would have to be constructed somewhere else.

=== MTR–KCR merger plan ===
On 11 April 2006, MTRC signed a non-binding memorandum of understanding with the government of Hong Kong, the owner of KCRC, to merge the operations of the territory's two railway networks. According to the memorandum, the MTRC-owned MTR lines will be fully integrated with the Shatin to Central Link, which will be part of the MTR system. The government also intended to choose the KCRC's modified proposal to build the railway, that is, extending the current East Rail line to Hong Kong Island. However, final decisions were not made before conducting further studies on the proposal with the MTRC.

The new proposal was announced jointly by both companies on 12 July 2007, before the merger of the two rail networks on 2 December that year. Under this proposal, the depot for the Sha Tin to Central Link would have been built underneath the former Tai Hom Village site between Kai Tak and Diamond Hill stations. The people movers were omitted; Causeway Bay North station was also removed from the proposal due to potential adverse effects on road traffic during construction.

Stations of previous proposals
| KCRC proposal (2002) | KCRC revised proposal (2005) | MTRC proposal (2005) | KCRC–MTRC proposal (2007) |
|---|---|---|---|
| (to Ma On Shan Rail); Tai Wai; Tsz Wan Shan; Diamond Hill; Kai Tak; To Kwa Wan; Ma Tau Wai; Ho Man Tin; Whampoa Garden; Hung Hom; Exhibition; Admiralty; Central West | Ma On Shan Rail East Kowloon Extension: (to Ma On Shan Rail); Tai Wai; Diamond Hill (APM to Tsz Wan Shan); Kai Tak; To Kwa Wan / Ma Tau Wai; Ho Man Tin; Hung Hom (APM to Whampoa Garden); (to West Rail); East Rail Cross-harbour Extension: (to East Rail); Mong Kok (relocated); Hung Hom (relocated) (APM to Whampoa Garden); Causeway Bay North; Exhibition; Admiralty; Central West | Shatin to Central Link: Tai Wai; Tsz Wan Shan; Diamond Hill; Kai Tak; To Kwa Wan; Ma Tau Wai; Ho Man Tin; Hung Hom; Exhibition; Admiralty; Central West; Kwun Tong line extension: (to Kwun Tong line); Yau Ma Tei; Ho Man Tin; Whampoa | East–West line: (to Ma On Shan line); Tai Wai; Diamond Hill; Kai Tak; To Kwa Wan; Ma Tau Wai; Ho Man Tin; Hung Hom; (to West Rail line); North–South line: (to East Rail line); Hung Hom (relocated); Exhibition; Admiralty; Central South; Kwun Tong line extension: (to Kwun Tong line); Yau Ma Tei; Ho Man Tin; Whampoa |
| Legend | KCR East Rail; KCR West Rail; KCR Ma On Shan Rail; MTR Shatin to Central Link; MTR North-south line; MTR East-west line; MTR East Rail line; MTR Ma On Shan line; MTR West Rail line; MTR Kwun Tong line; MTR Tsuen Wan line; MTR Island line; MTR Tseung Kwan O line; MTR Tung Chung line; MTR Airport Express; MTR South Island line (East); MTR East Kowloon line; MTR Northern Link; MTR South Island line (West) | | |

The MTRC announced a revised proposal on 11 March 2008. The government would fund all of the required HK$37.4 billion for construction. The Executive Council approved the construction cost of HK$79.8 billion in March 2012 and construction began on 22 June 2012. Under the final proposal, the former Hung Hom Freight Yard adjacent to Hung Hom station will be converted into stabling sidings for Sha Tin to Central Link trains, and new access tracks will be constructed to link the Sha Tin to Central Link with the former Hung Hom Freight Yard. Central South station was excluded in the modified plan, as no suitable sites had been found. One station at Hin Keng (just south of Tai Wai) was added to the proposal afterwards, to alleviate congestion at Tai Wai station.

=== Expected commencement ===
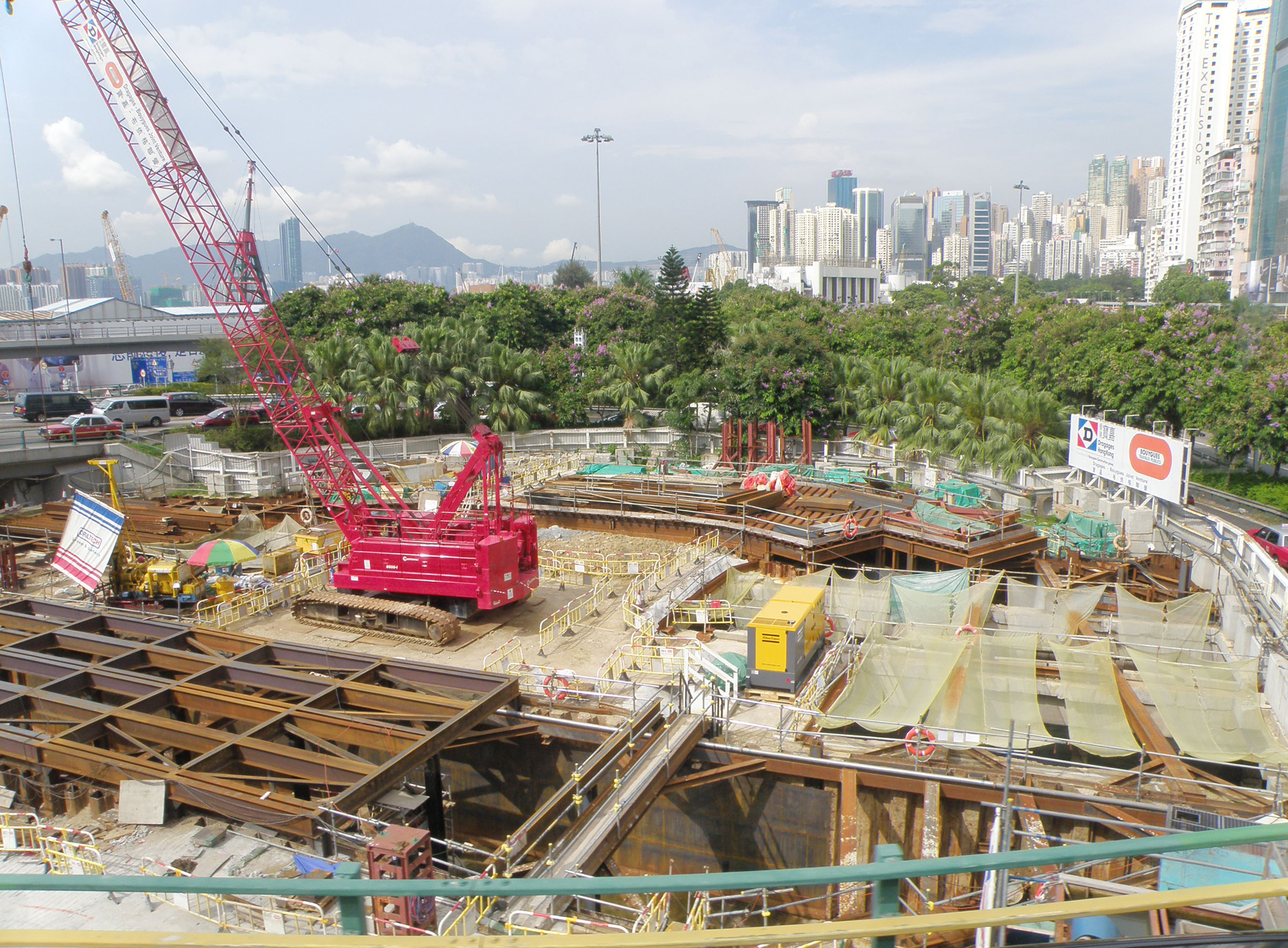
While heavy road traffic on the surface, train tunnel is building underneath at Causeway Bay section

The original commencement date of Phase 1 was 2018; Phase 2 was expected to be completed in 2020 or 2021. Some of the construction work of Phase 2 has followed the completion of Wan Chai Reclamation Phase 2 and Central–Wan Chai Bypass, as there are overlaps between station and tunnels. In November 2014, Secretary for Transport and Housing Anthony Cheung revealed that the project would be delayed by at least another 11 months, caused by archaeological Work at To Kwa Wan station (now renamed as Sung Wong Toi station), and extra enabling works at Exhibition Centre station for topside development. At that time, the authority submitted a document to the Legislative Council, stating Phases 1 and 2 would be completed in 2019 and 2021 respectively.

However, the opening was delayed again due to construction quality problems at Hung Hom station. In January 2020, Secretary for Transport & Housing Frank Chan announced the "Tuen Ma line Phase 1" would be open on 14 February 2020, the rest of the Tuen Ma line would open on 27 June 2021, and the MTR expects the opening of the East Rail line extensions by June or July 2022, but is subject to change.

On 3 May 2022, MTR officially announced that the East Rail Line extension would open on 15 May 2022.

=== Hung Hom station scandal ===
In 2018, a whistleblower leaked information to the Hong Kong media stating that the construction quality at the Hung Hom station was substandard. Namely, the threaded steel bars that were supposed to link to each other were cut so that they would fit into couplers without actually connecting to the full extent.

This raised concerns that the platform is not as strong as it was designed to be. Although initially denying the allegations, the MTR and the contractor Leighton Asia later confirmed them, and proposed a plan to open up the concrete at some areas of the stations to inspect the construction quality.

The investigation also revealed further incidents of substandard work and missing construction records. For example, 40% of Request for Inspection and Survey Checks forms for the northern approach tunnels are missing.

== Construction and facility enhancement ==
=== New railway lines and track ===
The 11-kilometre tunnel of the East-West Corridor was fully broken through in August 2016.

As of February 2017, construction and tunnel boring is underway for the sections between the Exhibition Centre station and Causeway Bay, and between Causeway Bay and Kowloon. MTRC has set up an Immersed Tube Tunnel Casting Yard at the site of the former Shek O Quarry at the south side of the Hong Kong Island to pre-assemble sections of the tunnel tubes, which will be then transported by sea and immersed in place. As June 2017, the first Immersed Tube Tunnel units was installed in Victoria Harbour, marking the beginning of constructing the fourth harbour-crossing railway tunnel in Hong Kong. 11 tube tunnel units in total will be constructed and placed for the harbour crossing section.

=== New signalling systems and station facilities ===
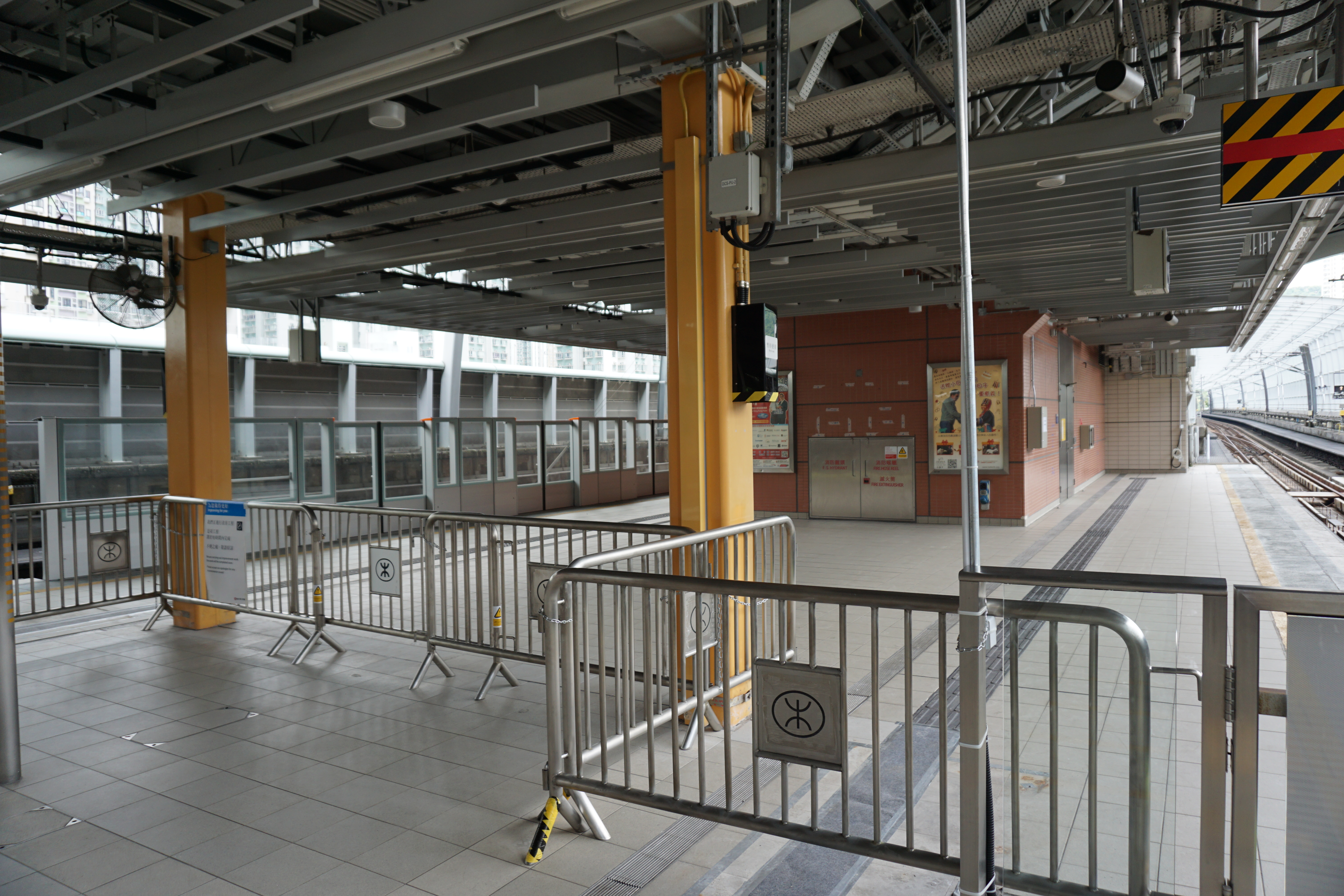
Expansion of City One platform with new platform gates, allowing 8-coach trains to stop

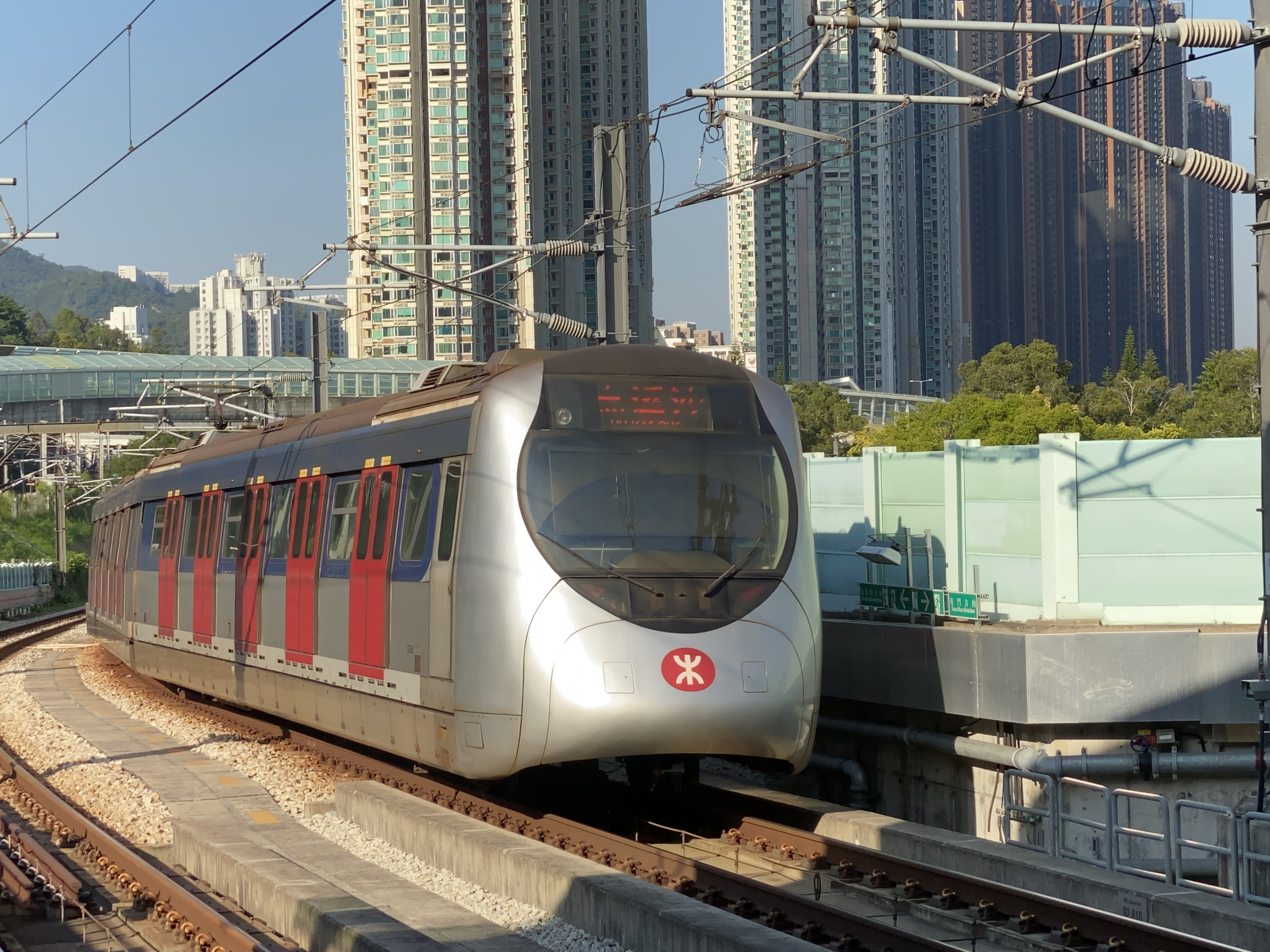
All existing SP1900 EMU trains were transferred to and now operated on the East West Corridor

Both of the new corridors will receive new signalling systems as part of the Sha Tin to Central Link project. The technology, known as communications-based train control (CBTC), will minimise train intervals while complying with existing and future infrastructure, such as platform doors/gates.

The East West Corridor are now using SelTrac CBTC supplied by Thales. This is an updated, more modern version of the Seltrac IS technology already installed on the West Rail line, Ma On Shan line, and Kowloon Southern Link. New on-board computers are being retrofitted to the existing SP1900 trains as part of their modifications to form 8-car trains, supplemented with newly acquired 8-car trains delivered with the new computer already installed. All stations on the Ma On Shan line have also received half-height platform gates in conjunction with the upgrade, and new underground stations will have full-height platform doors installed.

The North South Corridor will have the TBL train protection and Alstom's ATO system in use on the current East Rail line including the Lok Ma Chau Spur Line replaced with Trainguard MT CBTC supplied by Siemens. (AWS used by intercity trains on the East Rail line is not expected to be affected.) At the same time, all platforms would be modified and equipped with half-height platform gates (full-height doors on the new underground stations) to provide level boarding and minimize the gap with the train. Refurbishment and expansion work on platforms and stations will also be carried out.

Admiralty, Diamond Hill and Hung Hom stations, all of which are major interchanges following full opening of the new lines, have been expanded or relocated to cater to increased demand.

=== New rolling stock ===
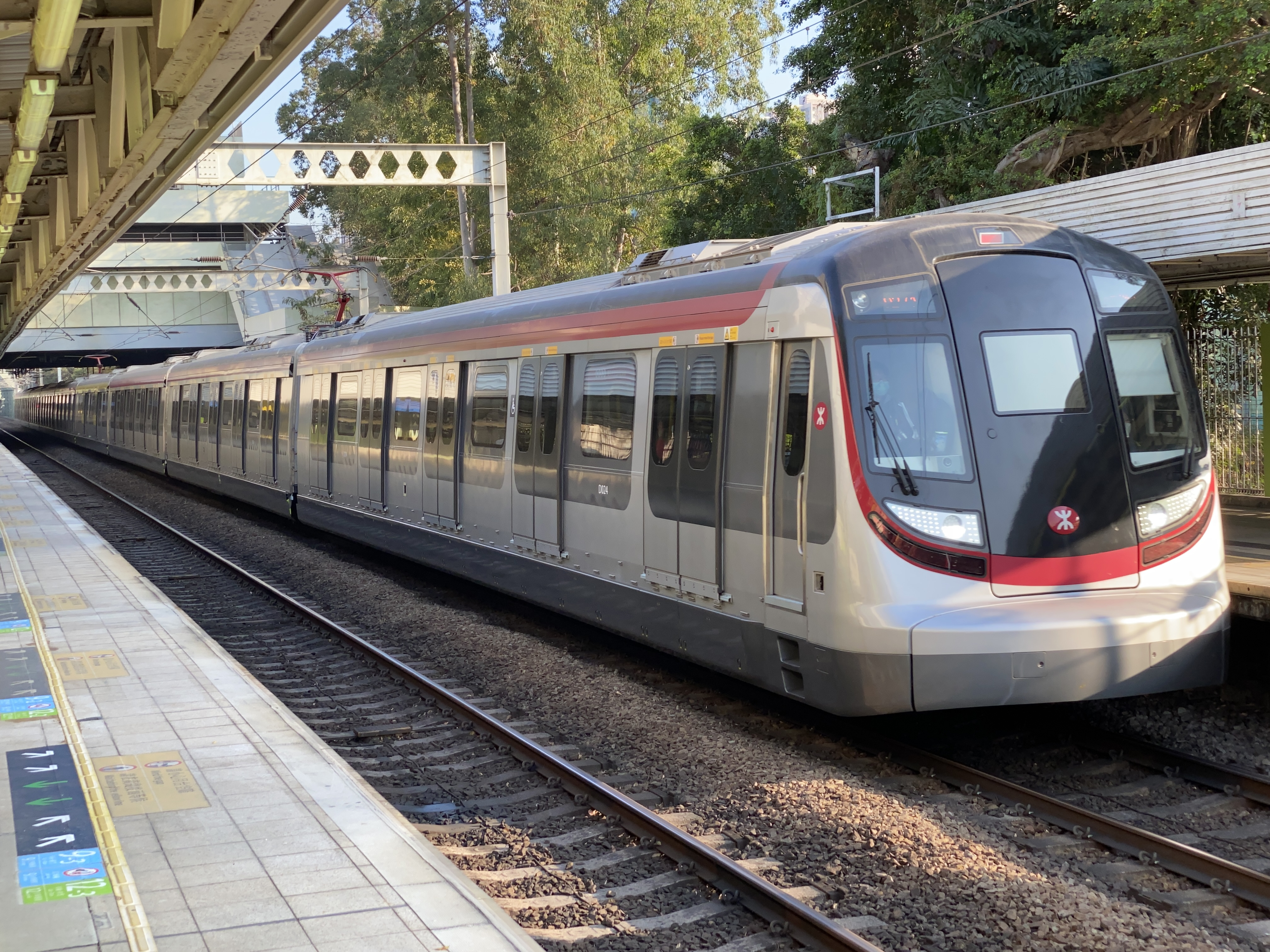
The R-train operates on the North South Corridor,

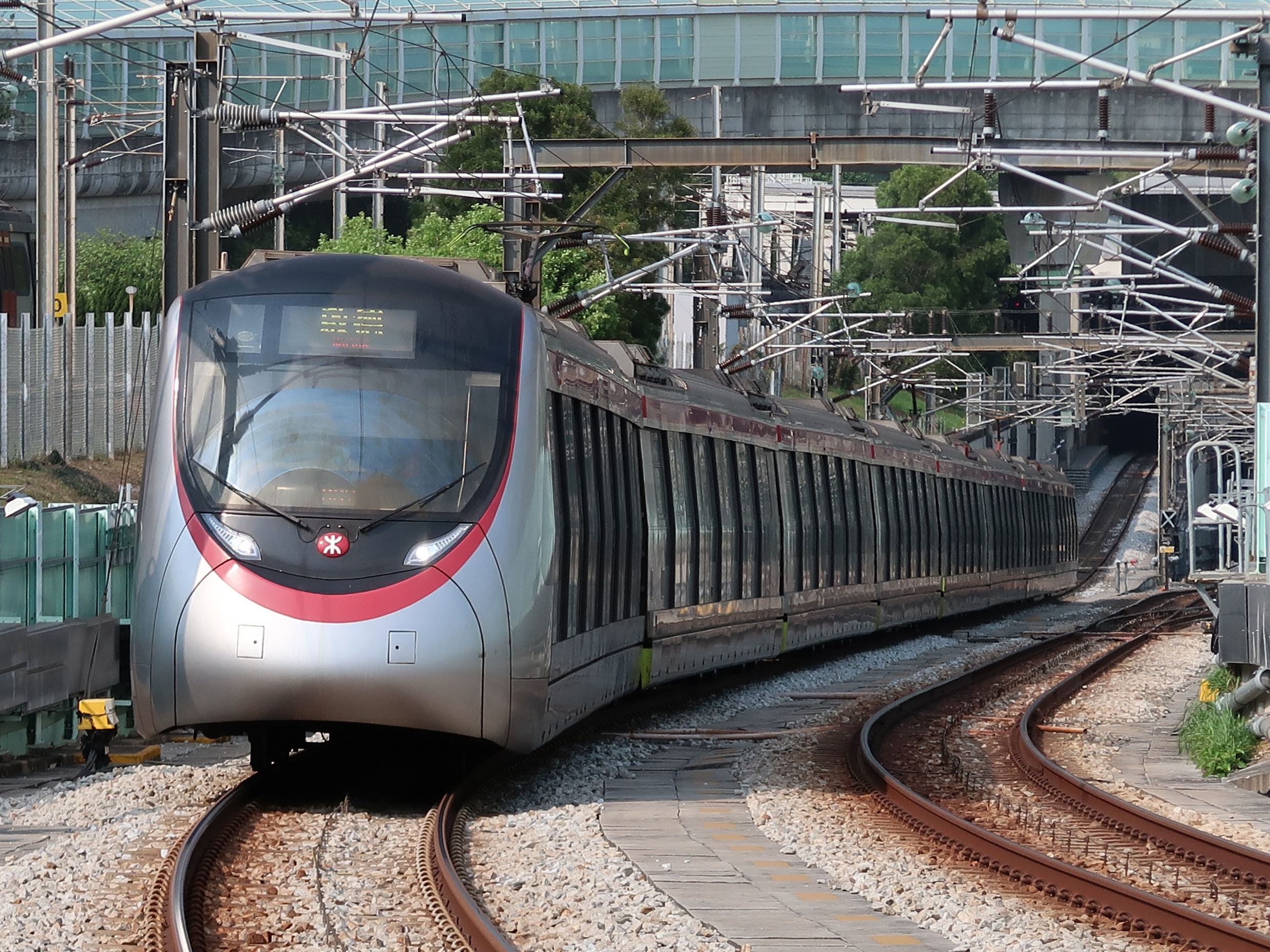
While the TML C-train operates on the East West Corridor.

The East West Corridor will operate using a combination of both new and existing rolling stock, while the North South Corridor will have its existing rolling stock fully replaced with new stock.

- Contract 1141A for 17 8-car C-Trains for the East West Corridor was awarded to CRRC Changchun Railway Vehicles in December 2013. Designed in 14 months, the first train, officially named East West Line Train, arrived in Hong Kong in June 2016 and began passenger service on the Ma On Shan Line on 12 March 2017.
- Contract 1141B for 37 9-car R-trains for the North South Corridor was awarded to Hyundai Rotem of South Korea in December 2012. The first delivery took place in 2015 with all new trainsets in service by 2020, fully replacing the 12-car Metro Cammell EMUs which were already retired.
- Contract 1151 for 36 additional SP1900 cars was awarded to Kinki Sharyo of Japan in January 2014. They are being used to convert all SP1900 trains into 8-car formations to serve the East West Corridor. Previously, they have operated in 4, 7, and 12-car formations on the existing lines.

=== New community facilities ===
Tsz Wan Shan station was removed from the 2007 final proposal due to its depth. Because of this, pedestrian facilities with lifts, travellers and covered walkways will be built for the Tsz Wan Shan community, connecting with Diamond Hill station.

On Hong Kong Island, Wan Chai Swimming Pool and Harbour Road Sports Centre were both re-provisioned on alternate sites, as the original buildings were demolished to make way for Exhibition Centre station.

Hongkong Post's International Mail Centre in Hung Hom was also demolished to make way for the line. It was rebuilt in Kowloon Bay and renamed the Central Mail Centre.

== Route ==
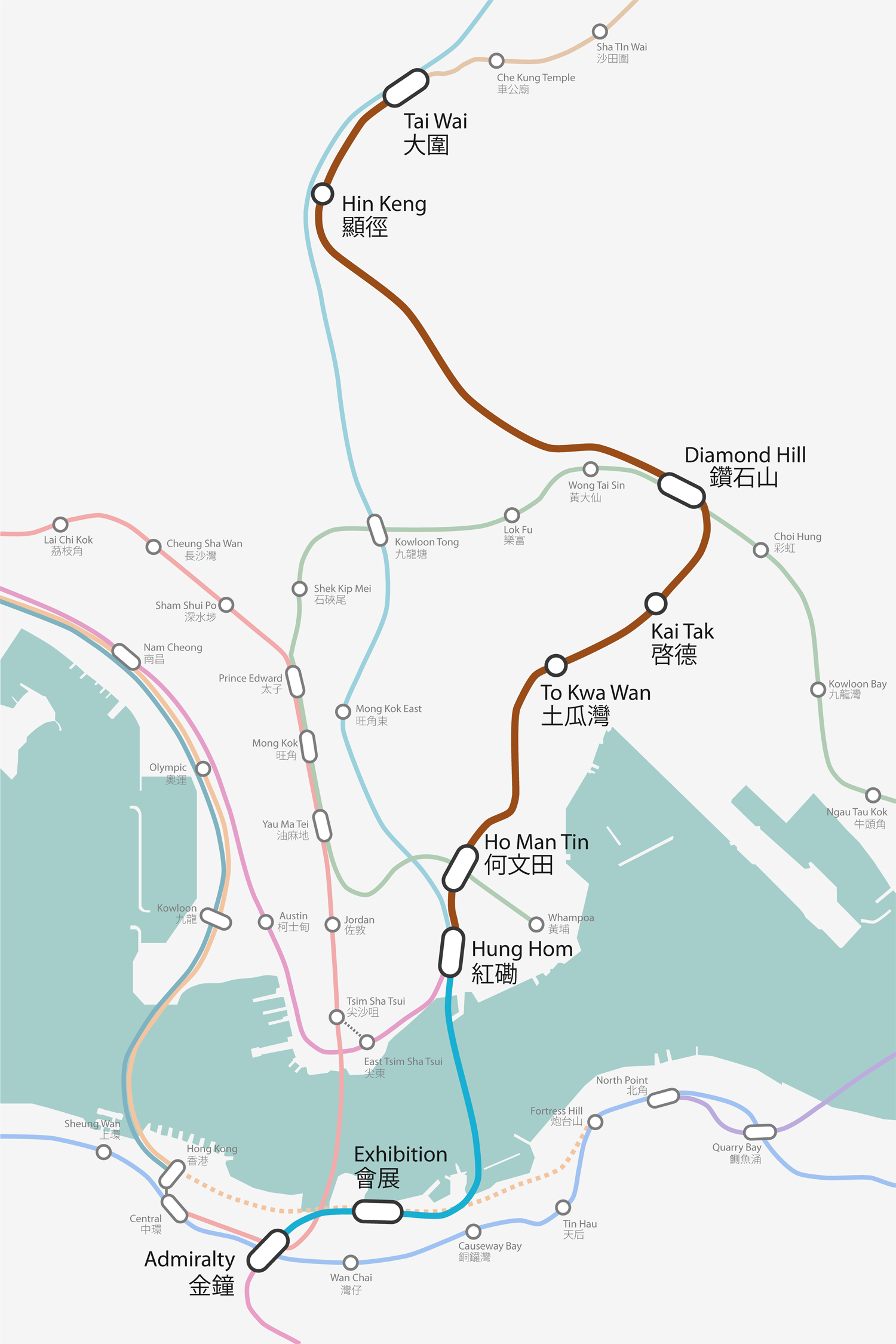
The route of the Sha Tin to Central Link, per the 2008 revised proposal

From the preexisting Ma On Shan line at Tai Wai station, the Tuen Ma line will continue southwards on an embankment to Hin Keng station, and then head southeast in tunnel towards Kowloon. After Diamond Hill station, the line will turn southwest and continue in tunnel through Ma Tau Chung and To Kwa Wan towards Hung Hom station, interchanging with the Kwun Tong line extension at Ho Man Tin along the way. At Hung Hom, the East West Corridor will connect to the preexisting West Rail line just south of its new platforms at the station and interchange with the East Rail line.

The East Rail line extension will connect to the East Rail line north of Hung Hom station, adjacent to the southern portal of the tunnel under Princess Margaret Road (Tunnel 1A); and will enter a tunnel to new platforms at Hung Hom station, interchanging with the Tuen Ma line. The line will then traverse under Victoria Harbour, through an immersed tube tunnel (Contract 1121), largely parallel to the Cross-Harbour Tunnel to its west, and then continue in tunnel westwards from the New Causeway Bay Typhoon Shelter to Exhibition Centre and Admiralty stations.

The Kwun Tong line extension, an associated project completed in late 2016, is a southeast extension of the Kwun Tong line from Yau Ma Tei station to Ho Man Tin station, where there will be an interchange to the Tuen Ma line. The line then continues under Wuhu Street and Tak on Street to a single dead-end platform at Whampoa station.

== Stations ==
| Livery and name | District | Connections | Opening date |
Tuen Ma line
↑ Tuen Ma line to Wu Kai Sha
| Kai Tak | Kowloon City | | 14 February 2020 |
| Sung Wong Toi | Kowloon City | | 27 June 2021 |
| To Kwa Wan | Kowloon City | | 27 June 2021 |
| Ho Man Tin | Kowloon City | Kwun Tong line | 23 October 2016 |
| Hung Hom | Yau Tsim Mong | East Rail line Through Train services to Mainland China | 30 November 1975 (Note: Originally opened as part of the East Rail line (then the KCR British Section).) relocated on 20 June 2021 |
↓ Tuen Ma line to Tuen Mun
East Rail line extension
↑ East Rail line to Lo Wu or Lok Ma Chau
| Hung Hom | Yau Tsim Mong | Tuen Ma line Through Train services to Mainland China | 30 November 1975 relocated on 15 May 2022 |
| Exhibition Centre | Wan Chai | Tseung Kwan O line (North Island line; under planning) | 15 May 2022 |
| Admiralty | Central and Western | Island line, Tsuen Wan line and South Island line | 12 February 1980 |
Kwun Tong line extension
↑ Kwun Tong line to Tiu Keng Leng
| Yau Ma Tei | Yau Tsim Mong | Tsuen Wan line | 31 December 1979 |
| Ho Man Tin | Kowloon City | Tuen Ma line | 23 October 2016 |
| Whampoa | Kowloon City | | 23 October 2016 |

=== Naming ===
Initially, Sung Wong Toi station was named To Kwa Wan station, and To Kwa Wan station was named Ma Tau Wai station. This naming arrangement was met with dissatisfaction from the nearby community, as geographically, the former To Kwa Wan station was not considered part of To Kwa Wan. As a result, MTR made adjustments to the naming, which was announced during the 2017 Panel on Transport of the Legislative Council.
