= Central South =

Central South may refer to

Transport

- Central South station, proposed Mass Transit Railway station in Hong Kong
- Central South African Railways

Geography

- Mainland Southeast Asia, sometimes called "Middle South Peninsula" (中南半島) or "Indo-china"
- South Central China, or literally "Central South" (中南) in Chinese, a region of the People's Republic of China containing Central China and South China
- Zanzibar Central/South Region, Tanzania
- Central South Philadelphia, Philadelphia, Pennsylvania, United States
- Central South, England refers to Southampton, Portsmouth, and BCP conurbation on the south coast.

Other

- Central Independent Television, successor of Central South, television station in Midlands, United Kingdom
- Central South University, university in Changsha, Hunan, People's Republic of China
- Multinational Division Central-South, part of the Multinational Force Iraq

== See also ==
- South Central (disambiguation)
