= West Central Conference =

West Central Conference may refer to:

- West Central Conference (Illinois)
- West Central Conference (Indiana)
- West Central Activities Conference (Iowa)
- West Central Conference (Minnesota)

== See also ==
- Western Conference (disambiguation)
- North Central Conference (disambiguation)
- West Central (disambiguation)
