= Central Division =

Central Division may refer to:

== Sports ==
- Central Division (NBA), one of the six divisions in the National Basketball Association
- Central Division (NHL), one of the four divisions in the National Hockey League
- Central Division (MLS), former division in the MLS
- Pacific Division (AFL), one of the four divisions in the Arena Football League and formerly called the Central Division
- American League Central, division in Major League Baseball's American League
- National League Central, division in Major League Baseball's National League
- Queensland Rugby League Central Division, division in the Queensland Rugby League
- AFC North, National Football League division formerly known as "AFC Central"
- NFC North, National Football League division formerly known as "NFC Central"
- Central Division (cricket), a division of Minor League Cricket

== Places ==
- Central District (Bandar Abbas County), Hormozgan Province, Iran
- Central Division, Fiji, one of Fiji's four provincial divisions
- Division of the Los Angeles Police Department#Central Division
- Central Land Division, a former cadastral division of Western Australia
- Kampala Central Division
- Quilon Division (Travancore), also known as Central Division, an administrative subdivision of the former princely state of Travancore

== Other ==
- Central Division (NS), a unit of Norfolk Southern Railway
- Central Division (web series), Internet series set in the downtown precinct of the LAPD

== See also ==
- Eastern Division (disambiguation)
- Northern Division (disambiguation)
- Southern Division (disambiguation)
- Western Division (disambiguation)
