= Eastern Division =

Eastern Division or East Division may refer to:

== Military ==
- 12th (Eastern) Division, was a division raised by the British Army during the First World War
- 12th (Eastern) Infantry Division, was a division raised by the British Army during the Second World War
- 18th (Eastern) Division, was a division raised by the British Army during the First World War

== Places ==
- Eastern Division, Fiji
- Eastern Division (New South Wales)
- Eastern Land Division, a cadastral division of Western Australia

== Sports ==
- East Division (AFL), a division of the Arena Football League
- East Division (CFL), a division of the Canadian Football League
- East Division (NHL), a division of the National Hockey League
- AFC East, a division of the American Football Conference
- American League East, a division of Major League Baseball
- National League East, a division of Major League Baseball
- NFC East, a division of the National Football Conference
- Eastern Division of the Southeastern Conference
- Eastern Division (cricket), a division of Minor League Cricket

== Other uses ==
- BMT Eastern Division of the New York City Subway
- East Division High School, Milwaukee, Wisconsin, United States

== See also ==
- Eastern Conference (disambiguation)
- Central Division (disambiguation)
- Northern Division (disambiguation)
- Southern Division (disambiguation)
- Western Division (disambiguation)
- Division (disambiguation)
- Eastern (disambiguation)
- East (disambiguation)
