= Western Division =

Western Division or West Division may refer to:

== Locations ==
- Western Division (The Gambia)
- Western Division, Fiji
- West Division (Northern Ireland)
- Western Division (New South Wales)
- West Division, Western Australia

== Units ==
- 13th (Western) Division (United Kingdom)
- 19th (Western) Division (United Kingdom)
- Western Rifle Division

== Sport ==
- Western Division (AFL)
- West Division (CFL), a division of the Canadian Football League
- West Division (NHL)
- American League Western Division
- National League Western Division
- AFC West Division
- NFC West Division
- West Division of the Mid-American Conference
- West Division of the Southeastern Conference
- Western Division (cricket), a division of Minor League Cricket

== See also ==
- Western Conference (disambiguation)
- Central Division (disambiguation)
- Eastern Division (disambiguation)
- Northern Division (disambiguation)
- Southern Division (disambiguation)
- Division (disambiguation)
- Western (disambiguation)
- West (disambiguation)
