= Kwun Tong line extension =

Railway line in Hong Kong

Kwun Tong line extension 觀塘綫延綫

Overview
- Owner: Hong Kong Government
- Locale: Districts: Kowloon City, Yau Tsim Mong
- Termini: Yau Ma Tei (through service to Kwun Tong line); Whampoa
- Stations: 2

Service
- Type: Heavy rail
- System: MTR
- Operator(s): MTR Corporation
- Depot(s): Kowloon Bay
- Rolling stock: MTR Metro Cammell EMU (DC), MTR CNR Changchun EMU

History
- Opened: 23 October 2016; 8 years ago

Technical
- Line length: 2.6 km (1.6 mi)
- Track gauge: 1,435 mm (4 ft 8 1/2 in)
- Electrification: 1.5 kV DC

The Kwun Tong line extension (abbreviated KTE; Chinese: 觀塘綫延綫; Jyutping: Gun1 Tong4 Sin3 Jin4 Sin3) is an extension of the MTR rapid transit network in Hong Kong. It extends the existing train service of Kwun Tong line to Ho Man Tin station and Whampoa station. Construction started on 25 July 2011 and opened for service on 23 October 2016.

== History ==
During the bid for Sha Tin to Central Link (SCL) in 2000s, in order to win the project, Mass Transit Railway proposed to extend the Kwun Tong line while Kowloon–Canton Railway suggest to construct an Automated People Mover in Whampoa.

After the MTR–KCR merger in 2007, Hong Kong government appointed MTR to construct the SCL according to KCR proposal, while also extending the Kwun Tong line to Whampoa. The benefits are better transfer arrangement at Ho Man Tin station and other SCL interchange stations.

== Stations ==
- Ho Man Tin
- Whampoa

Notes

- During peak hours, half of the Kwun Tong line trains terminate at Ho Man Tin, another half terminates at Whampoa. Passengers who head for Whampoa but take the wrong train to Ho Man Tin will need to change to the next train at Ho Man Tin. In off peak hours, all Kwun Tong line trains terminate at Whampoa.
