= South Division Two =

South Division Two may refer to:

- South Division Two (shinty), a Scottish men's shinty division
- WCA South Division Two, a Scottish women's shinty division

== See also ==
- South Division (disambiguation)
- South Division One (disambiguation)
