= South Division One =

South Division One may refer to:

- South Division One (shinty), a Scottish men's shinty division
- NIHL South Division 1, an English men's ice hockey division

== See also ==
- South Division (disambiguation)
- South Division Two (disambiguation)
