= South Central Conference =

South Central Conference may refer to:

- South Central Athletic Conference, college athletic conference of historically black colleges and universities (HBCUs) from 1935 to 1961
- South Central Conference (California), junior college athletic conference in California formed in 1948
- South Central Conference (Illinois), high school athletic conference in Illinois formed in 1926
- South Central Conference (Indiana), high school athletic conference in Indiana from 1936 to 1997
- South Central Conference (Iowa), high school athletic conference in Iowa formed in 1930
- South Central Conference (Minnesota), high school athletic conference formed in 2024, largely from former Minnesota River Conference member schools

== See also ==
- South Conference (disambiguation)
- South Central (disambiguation)
