= Northern Division =

Northern Division or North Division can refer to:

== Sports ==
- Northern Division (Rugby Union) Leagues of England
- Queensland Rugby League Northern Division
- Southern League Northern Division of the Southern Football League in England
- FA Women's Premier League Northern Division in England
- AFC North, a division of the American Football Conference in the National Football League (NFL)
- NFC North, a division of the National Football Conference in the NFL
- North Division (NHL), a division of the National Hockey League
- North Division (MPBL), a division of the Maharlika Pilipinas Basketball League
- North Division (CFL), a former division of the Canadian Football League
- Northern Division (AFL), a former division of the Arena Football League

== Government and politics ==
- Northern Division, Fiji
- Northern Division (New Zealand electorate), a former electorate of the Parliament of New Zealand
- Northern Division (Travancore), an administrative subdivision of the former princely state of Travancore in southern India

== Other uses ==
- División del Norte, a division that fought during the Mexican Revolution
- Northern Division (Syrian rebel group), a division of the Free Syrian Army

== See also ==
- Canadian Division (NHL), the northern division of the 1920s-1930s in the National Hockey League
- National League East, a division of the National League in Major League Baseball that was, in a geographical sense, formerly much closer to being a northern as opposed to an eastern division
- North Conference (disambiguation)
- Central Division (disambiguation)
- Eastern Division (disambiguation)
- Southern Division (disambiguation)
- Western Division (disambiguation)
- Division (disambiguation)
- Northern (disambiguation)
- North (disambiguation)
