= Southern Division =

Southern Division may refer to:

== Government and politics ==
- Southern Division (Travancore), an administrative subdivision of the former princely state of Travancore in southern India
- Southern Division (New Zealand electorate), a former constituency of the New Zealand Parliament
- South Cork (UK Parliament constituency) or Southern Division, a former constituency of the UK Parliament

== Railroad ==
- Southern Division of the Central Railroad of New Jersey
- Southern Division of the Long Island Rail Road
- Southern Division of the Wisconsin and Southern Railroad

== Other uses ==
- FA Women's Premier League Southern Division, in England
- Southern Army Division, a former division of the Swedish Army
- Wendell Phillips Academy High School or South Division High School, a school in Bronzeville, Chicago, Illinois, US

== Sports ==
- American Division (NHL), the southern division of the National Hockey League in the 1920s-1930s
- National League West, a division of the National League in Major League Baseball that was formerly much closer (in a geographical sense) to being a southern as opposed to western division
- Southern Division (cricket), a division of Minor League Cricket

== See also ==
- Central Division (disambiguation)
- Eastern Division (disambiguation)
- Military Division of the South (1869–1876), a U.S. Army division during the Reconstruction Period
- Northern Division (disambiguation)
- South Conference (disambiguation)
- South Division (disambiguation)
- Western Division (disambiguation)
