= South Division =

South Division may refer to:

- South Division (AFL), a division of the Arena Football League
- South Division (MPBL), a division of the Maharlika Pilipinas Basketball League
- South Division (CFL), a former division of the Canadian Football League
- South Division (NAHL), a division of the North American Hockey League
- South Division High School, a school in Milwaukee, Wisconsin, US
- Wendell Phillips Academy High School or South Division High School, a school in Bronzeville, Chicago, Illinois, US

== See also ==
- American Division (NHL), the south division of the National Hockey League in the 1920s–1930s
- Military Division of the South (1869–1876), a U.S. Army during the Reconstruction Period
- South Division One (disambiguation)
- South Division Two (disambiguation)
- Southern Division (disambiguation)
