= South Conference =

South Conference, Southern Conference, Conference South, or variant, may refer to:

- National League South (formerly Conference South), National League, England, UK; a tier 1 pro soccer league division below elite league
- Big South Conference, Division I, NCAA, USA; a collegiate sports conference
- Southern Conference, Division I, NCAA, USA; a collegiate sports conference
- Conference League South, UK; a tier 4 division of rugby league football

== See also ==
- South Central Conference (disambiguation)
- Southern Division (disambiguation)
- Conference
- Southern (disambiguation)
- South (disambiguation)
