= Yau Ma Tei station =

MTR interchange station in Kowloon, Hong Kong

Yau Ma Tei 油麻地
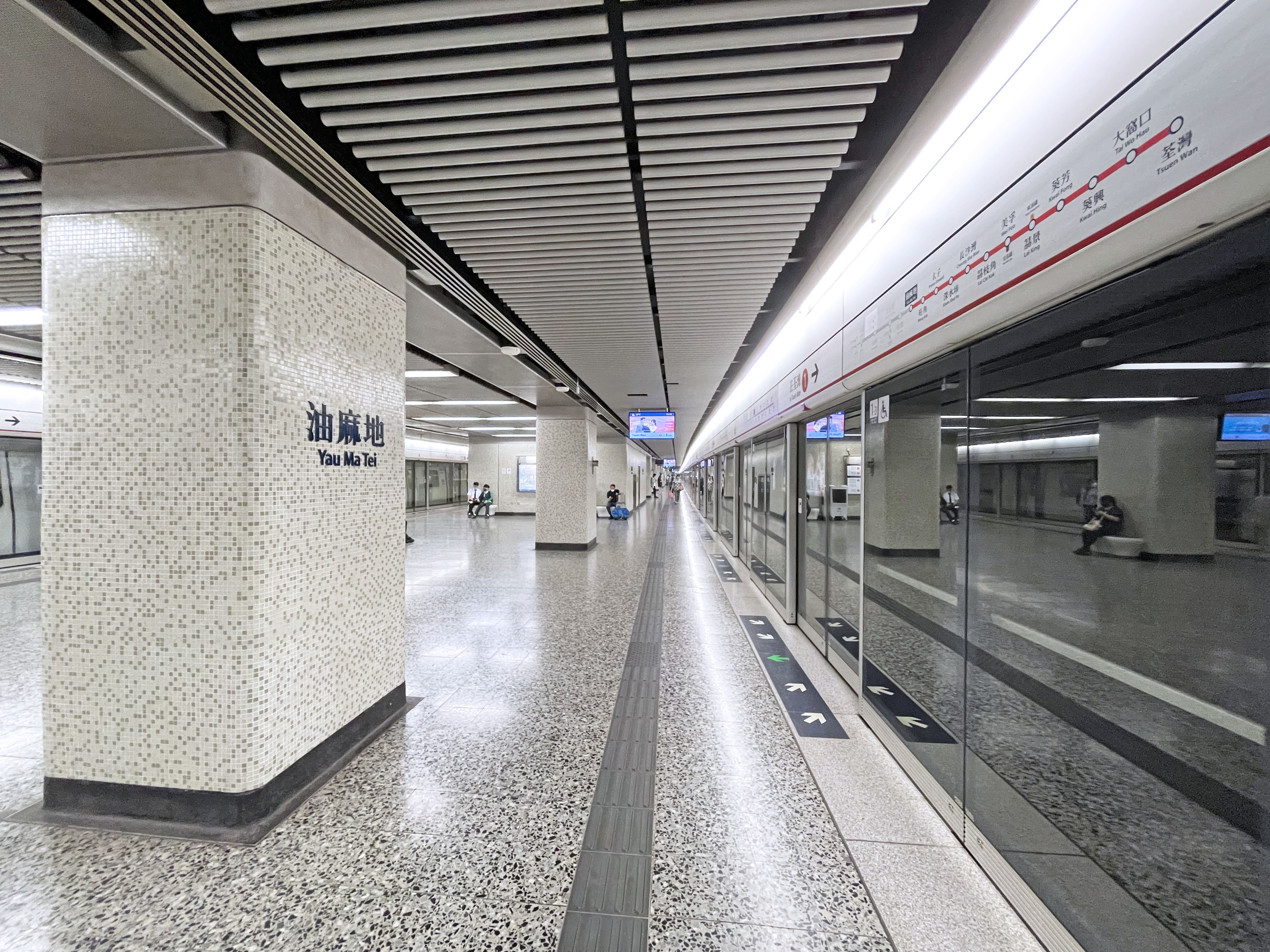
- Platform 1 of Yau Ma Tei station

Chinese name
- Chinese: 油麻地
- Jyutping: Jau4maa4dei2
- Hanyu Pinyin: Yóumádì
- Literal meaning: Oil Jute Land
Transcriptions
Standard Mandarin
- Hanyu Pinyin: Yóumádì
Yue: Cantonese
- Yale Romanization: Yàumàdéi
- IPA: [jɐw˩ma˩tej˧˥]
- Jyutping: Jau4maa4dei2

General information
- Location: Nathan Road × Waterloo Road, Yau Ma Tei; Yau Tsim Mong District, Hong Kong
- Coordinates: 22°18′46″N 114°10′15″E
- System: MTR rapid transit station
- Owner: MTR Corporation
- Operator: MTR Corporation
- Lines: Tsuen Wan line; Kwun Tong line
- Platforms: 4 (2 island platforms)
- Tracks: 4
- Connections: Bus, minibus

Construction
- Structure type: Underground
- Platform levels: 2
- Accessible: Yes

Other information
- Station code: YMT

History
- Opened: Kwun Tong line : 22 December 1979; 46 years ago; Tsuen Wan line : 17 May 1982; 44 years ago
- Former names: Waterloo

Services
Preceding station	MTR	Following station
Jordan towards Central	Tsuen Wan line	Mong Kok towards Tsuen Wan
Ho Man Tin towards Whampoa	Kwun Tong line	Mong Kok towards Tiu Keng Leng
Track layout
Location
- Location within MTR Location within Hong Kong urban core

Yau Ma Tei, formerly named Waterloo after Waterloo Road (1979-1985), is an MTR station located in Yau Ma Tei, Kowloon, Hong Kong. It lays straightly like a long box under thoroughfare Nathan Road, ending north under Pitt Street and south near Man Ming Lane. It is served by the Kwun Tong line and the Tsuen Wan line. The station opened on 22 December 1979 and was renamed as Yau Ma Tei on 31 May 1985 along with Argyle (Mong Kok) and Chater (Central).

Yau Ma Tei is an interchange station, even though the platforms are not designed for cross-platform interchange. After the Kwun Tong line has been extended to Whampoa, it is used by northbound passengers on one line to change to southbound trains on the other line. This station is used by many students during commuting hours, since it is in the vicinity of many large schools.

The station's livery colour is a light grey. Red, white, and blue stripes, which prominently adorned the station walls until they were removed as part of renovation works in 2005 which also saw the original Helvetica typeface, used in station name signs, replaced by Myriad.

== History ==
In 1967, the station was proposed as Waterloo, a double station with Tsuen Wan Line on the east side of Nathan Road, and Kwun Tong Line the west, linking with pedestrian tunnels, in Hong Kong Mass Transport Study. The design was later scaled down when the projected population was recalculated based on new census data.

Contract 101 includes the construction of this station, along with Argyle (now Mong Kok) and Prince Edward stations. It was awarded to a joint venture between Gammon, Kier International, and Lilley Construction. The station, along with other sections under Nathan Road, was built with cut-and-cover. This inevitably brought much trouble on Nathan Road, the thoroughfare in Kowloon Peninsular. The construction induced serious traffic congestion in Kowloon, produced quite amount of dust to the environment, and affected the business on both side of the road.

On 16 December 1979, The Kwun Tong line was extended from Shek Kip Mei to Tsim Sha Tsui station. However, Yau Ma Tei station was opened on 22nd of that month as an infill station. When the station was first opened, only upper level platform was in use. Three weeks before Tsuen Wan line opened, on 26 April 1982, MTR Corporation split the Modified Initial System into Kwun Tong line and Tsuen Wan line, in order to let passengers to get used to transfer at Mong Kok station. On the same day, the lower level platform was put into use.

The Kwun Tong line was extended to Whampoa station on 23 October 2016.

== Station layout ==
From the scissor crossing after Whampoa terminus to north of Yau Ma Tei, the Kwun Tong line drives on the right side of the tunnel, as opposed to almost everywhere else in the MTR, where the driving direction is usually on the left (except for the Tuen Ma line). The difference in driving directionality is due to the track layout between Yau Ma Tei and Mong Kok stations.

The Kwun Tong line extension towards Whampoa station via Ho Man Tin opened on 23 October 2016. In preparation, the numbers of the Kwun Tong line platforms were swapped starting on 11 June 2016, and platform 4 became alighting-only (and platform 3 boarding-only) from 21 August 2016. After the opening of the Kwun Tong line extension, Yau Ma Tei became an interchange station between the Kwun Tong line and the Tsuen Wan line, with each line using platforms on a different level.

G	Street level	Exits
L1	Concourse	Customer service, MTRShops
L1	Concourse	Vending machines, Automatic teller machines
L2; Ground Platforms	Platform 1	Tsuen Wan line towards Tsuen Wan (Mong Kok)
L2; Ground Platforms	Island platform, doors will open on the right
L2; Ground Platforms	Platform 2	Tsuen Wan line towards Central (Jordan)
L3; Basement Platforms	Platform 4	Kwun Tong line towards Whampoa (Ho Man Tin)
L3; Basement Platforms	Island platform, doors will open on the left
L3; Basement Platforms	Platform 3	Kwun Tong line towards Tiu Keng Leng (Mong Kok)

== Livery ==
The station's livery is light grey and red in concourse and exits

== Entrances/exits ==
- A1: Pitt Street
- A2: Pitt Street, YMCA Kowloon Centre, Kwong Wah Hospital
- B1: Nathan Road
- B2: Portland Street, 8 Waterloo Road
- C: Man Ming Lane (for Temple Street)
- D: Waterloo Road, Metropark Hotel Kowloon

== Gallery ==
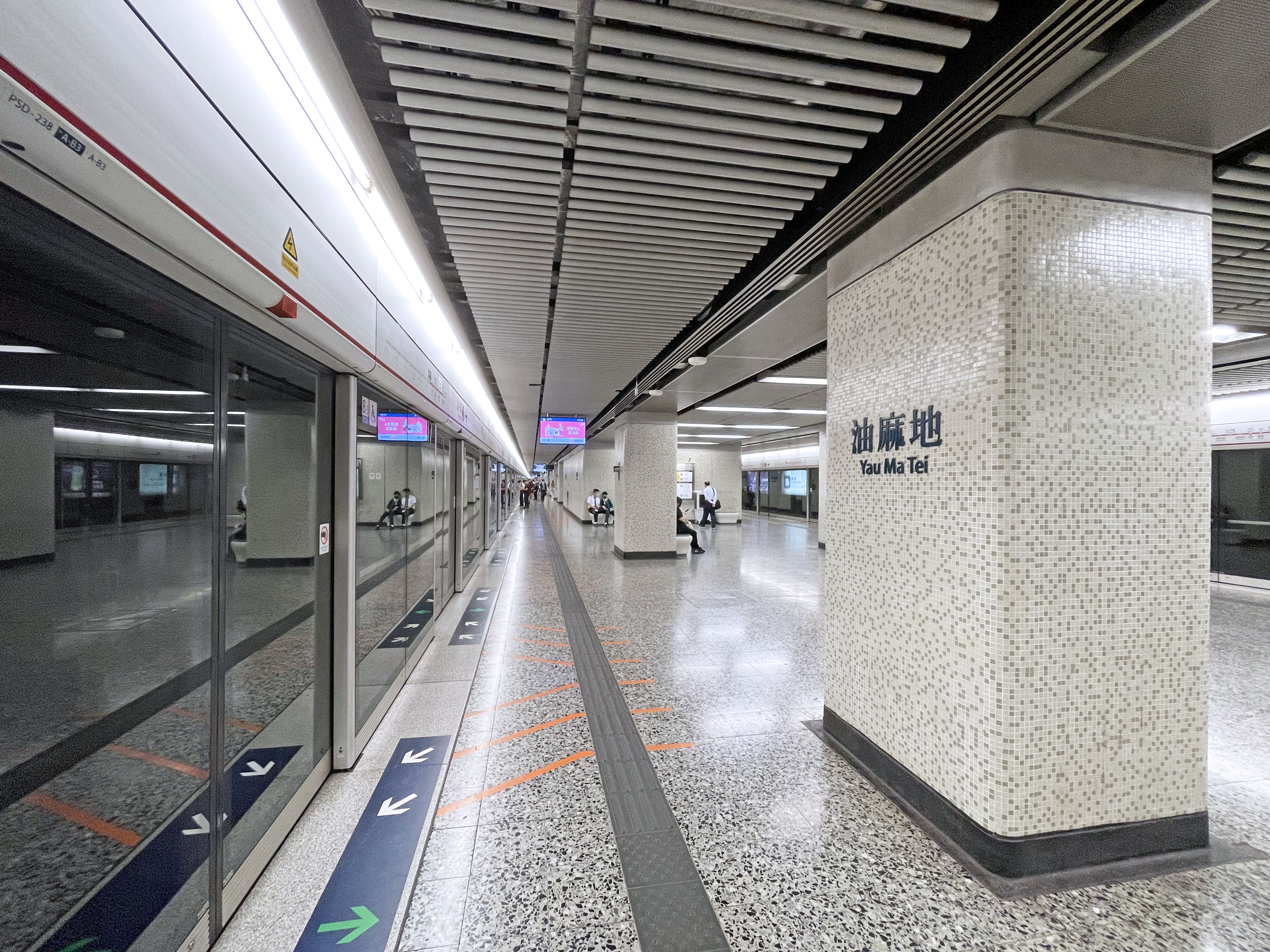
Tsuen Wan line platforms (May 2022)

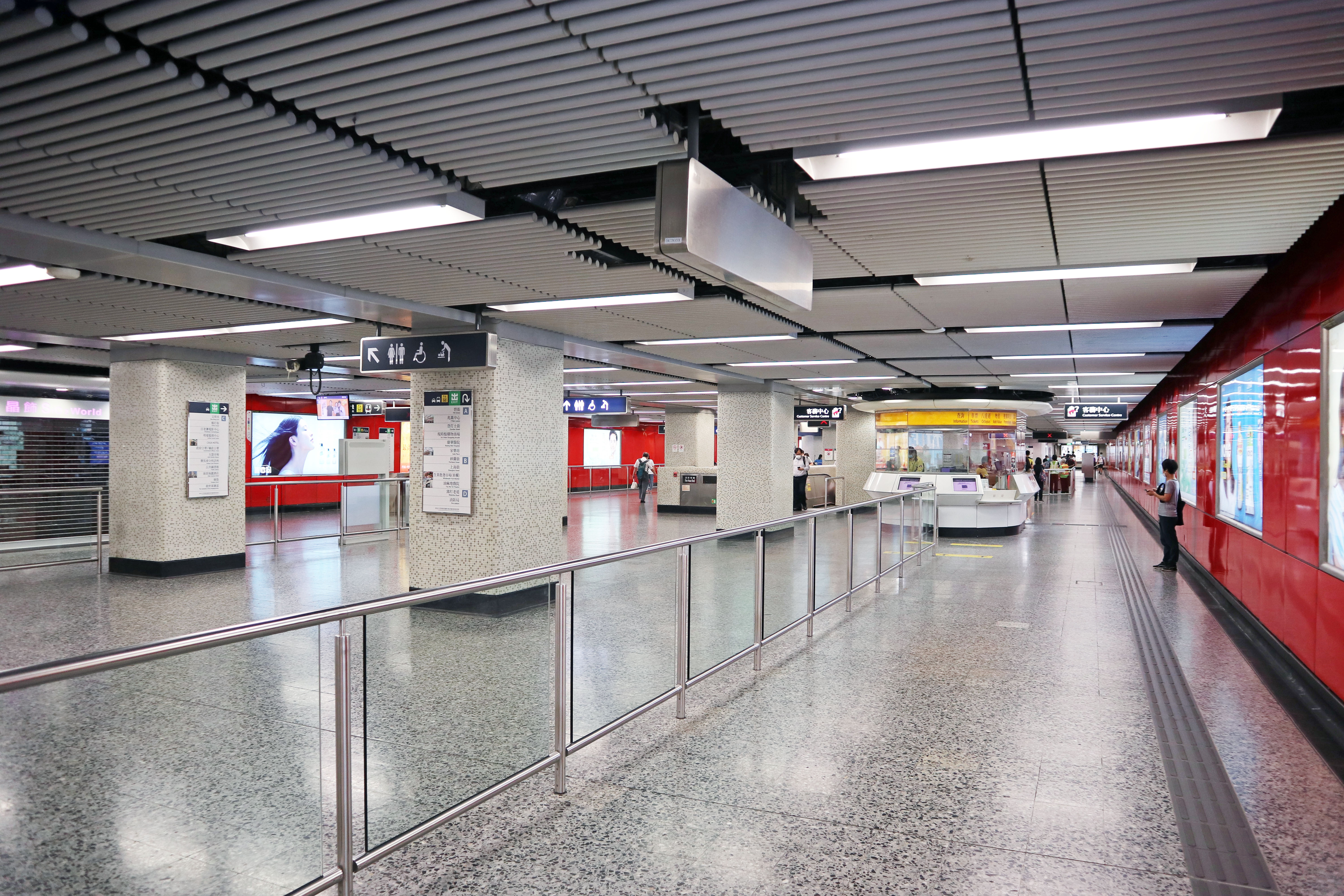
Station concourse with the customer service centre booth sitting between the paid and unpaid areas (July 2020)
