= Whampoa Garden =

Private housing estate in Hung Hom, Kowloon, Hong Kong

Coordinates: 22.3039°N 114.1922°E

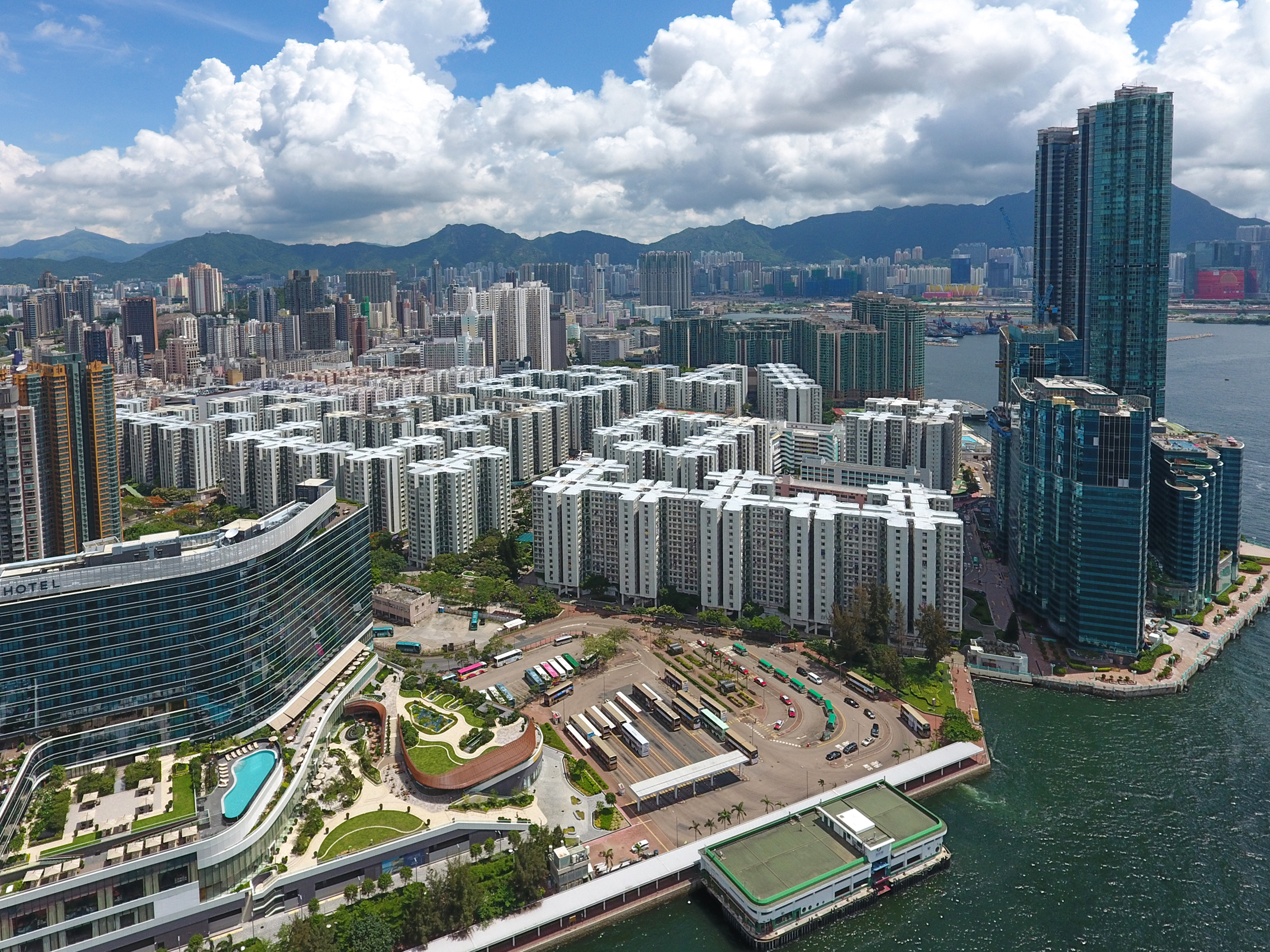
- Whampoa Garden in June 2017
- Interactive map of Whampoa Garden
- Location: Hung Hom
- Status: Complete
- Groundbreaking: 1985; 41 years ago
- Constructed: 1991; 35 years ago

Companies
- Developer: Hutchison Whampoa Property Limited (HWP)
- Manager: Hutchison Whampoa Limited

Technical details
- Buildings: 88 buildings in 12 complexes

Whampoa Garden
- Traditional Chinese: 黃埔花園
- Simplified Chinese: 黄埔花园
Transcriptions
Standard Mandarin
- Hanyu Pinyin: Huángpǔ Huāyuán
Yue: Cantonese
- Jyutping: wong4 bou3 faa1 jyun4

Whampoa Garden (Chinese: 黃埔花園; Jyutping: wong4 bou3 faa1 jyun4) is the largest private housing estate in Hung Hom, Kowloon, Hong Kong. It was built on the site of the former Whampoa Dockyards by Hutchison Whampoa Property. The urban design of the estate incorporates concepts inspired by the Garden city movement and was completed in 1991.

== Features ==
The estate covers 19 hectares and consists of 12 complexes. Ten are residential/commercial mixed use, with a total of 88 residential high-rise towers (16-storey). The other two are solely commercial use. There was a height restriction on the buildings due to its proximity to the Kai Tak Airport at the time. It includes eight shopping arcades, three supermarkets, a cinema, hundreds of restaurants and shops, a karaoke, five primary schools, mini-parks and two public transport interchange.

There are 10,431 flats, ranging from 351 to 1,110 square feet (32.6 to 103.1 m^{2}), in the 88 residential towers.

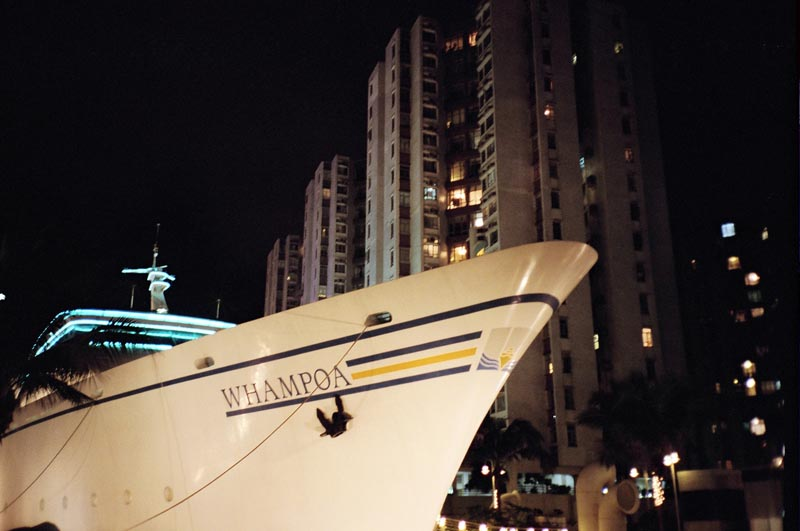
The Whampoa, a long boat-shaped shopping centre in September 2005

Notable commercial outlets include the first ParknShop Hong Kong Superstore, which was opened in 1996 in Whampoa Garden Phase 12 with a floor space of 4,200 square metres (45,000 ft^{2}). Other notable shops include Sushiro, AEON (Japanese department store), Sukiya, Wonderland Superstore.

The Whampoa, a 110 metres (360 ft)-long boat-shaped shopping centre built in the original No. 1 Dry Dock, is located in Phase 6. During the 1980s and 1990s, the structure housed a playground on the top and "deck" level, seafood restaurants, a cinema on other floors above ground levels; the department store Yaohan on ground and basement level, and an indoor family theme park (The Wonderful World of Whimsy, 開心一號) with an arcade game centre and a roller skating rink on lower basement level. In late 1990s, the department store was taken over by JUSCO department store. The JUSCO department store was renamed to AEON in 2013, to be consistent with the name change adopted by its parent company in Japan. In May 2016, the department store was renovated and renamed as AEON Style after its reopening in September the same year.

There is also a promenade along sea side, from Laguna Verde to Hung Hom Ferry Pier. It is also linked to the Avenue of Stars. One can walk from Hung Hom Pier to Tsim Sha Tsui Pier in about 40 minutes.

== Complexes ==
Map of Whampoa Garden

Phase	Name	No. blocks	No. floors	No. units	Year built
1	Juniper Mansions	5	15	600	1985
2	Cherry Mansions	18	15	2,160	1987
3	Willow Mansions	8	15	959	1987
4	Palm Mansions	6	15	720	1987
5	Oak Mansions	9	15	1,080	1988
7	Cotton Tree Mansions	5	15	465	1988
9	Lily Mansions	10	16	1,218	1989
10	Banyan Mansions	5	15	600	1988
11	Bauhinia Mansions	13	15	1,560	1989
12	Bamboo Mansions	9	15	1,079	1991

== Demographic ==
According to the 2016 by-census, Whampoa Gardens had a population of 30,198. The median age was 41.8. Nearly 88 per cent of the estate was of Chinese ethnicity. Cantonese speakers comprised 87 per cent of the speaking population, with English as the second-most usual spoken language, at 7 per cent.

== Transportation ==
MTR

Whampoa Garden is served by Whampoa station, the terminus of the Kwun Tong line. The underground station, located beneath Tak On Street, opened on 23 October 2016. The station is adjacent to the Whampoa Garden Bus Terminus. It is also a short walk away from the Hung Hom Ferry Pier.

Ferry
- Hung Hom to North Point
- Hung Hom to Central

== Education ==
Whampoa Garden and Whampoa Estate are in Primary One Admission (POA) School Net 35. Within the school net are multiple aided schools (operated independently but funded with government money) and Ma Tau Chung Government Primary School (Hung Hom Bay) (馬頭涌官立小學（紅磡灣）).
