= Central Division (web series) =

- Genre: Cop show Web series
- Created by: Aleem Hossain
- Directed by: Aleem Hossain
- Starring: Brian Silverman; Clay Wilcox
- Country of origin: United States
- Original language: English
- No. of seasons: 1
- No. of episodes: 4

Production
- Production location: Los Angeles, California
- Running time: Varies (2-3 minutes)

Original release
- Network: YouTube
- Release: July 20, 2009 – 2009

Central Division is a police drama web series about detectives in the LAPD's downtown precinct (known as Central Division). The show premiered on July 20, 2009. Central Division was created by Aleem Hossain and stars Brian Silverman and Clay Wilcox.

== History ==
A lack of gritty cop shows on television in 2009 inspired Hossain to create one on the internet. He had been a longtime fan of programs like Homicide: Life on the Streets, NYPD Blue, and The Shield. Hossain wrote and directed all four episodes of Season 1, which were shot on June 27, 2009 in Los Angeles.

== Characters and Plot ==
=== Season 1 ===
Det. Edwards (left) and Det. Hodge (right) in episode 1 of Central Division

The first season of the show centers on Detective Alan Edwards (played by Brian Silverman) and Detective Frank Hodge (played by Clay Wilcox) of the LAPD's central division. After leaving an internal affairs interview the two detectives find a body in the trunk of their car and this sets off the major events of the first season.

== Critical reception ==
Season 1 was well received by web media critics:

Tubefilter's review was titled 'Central Division Brings Back the Punchy Dark Cops Show' and had high praise for the show: "Wow. Central Division is one intense cop drama... check this show out, please, you won’t regret it."

Visioweb said "Brian Silverman and Clay Wilcox deliver a tight performance, enhanced by the dark and brooding cinematography of Julie Kirkwood... As short as it may be, it is a powerful show."

Dauntless Media called Central Division "a series worth following" with a "truly shocking twist."
