= Eastern Conference =

Eastern Conference or East Conference or variation, may refer to:

== Basketball ==
- Eastern Conference (NBA), one of two conferences in the National Basketball Association
- Eastern Conference (WNBA), one of two conferences in the Women's National Basketball Association

== Hockey ==
- Eastern Conference (NHL), one of two conferences in the National Hockey League
- Eastern Conference (KHL), one of two conferences in the Kontinental Hockey League

== Soccer ==
- Eastern Conference (MLS), one of two conferences in Major League Soccer
- Eastern Conference (USL), one of two conferences in the USL Championship league

== Other ==
- Eastern Conference (NFL), now succeeded by AFC North and NFC East
- Eastern Conference (IFL), one of two conferences in the Indoor Football League
- Eastern Conference (RHI), one of two conferences in Roller Hockey International
- Eastern Conference was an NCAA Division II collegiate athletic conference now called Northeast-10 Conference
- Eastern Conference (California), junior college athletic conference in Southern California that operated from 1932 to 1969
- Eastern Conference Records is a record company founded by rap duo the High and Mighty

== See also ==
- Conference
- Eastern (disambiguation)
- East (disambiguation)
- Western Conference
