= Central South station =

Proposed railway station in Hong Kong

Central South 中環南

General information
- Location: Central; Central and Western District; Hong Kong
- System: Proposed MTR rapid transit station
- Owner: KCR Corporation
- Operator: MTR Corporation
- Line: East Rail line

Construction
- Structure type: Underground

Other information
- Station code: CES

Services
Preceding station	MTR	Following station
Proposed
Terminus	East Rail line Shatin to Central Link	Admiralty towards Lo Wu or Lok Ma Chau

Central South (Chinese: 中環南站) was a planned MTR station on the Sha Tin to Central Link. If it was constructed, the station would have served as the southern terminus of the North South Corridor. In the 2012 and 2013 MTR annual reports, Central South station was marked on the Future Stations and Network Map.

== History ==
When KCRC submitted its first proposal on the new line, the station was named Central West, and had a site to the west of the one in the current proposal.

In 2004, KCRC submitted a new proposal, which pointed out that there are technical problems on the original planned location of the station, due to the soft soil found there. The proposal suggested an option of placing the station somewhere south of Upper Albert Road.

In 2008, the Government announced that it was considering the proposal that MTR had recently submitted, in which Central South station will be cancelled, with details of the final plan to be announced. In March, a new proposal of the project was announced, in which Central South station will not be built, as a better site had yet to be found.
