= West Central =

West Central may refer to:

- West Central (London Assembly constituency)
- WC postcode area
- West Central (General Electors Communal Constituency, Fiji), a former electoral division of Fiji
- West Central Wireless
