= Western Conference =

Western Conference or West Conference or variation, may refer to:

== Basketball ==
- Western Conference (NBA), one of two conferences in the National Basketball Association
- Western Conference (WNBA), one of two conferences in the Women's National Basketball Association

== Hockey ==
- Western Conference (NHL), one of two conferences in the National Hockey League
- Western Conference (KHL), one of two conferences in the Kontinental Hockey League
- Western Conference (PWHL), one of two conferences in the Professional Women's Hockey League

== Soccer ==
- Western Conference (MLS), one of two conferences in Major League Soccer
- Western Conference (USL), one of two conferences in the USL Championship league

== Other ==
- Western Conference (NFL), succeeded by NFC North and NFC West
- Western Conference (IFL), one of two conferences in the Indoor Football League
- Western Conference (RHI), one of two conferences in Roller Hockey International
- Western Athletic Conference, an NCAA Division I college athletic conference in the U.S.
- Western State Conference, affiliated with California Community College Athletic Association
- One of the historical names of Big Ten Conference, a college athletic conference in the U.S.
- Western Conference on Linguistics, an annual conference on Linguistics

== See also ==
- Western Football Conference (disambiguation)
- West Central Conference (disambiguation)
- Conference
- Western (disambiguation)
- West (disambiguation)
- Eastern Conference
