= South Central =

South Central may refer to:

== Entertainment ==
- South Central (film), a 1992 film starring Glenn Plummer
- South Central (soundtrack), a soundtrack album from the film
- South Central (TV series), a 1994 comedy-drama starring Larenz Tate

== Places ==
- South Central China, a region of the People's Republic of China
- South Central Province, Maldives
- South Central United States
- South Central Alaska, a region containing the Anchorage metropolitan area, U.S.
- South Los Angeles, an area in Los Angeles, California, U.S., formerly South Central Los Angeles
- South Central, Wichita, Kansas, U.S.
- South Central Coast, a region of Vietnam

== Rail transport ==
- South Central Railway zone, a part of Indian Railways
- Connex South Central, a train operating company in England from 1996 until 2001
- Southern (train operating company), a train operating company in England named South Central from 2001 until 2004

== Other uses ==
- South Central Conference (disambiguation)
- South Central Region (WFTDA)
