= Whampoa station =

MTR station in Kowloon, Hong Kong

Whampoa 黃埔
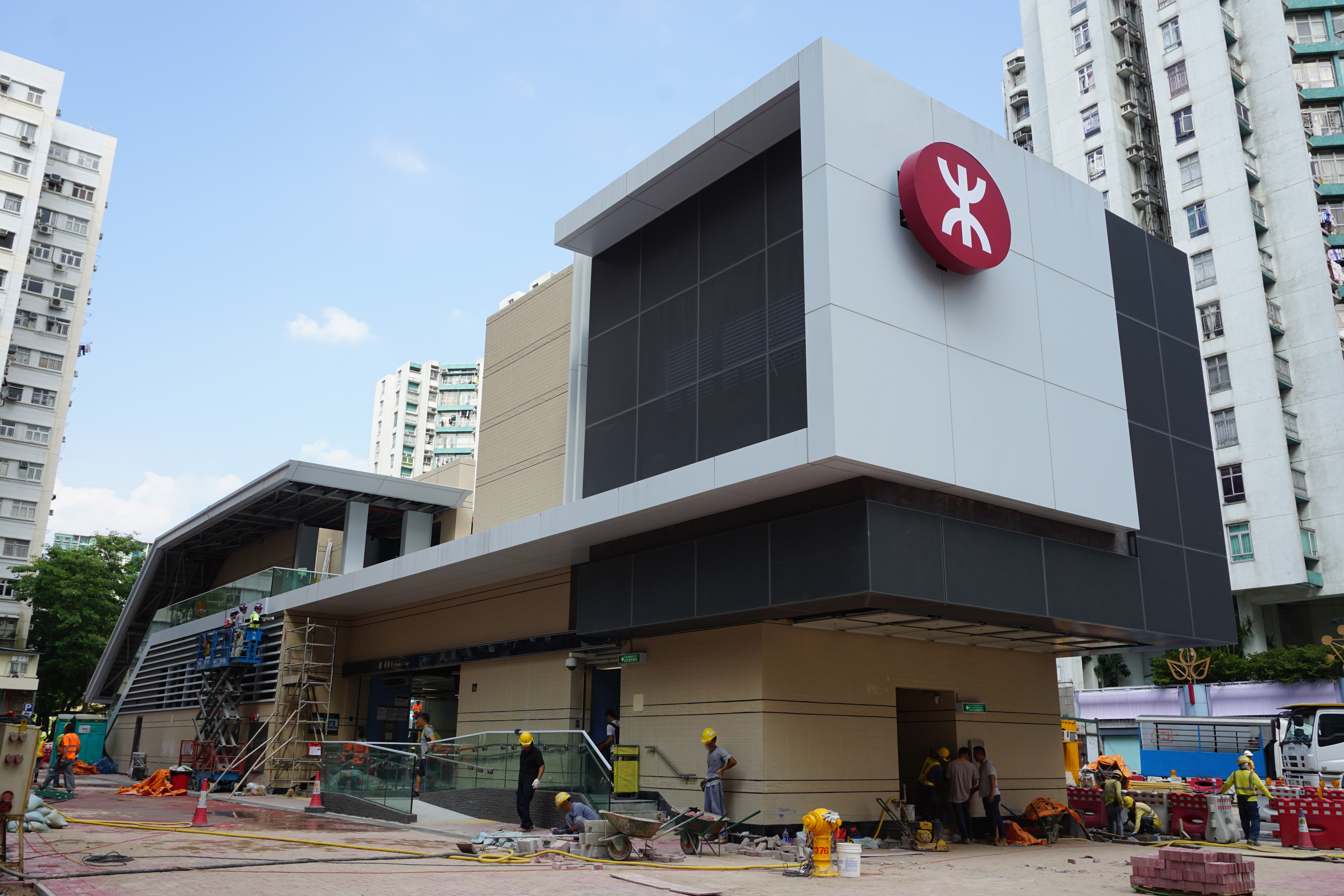
- Exterior of Whampoa station exit A in September 2016

Chinese name
- Traditional Chinese: 黃埔
- Simplified Chinese: 黄埔
- Jyutping: Wong4 bou3
- Hanyu Pinyin: Huángpǔ
- Literal meaning: Yellow Embankment
Transcriptions
Standard Mandarin
- Hanyu Pinyin: Huángpǔ
Yue: Cantonese
- Yale Romanization: Wòhng bou
- IPA: [wɔŋ˩pɔw˧]
- Jyutping: Wong4 bou3

General information
- Location: Tak On Street & Hung Hom Road, Hung Hom; Kowloon City District; Hong Kong
- Coordinates: 22°18′18″N 114°11′23″E
- System: MTR rapid transit station
- Owner: MTR Corporation
- Operator: MTR Corporation
- Line: Kwun Tong line
- Platforms: 1 side platform
- Tracks: 1

Construction
- Structure type: Underground
- Accessible: Yes

Other information
- Station code: WHA

History
- Opened: 23 October 2016; 9 years ago

Services
Preceding station	MTR	Following station
Terminus	Kwun Tong line	Ho Man Tin towards Tiu Keng Leng
Track layout
Location
- Location within MTR Location within Hong Kong urban core

Whampoa (Chinese: 黃埔; Jyutping: Wong4 bou3; Cantonese Yale: Wòhng bou) is the western terminus of the Kwun Tong line of the MTR in Hong Kong. It is located in Hung Hom, Kowloon City District within the developed area of Whampoa Garden immediately adjacent to the stern of The Whampoa, a symbol of identity for the area and its history.

The station was named after Whampoa Garden, which was built on the former site of Whampoa Dockyard.

== History ==
Whampoa station was constructed under the HK$856 million Kwun Tong Line Extension Contract 1002, which was awarded in 2011 to a joint venture comprising Hong Kong contractors Chun Wo and Hip Hing Construction. This contract covered both the station and the overrun tunnel beyond it.

The two station concourses were constructed using the cut-and-cover method, while the platform tunnel in between was built using the drill-and-split method. The use of tunnel boring machines was not preferred due to the lack of staging space in the densely built-up area, while drill-and-blast was not used at Whampoa Station in response to local concerns regarding safety and noise.

The station was originally due to open in 2015, but due to delays during the construction of the underground portion of the station, it opened on 23 October 2016.

== Station layout ==
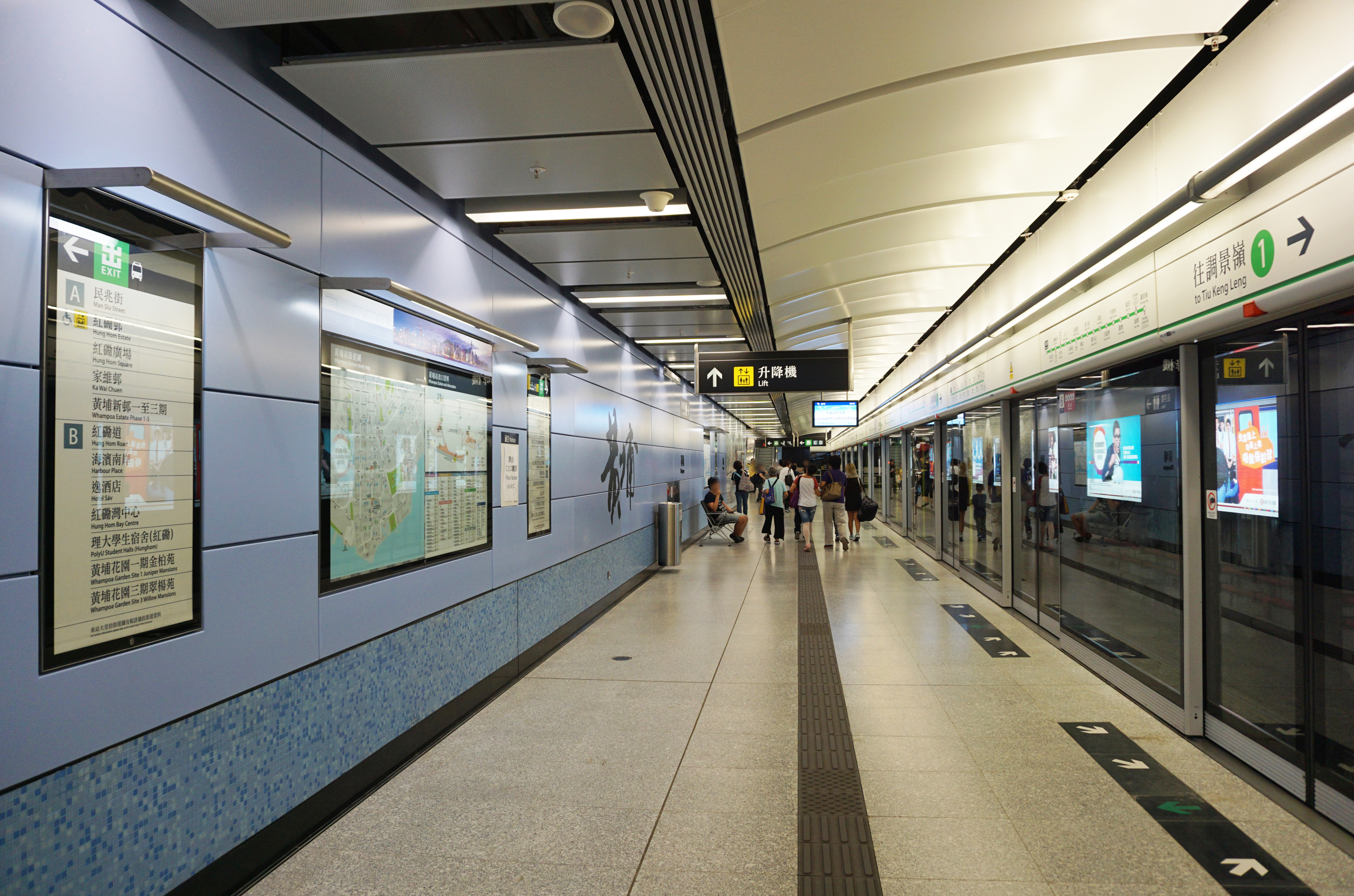
View down the platform in October 2016

The station consists of a platform connecting two separate concourses and is entirely underground except for the entrances and ventilation shafts. The western concourse is located at the junction of Hung Hom Road and Tak Man Street while the eastern concourse is located along Tak On Street and is crossed by Shung King and Tak Ting Streets.

Whampoa is the third station on the MTR network to have only one platform, as with the stations at Po Lam and Disneyland Resort; it is a terminal station with a single side platform. As the single track at Whampoa cannot accommodate all Kwun Tong line trains, during Monday to Friday peak hours (07:00 to 09:30, 16:30 to 19:00), Saturdays (07:15 to 20:00) as well as Sundays and public holidays (08:40 to 20:00), half of all Kwun Tong line trains terminate at the preceding Ho Man Tin station. As a result, trains serve Whampoa at four-minute intervals, twice as long as the other stations.

G	Street level	Exits
L1	Concourse	Customer service, MTRShops
L2; Platform	Side platform, doors will open on the left
L2; Platform	Platform 1	Kwun Tong line towards Tiu Keng Leng (Ho Man Tin)

=== Exits ===
- A: Man Siu Street, Hung Hom
- B: Hung Hom Road, Tak Man street, Royal Peninsula, Harbour Place
- C1/C2: Shung King Street, Whampoa Garden, Stars by the Harbour
- D1/D2: Tak On Street, Laguna Verde, The Harbourfront Landmark

== Connections ==
The station is adjacent to the Whampoa Garden Bus Terminus. It is also a short walk away from the Hung Hom Ferry Pier.

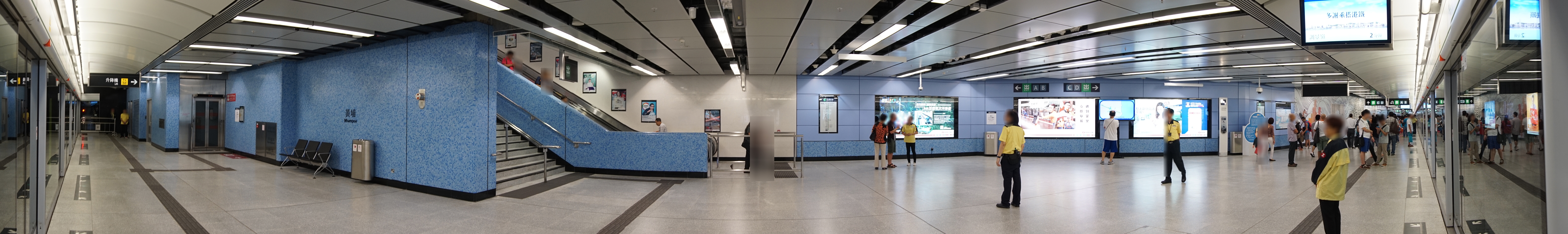
Panorama of the single platform in October 2016

== Gallery ==
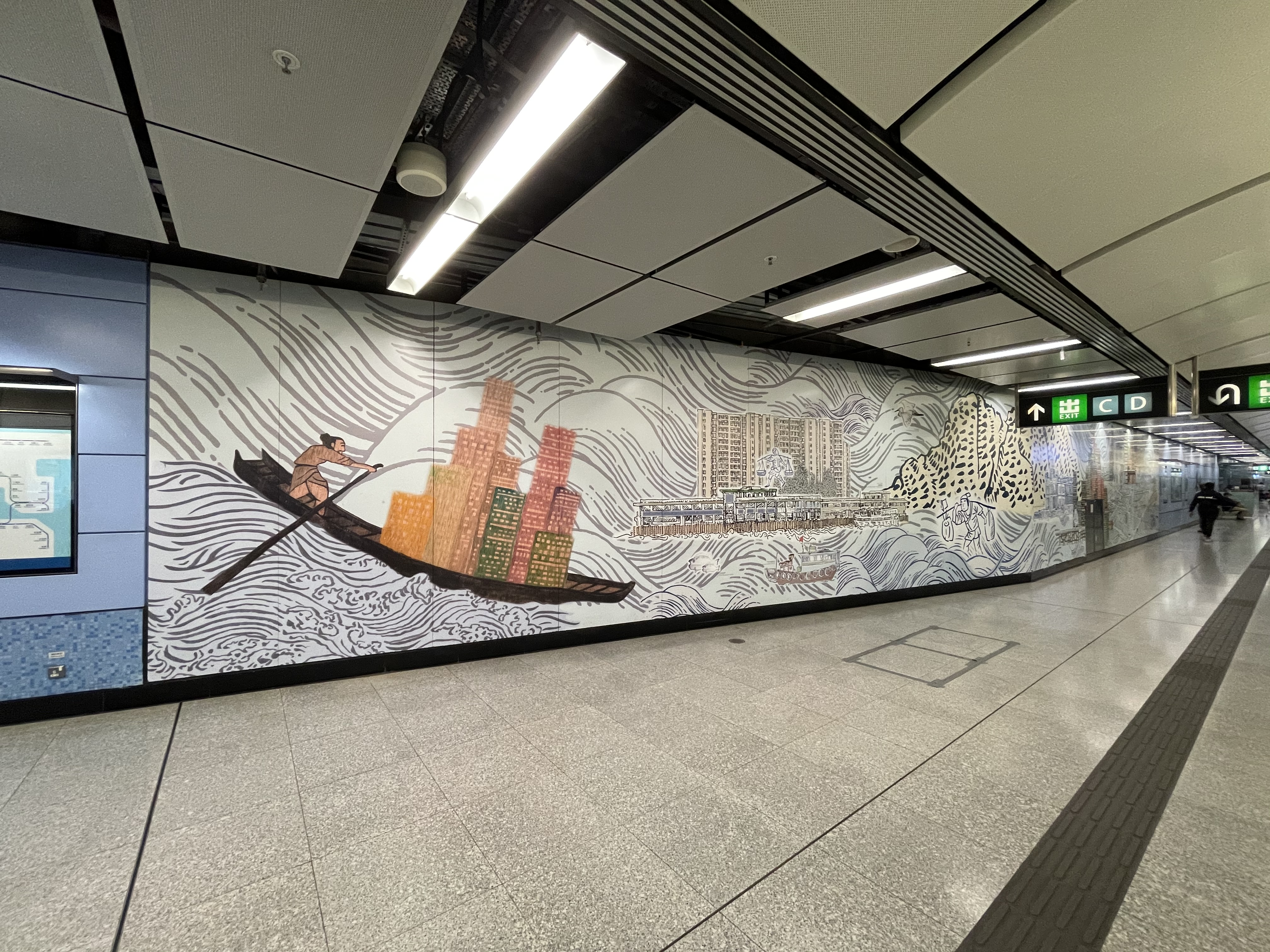
Whampoa Station Art (December 2020)

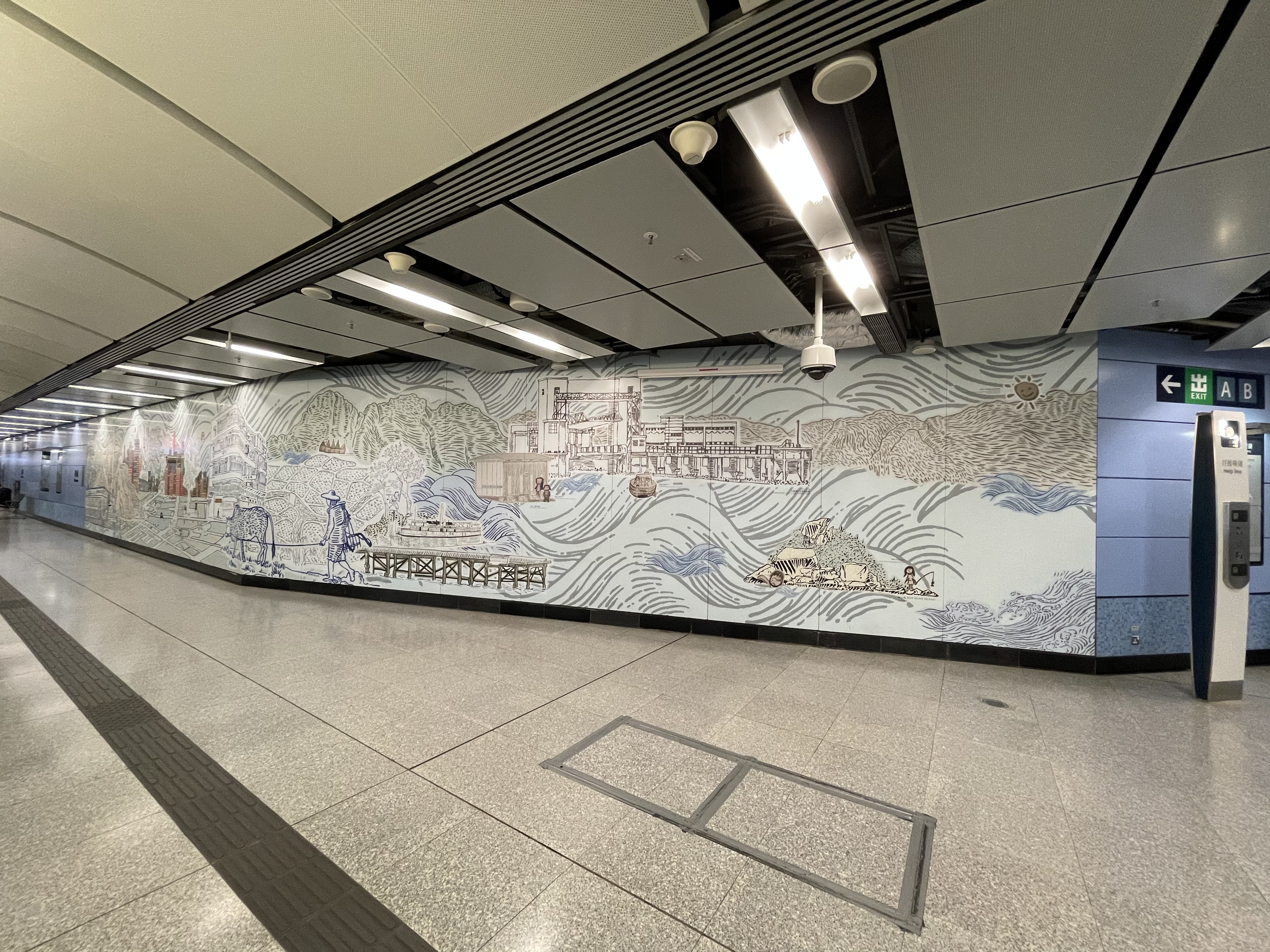
Whampoa Station Art (December 2020)

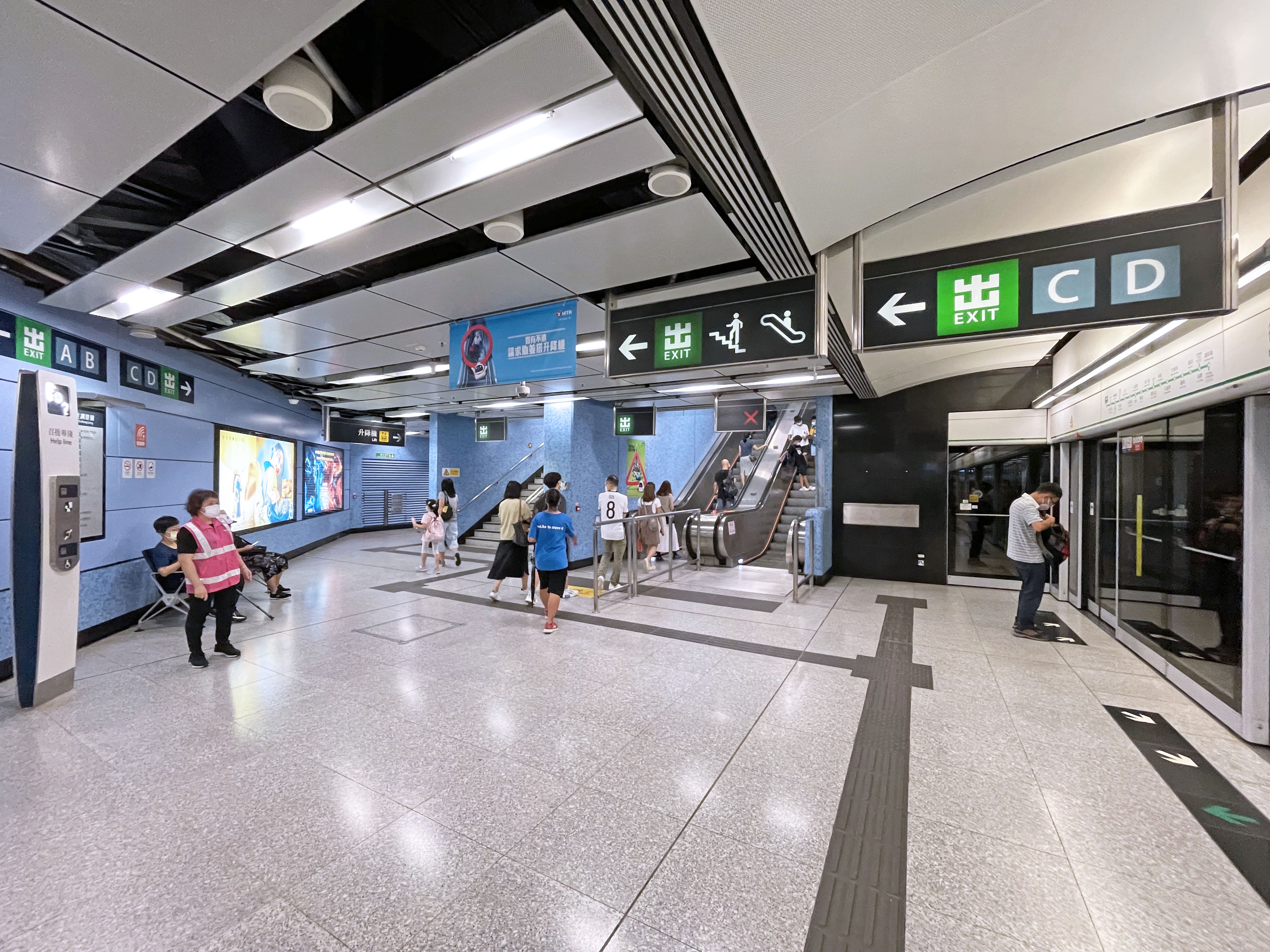
Access to the western concourse from the platform (August 2021)

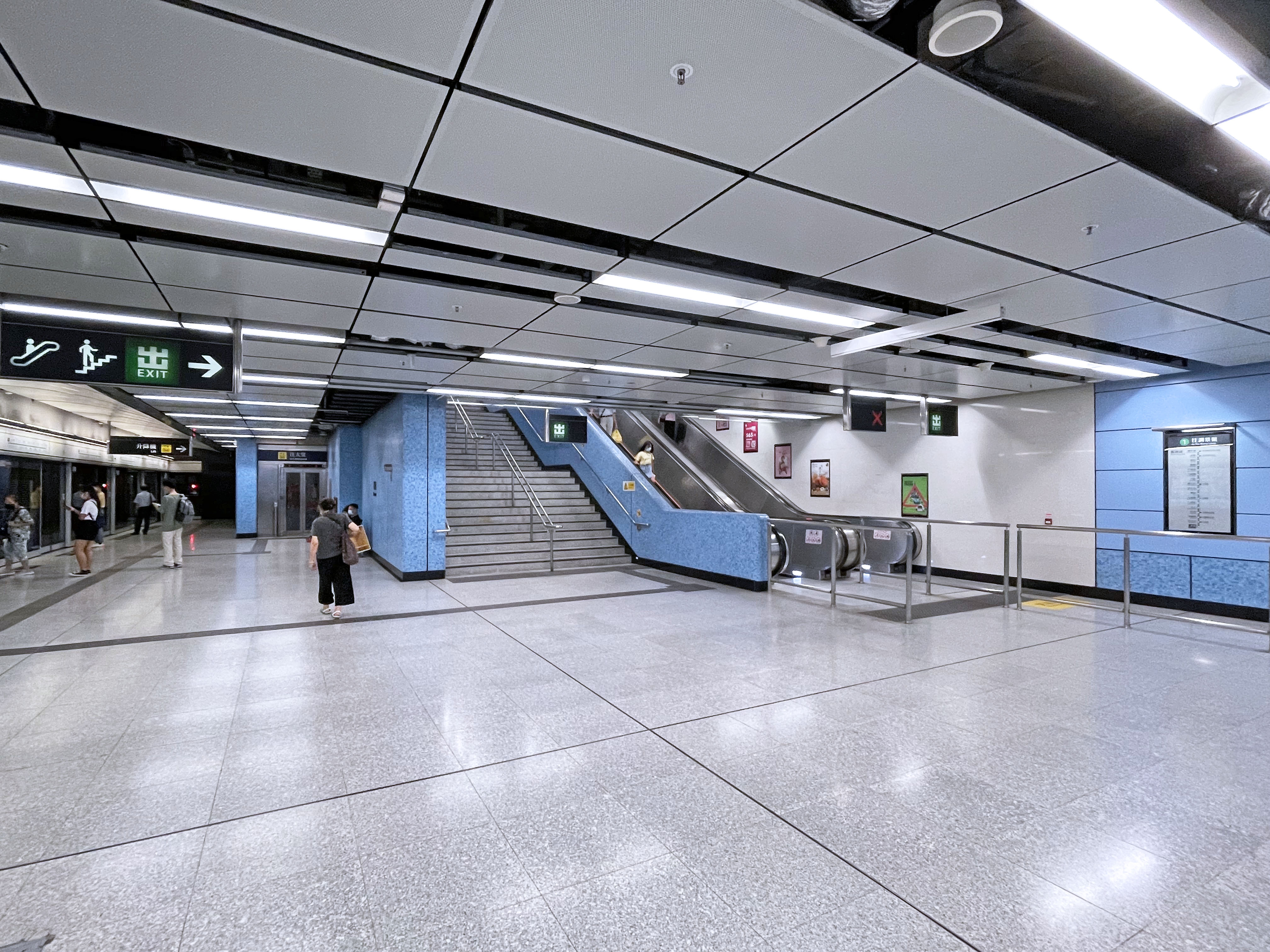
Access to the eastern concourse from the platform (August 2021)

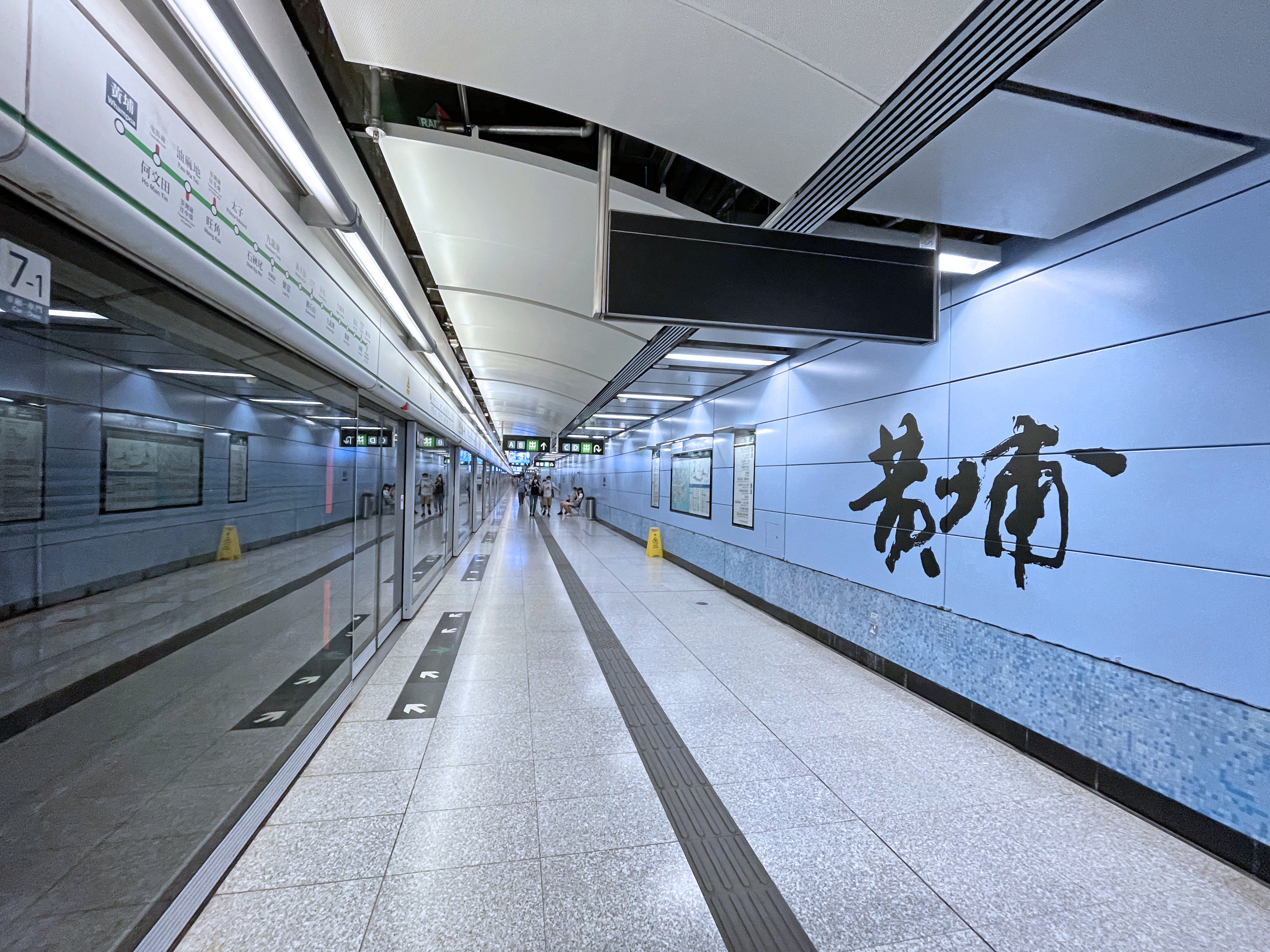
Platform (July 2021)

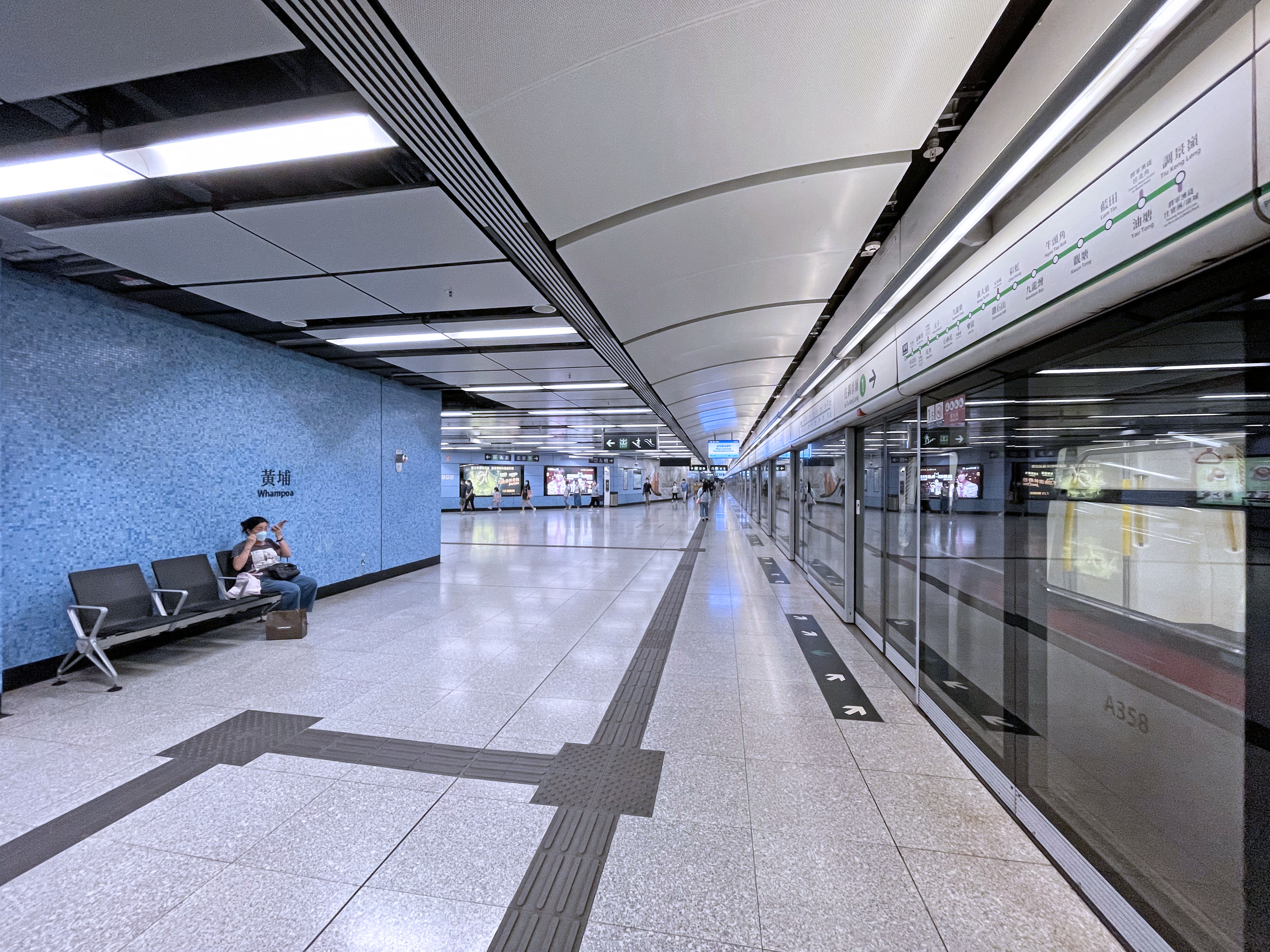
Platform (July 2021)

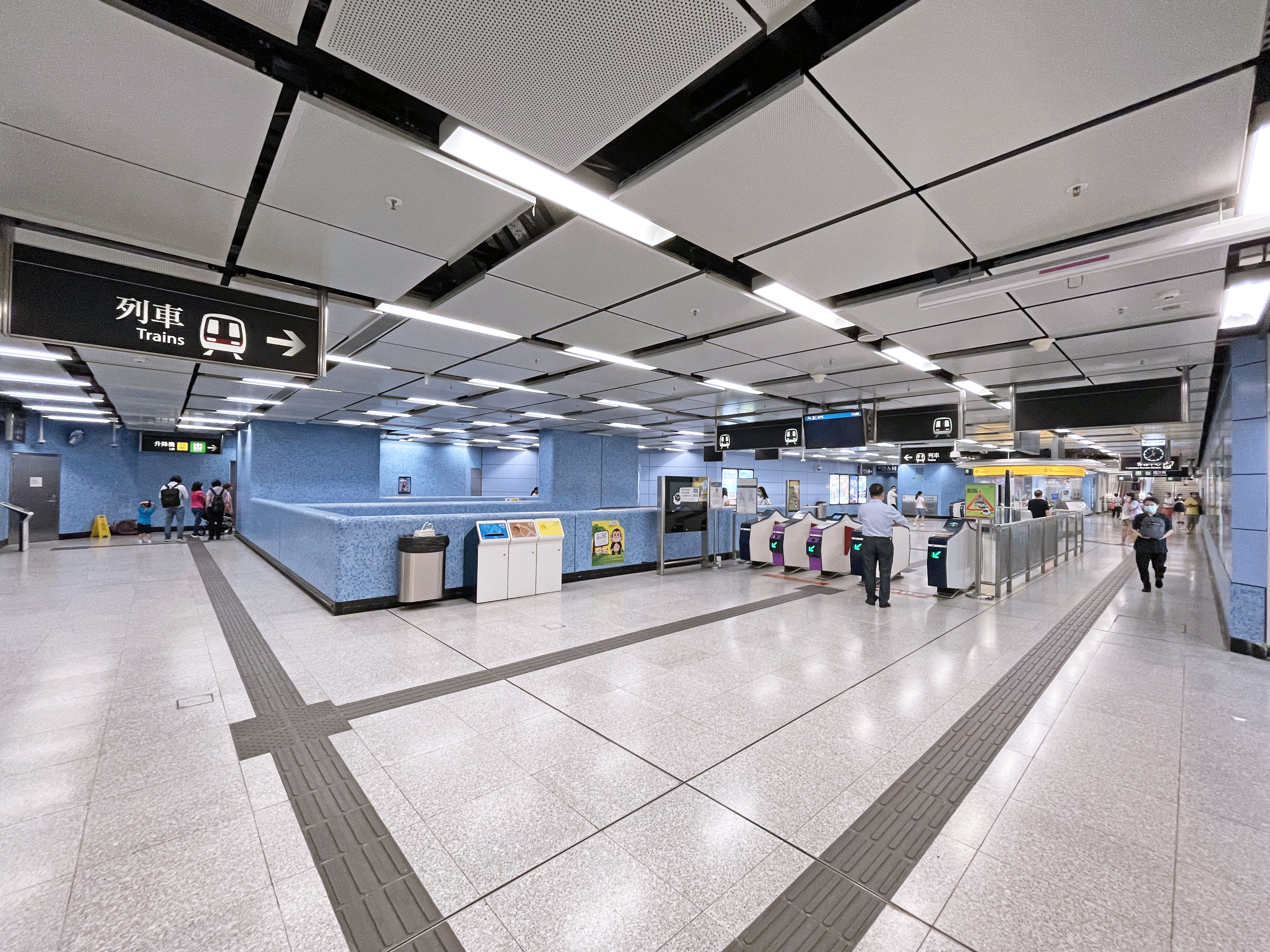
Eastern concourse (July 2021)

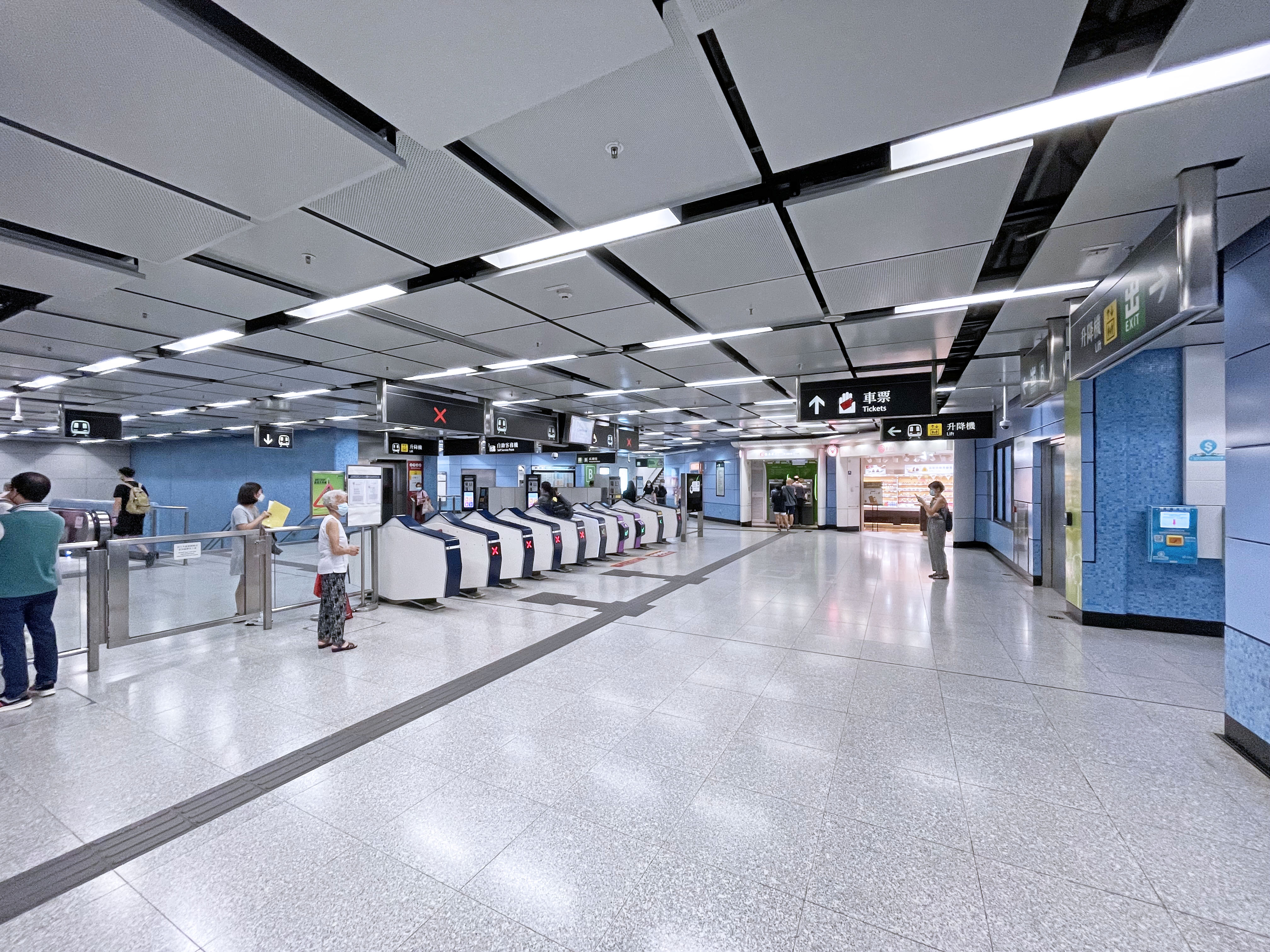
Western concourse (July 2021)

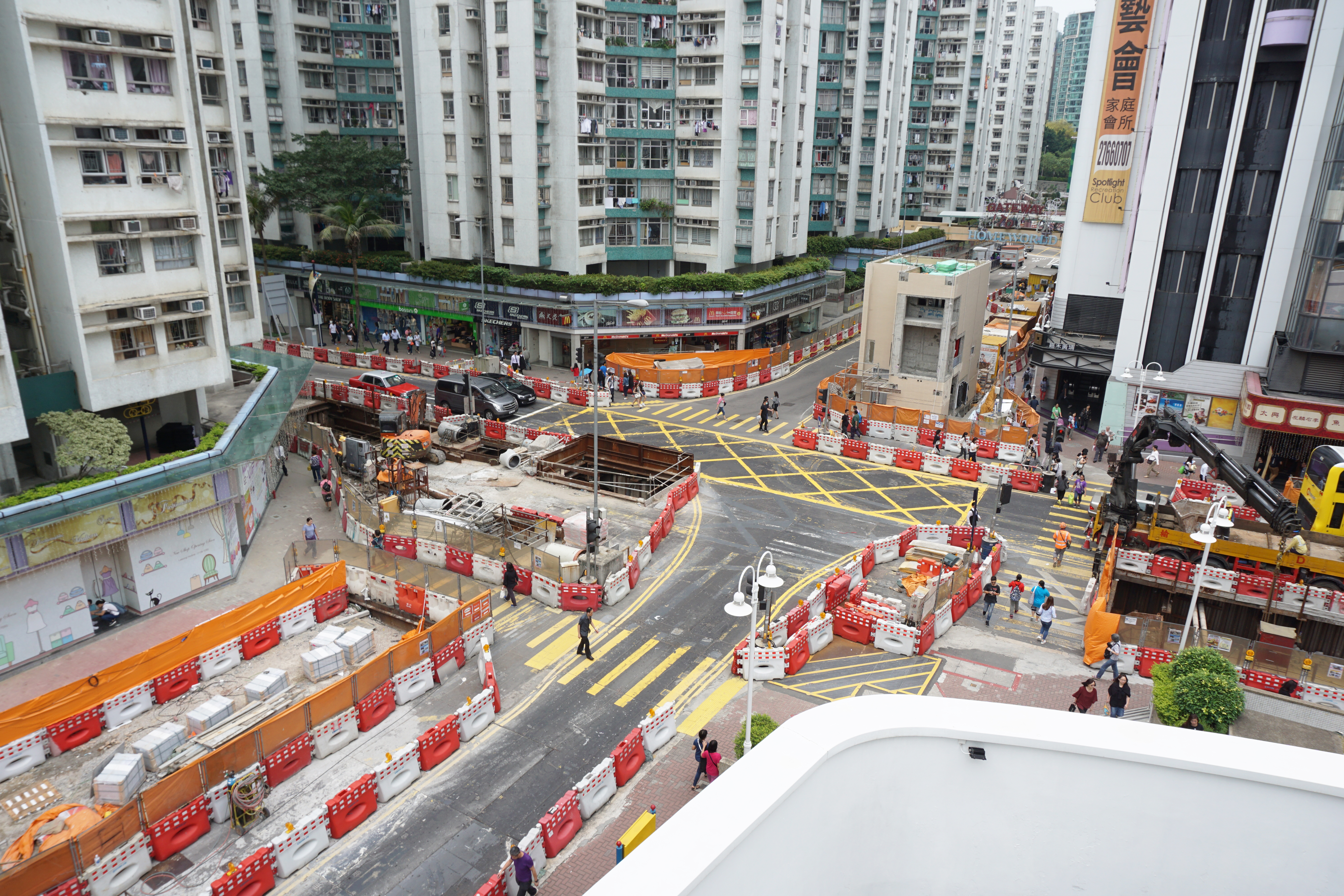
Construction of the Eastern concourse (May 2016)

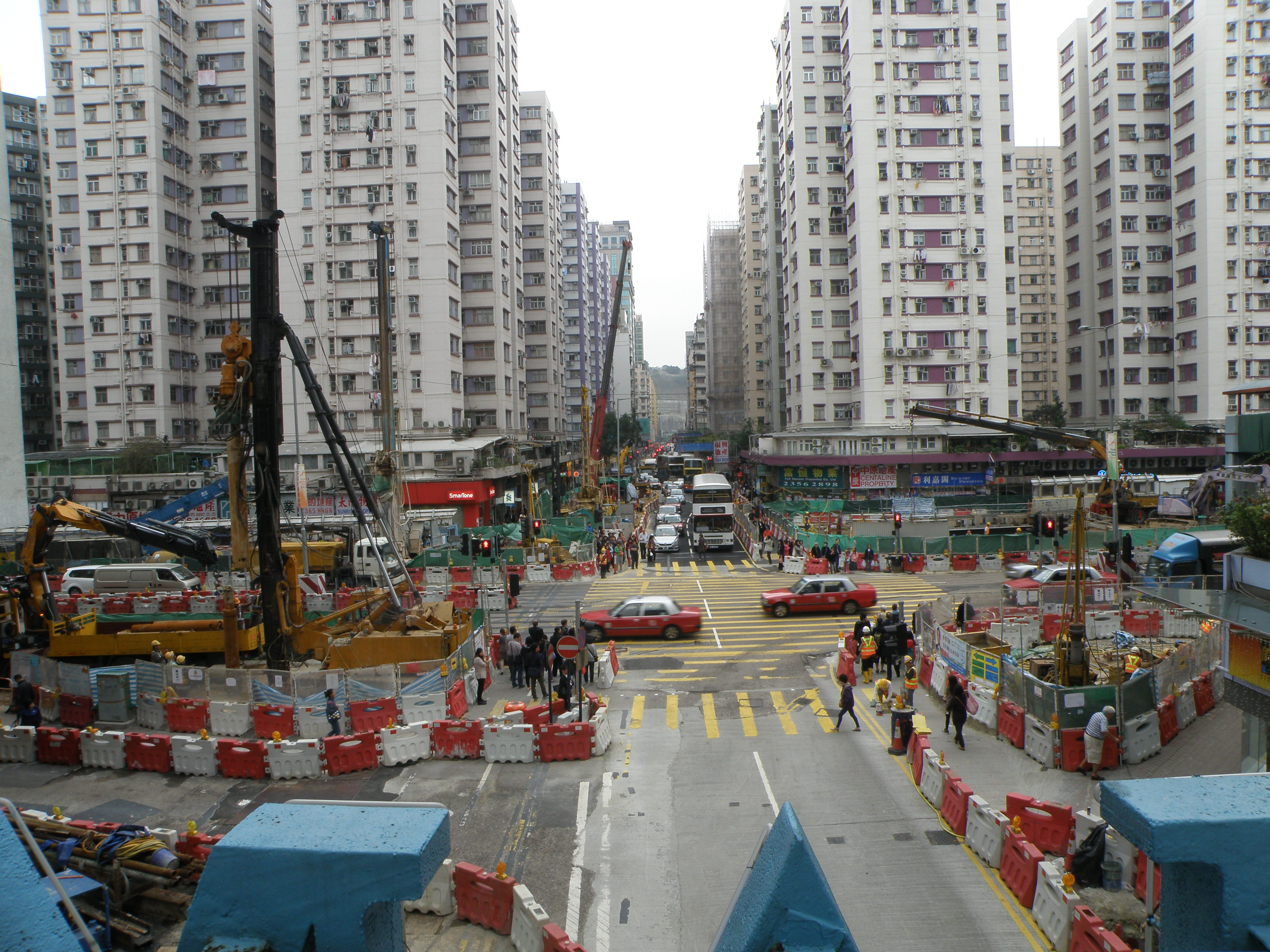
Construction of the Western concourse (April 2013)

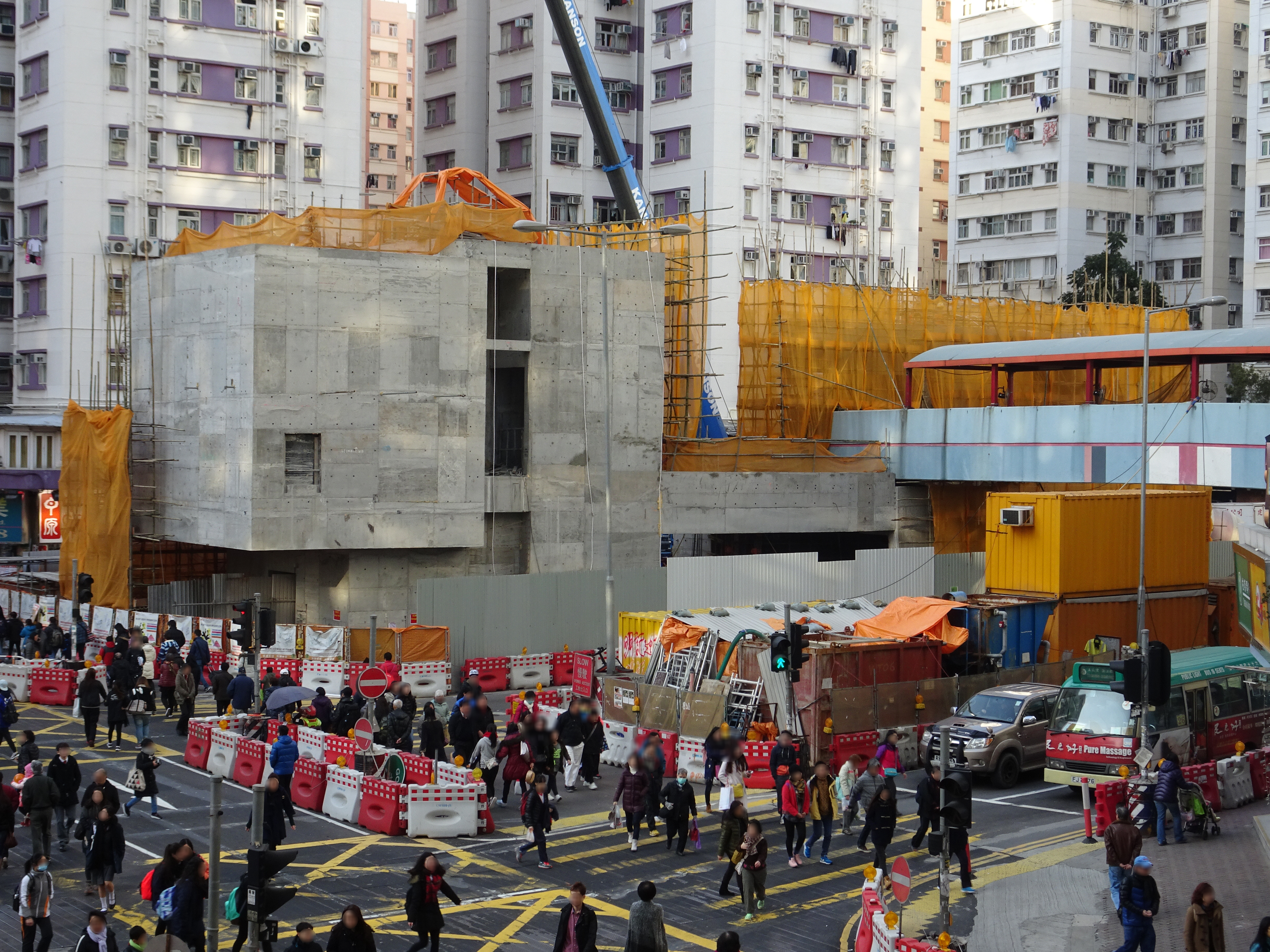
Construction of Exit A (January 2016)

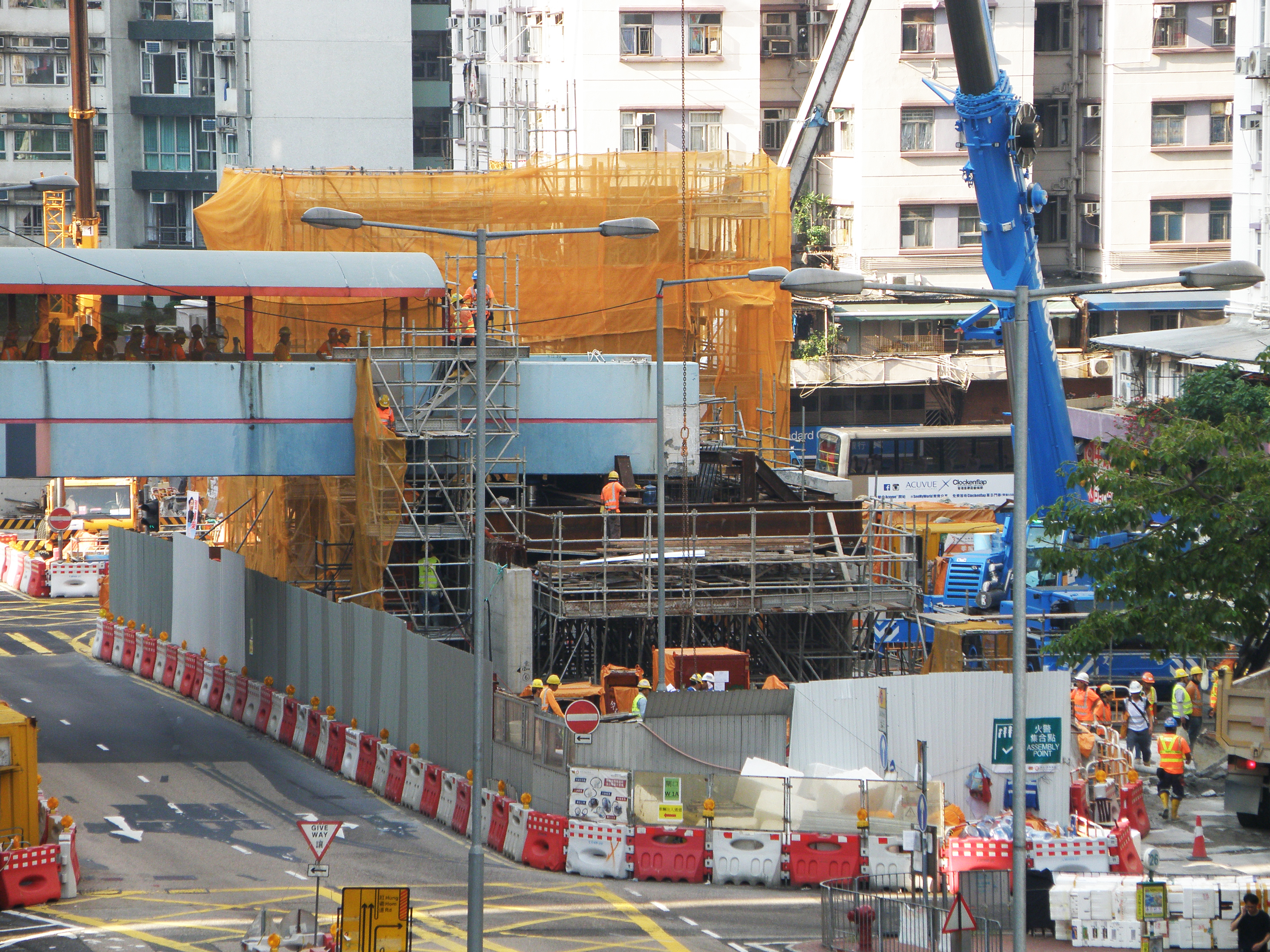
Construction of Exit A (October 2015)

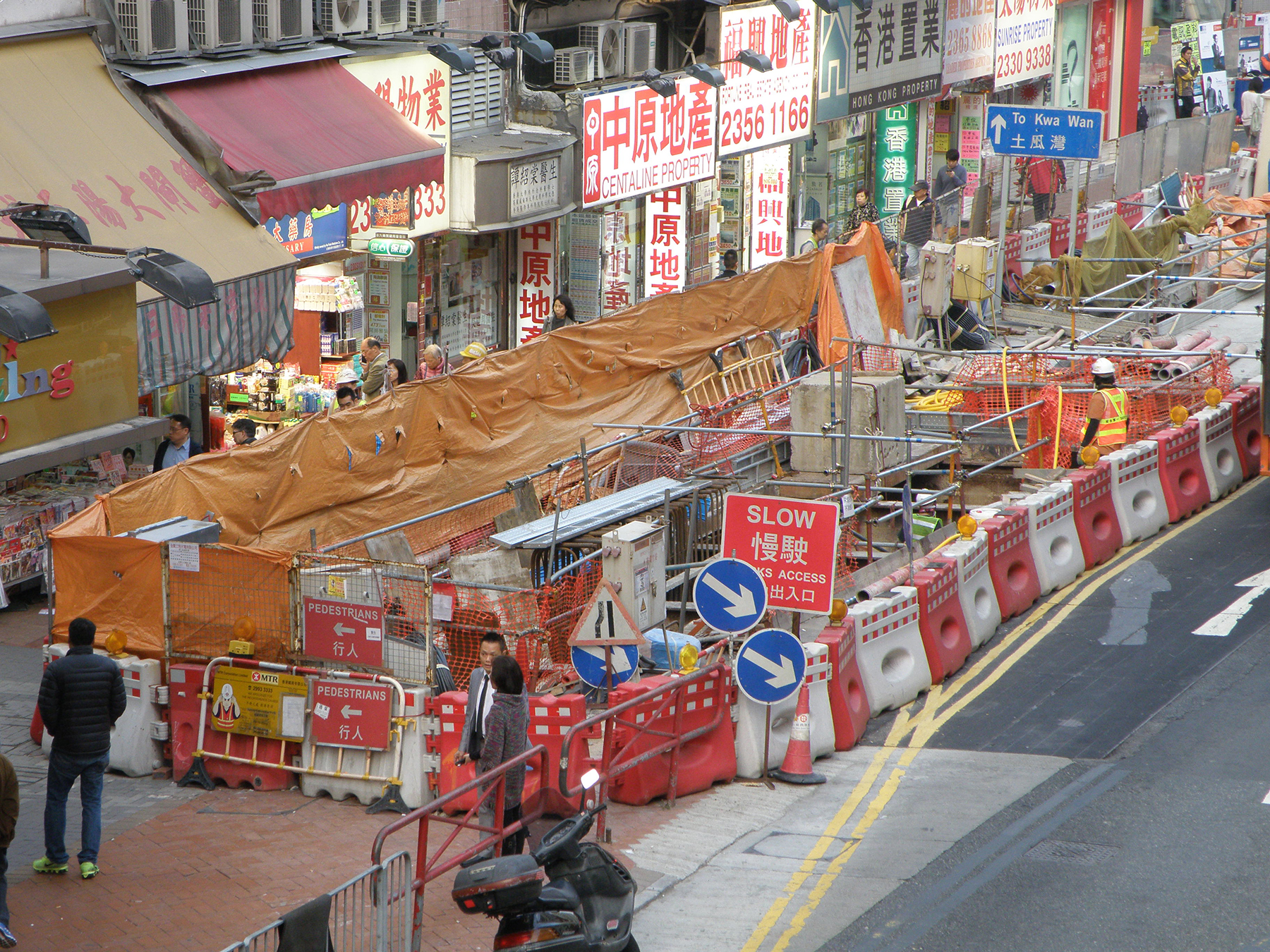
Construction of Exit B (February 2015)

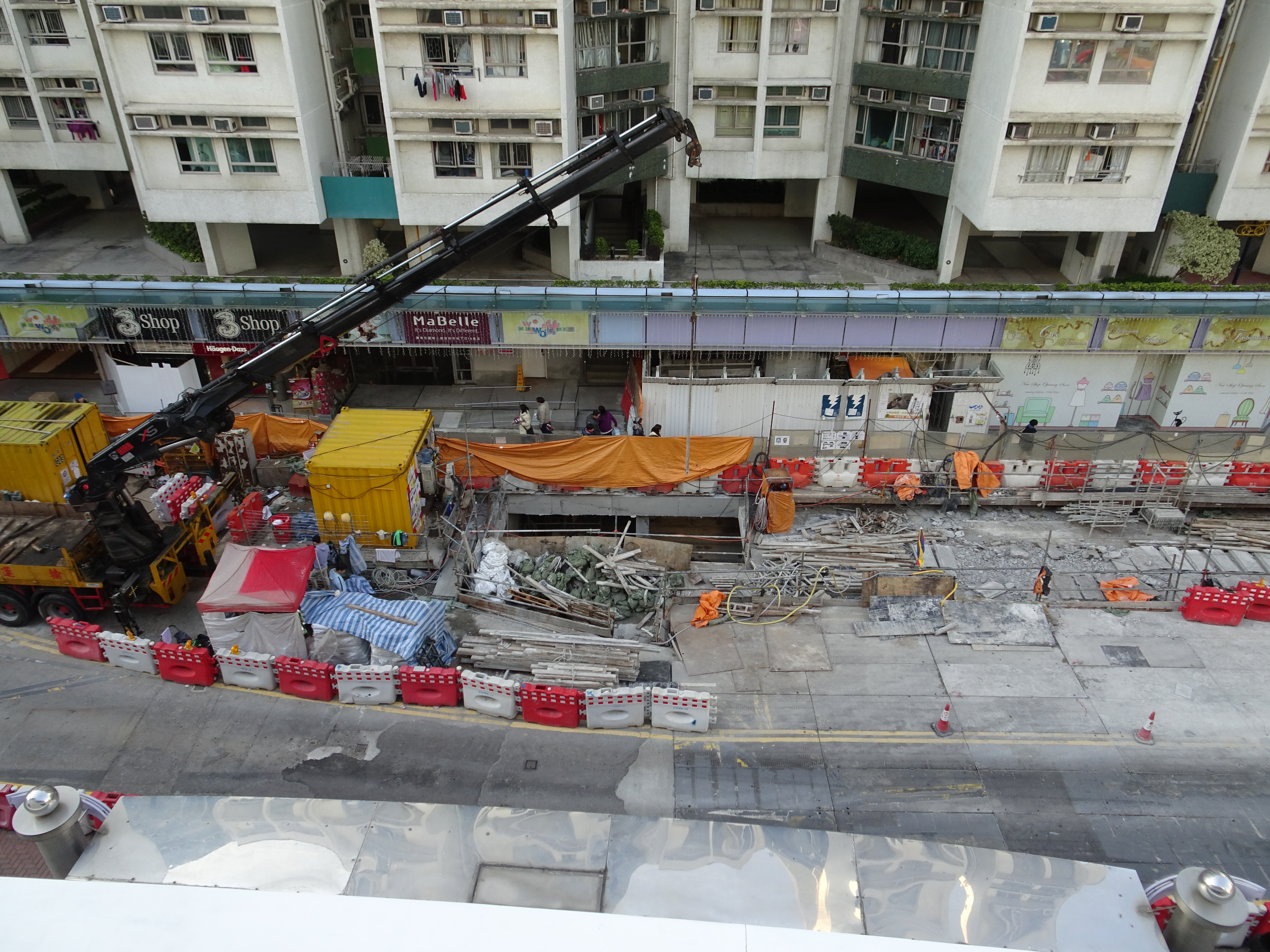
Construction of Exit C2 (January 2016)
