= Hung Hom =

Area of Kowloon Peninsula, Hong Kong

Hung Hom 紅磡
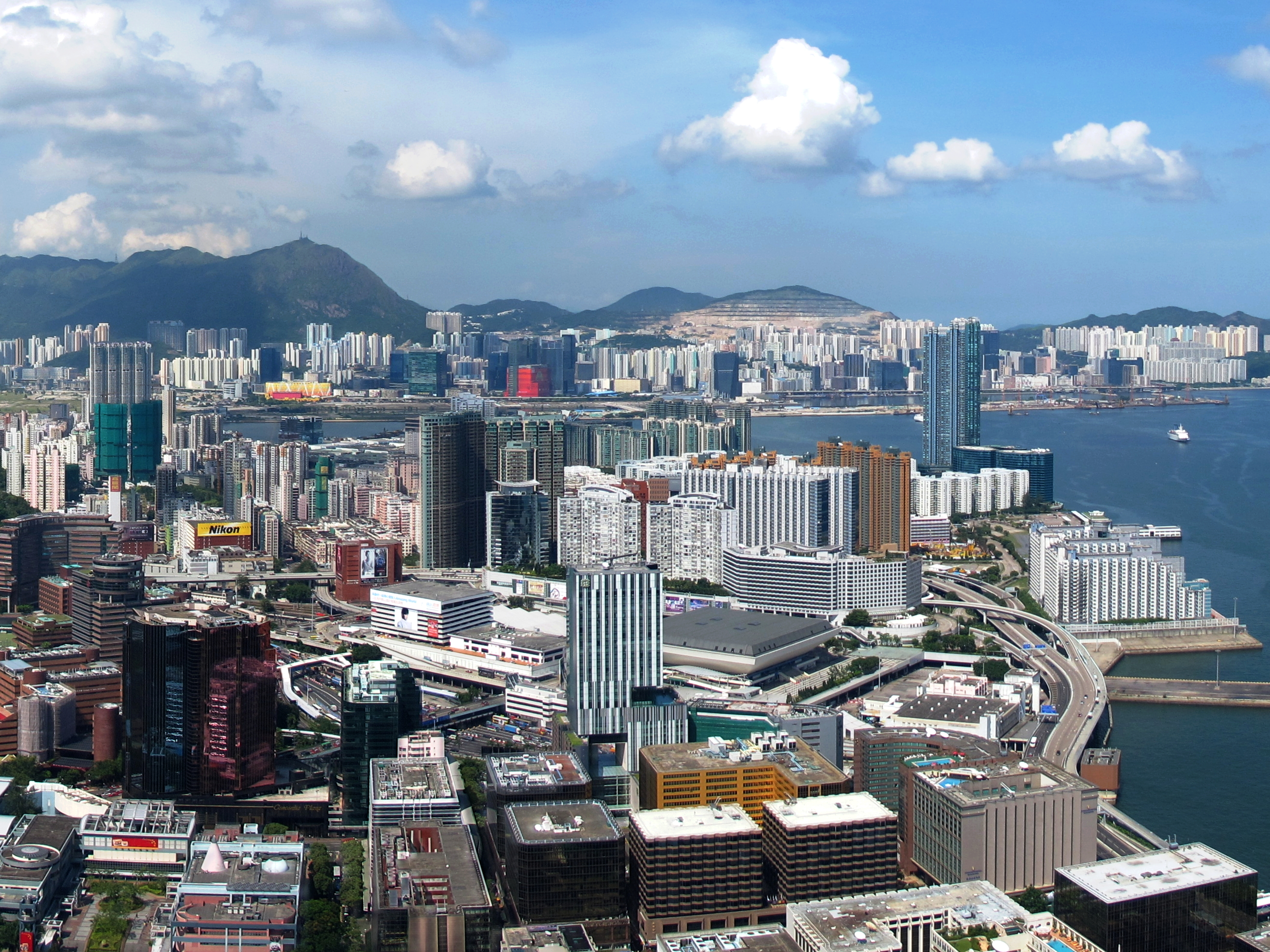
- Hung Hom, viewed looking east from Tsim Sha Tsui
- Interactive map of Hung Hom
- Coordinates: 22°18′13″N 114°10′58″E
- Country: Hong Kong
- Area: Kowloon
- District: Kowloon City District

Hung Hom
- Traditional Chinese: 紅磡
- Simplified Chinese: 红磡
- Cantonese Yale: Hùhngham
- Literal meaning: "Red Cliff"
Transcriptions
Standard Mandarin
- Hanyu Pinyin: Hóngkàn
- Gwoyeu Romatzyh: Horngkann
- IPA: [xʊ̌ŋ.kʰân]
Yue: Cantonese
- Yale Romanization: Hùhngham
- Jyutping: Hung4 ham3
- IPA: [hȍŋ.hɐ̄m]

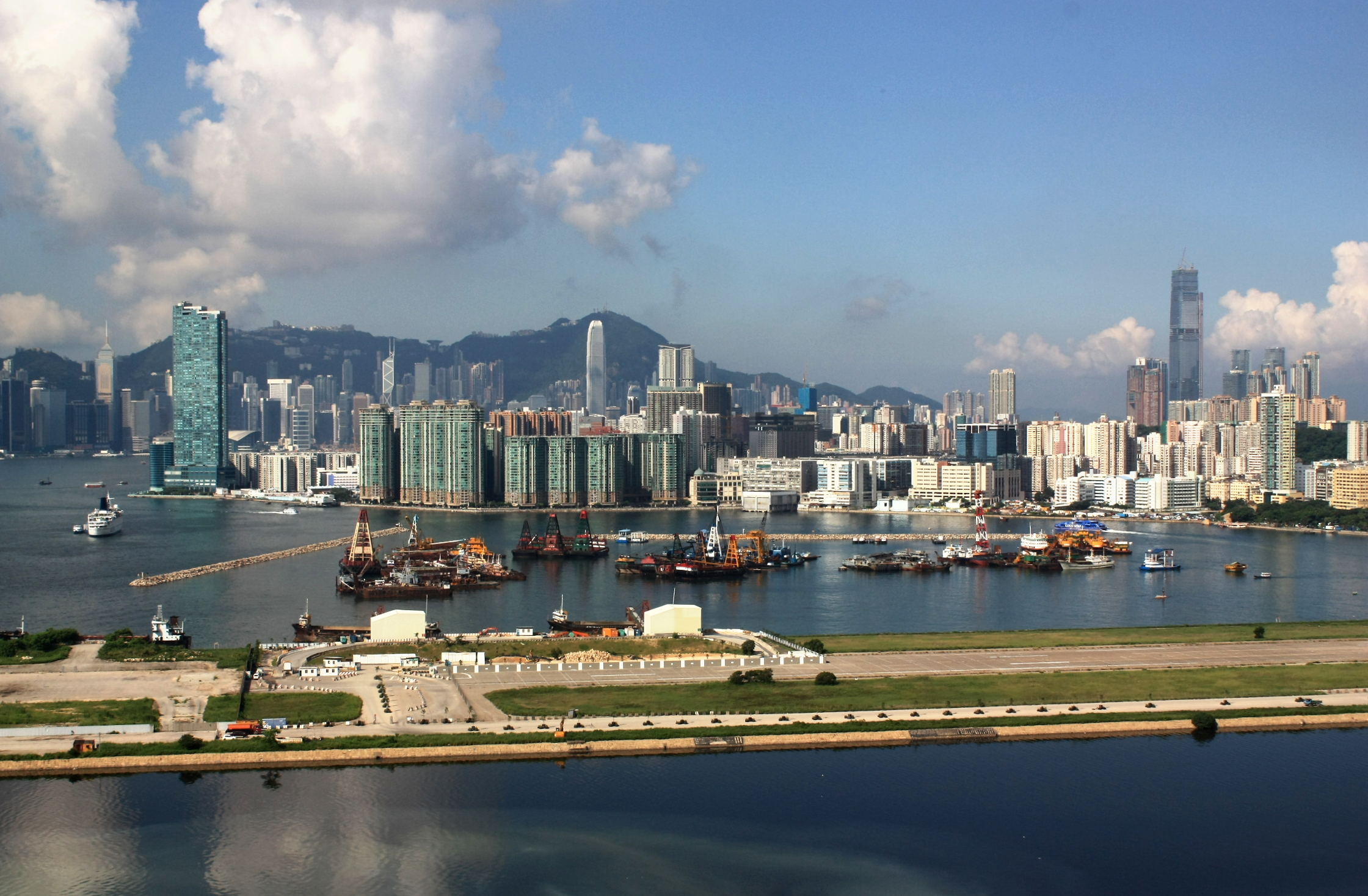
Hung Hom skyline in 2009, viewed from the east (Kwun Tong). The strip of land in the foreground is the former runway of the retired Kai Tak Airport.

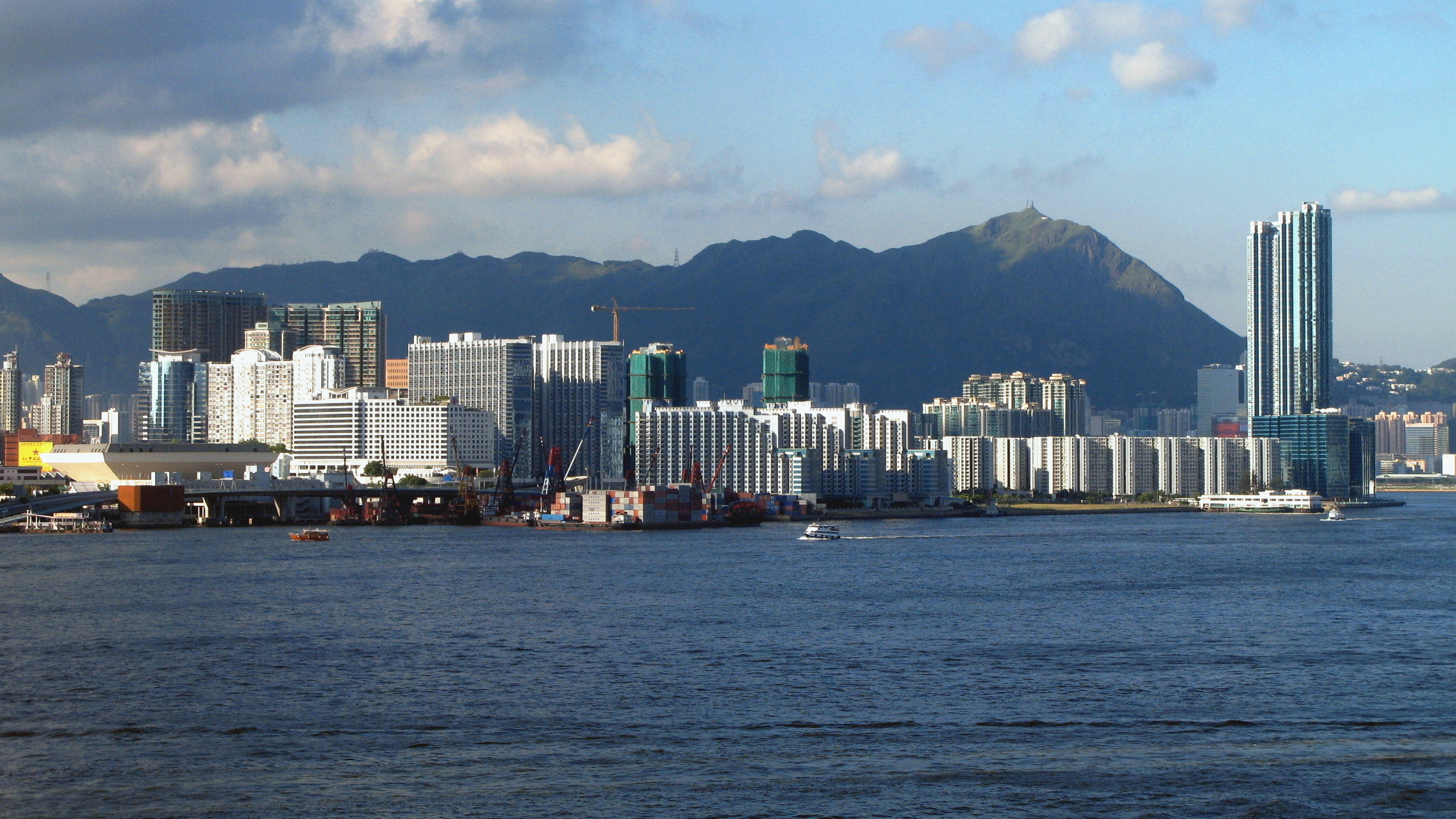
Hung Hom skyline in 2007, viewed from the south (Victoria Harbour)

Hung Hom (紅磡, Cantonese pronunciation: [hȍŋ hɐ̄m]) is an area in the southeast of Kowloon Peninsula, Hong Kong. The areas of Hung Hom Bay, Whampoa, Tai Wan, Hok Yuen, Lo Lung Hang and No. 12 Hill are administratively part of the Kowloon City District, while the South-West of Hung Hom Bay is under the Yau Tsim Mong District. Hung Hom serves mainly residential purposes, but has some industrial buildings in the north.

== Geography ==
Hung Hom is in the southeast of the Kowloon Peninsula. It is bordered by Victoria Harbour in the south, King's Park in the west, No. 12 Hill, Hok Yuen and the valley Lo Lung Hang in the north.

== History ==
Originally, Hung Hom was much smaller than the present-day context. Hung Hom Bay has been partially reclaimed several times since 1850, expanding the area of Hung Hom as a consequence. Rumsey Rock, formerly located in the bay, was buried in the reclamation process. Later a town was developed eastward parallel to the Hong Kong and Whampoa Dock.

Hung Hom was renamed to "Yamashita District" (山下區) during the Japanese occupation from 1941 to 1945. It was one of the few places to be renamed.

== Education ==
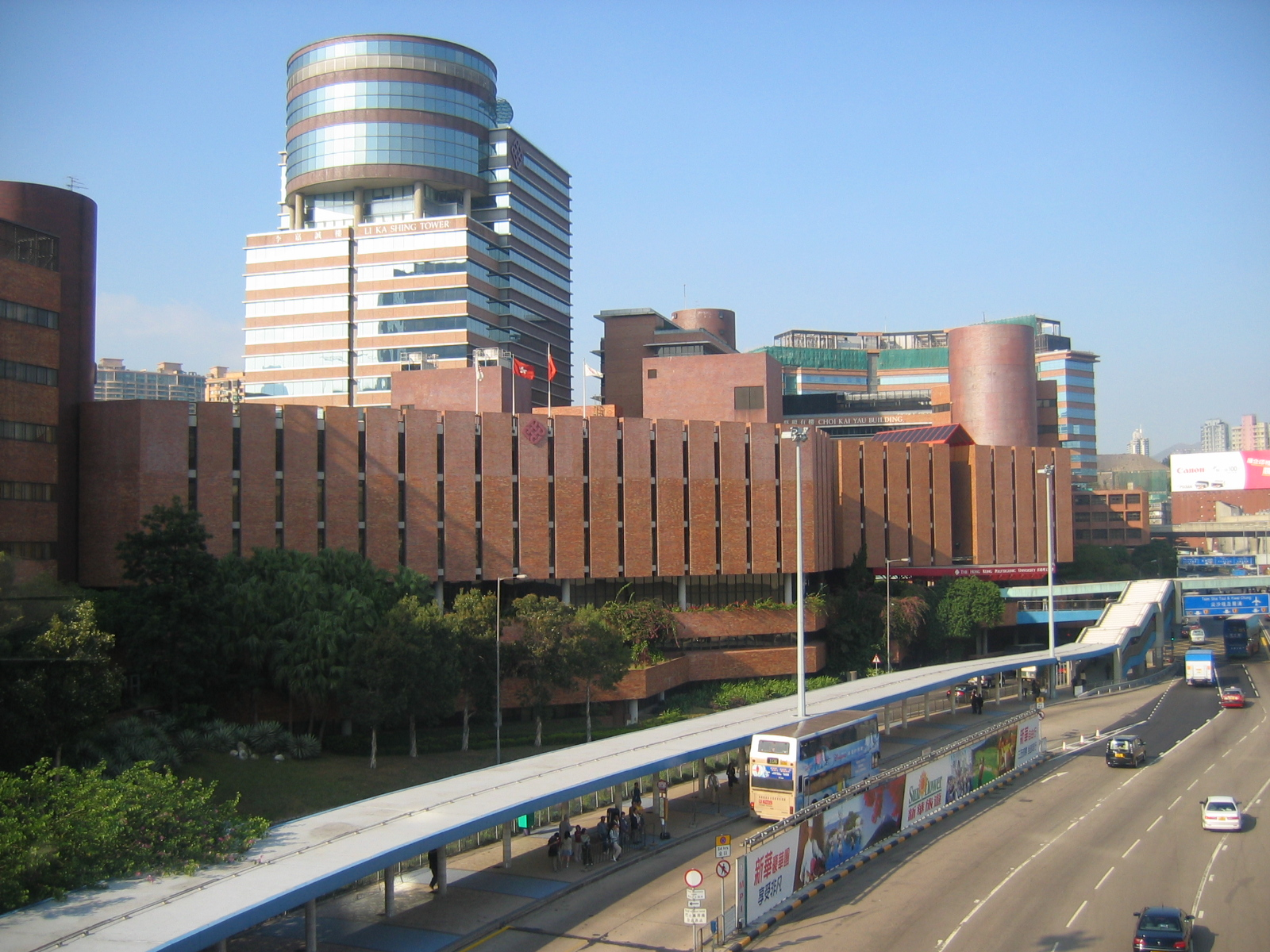
Hong Kong Polytechnic University and Hong Chong Road

- Holy Angels Canossian School
- Holy Carpenter Secondary School
- Hong Kong Community College (Hung Hom Bay campus)
- Hong Kong Polytechnic University
- Ma Tau Chung Government Primary School (Hung Hom Bay)

Hung Hom is in Primary One Admission (POA) School Net 35. Within the school net are multiple aided schools (operated independently but funded with government money) and Ma Tau Chung Government Primary School (Hung Hom Bay).

Hong Kong Public Libraries maintains the Hung Hom Public Library in the Hung Hom Municipal Services Building.

=== Former schools ===
- Hung Hom Government Primary School - Later used as the Kowloon Junior School Hung Hom Campus, and the French International School of Hong Kong Hung Hom Campus.
- French International School of Hong Kong (Victor Segalen) Hung Hom Campus
- Kowloon Junior School (English Schools Foundation) Hung Hom Campus

== Residential ==
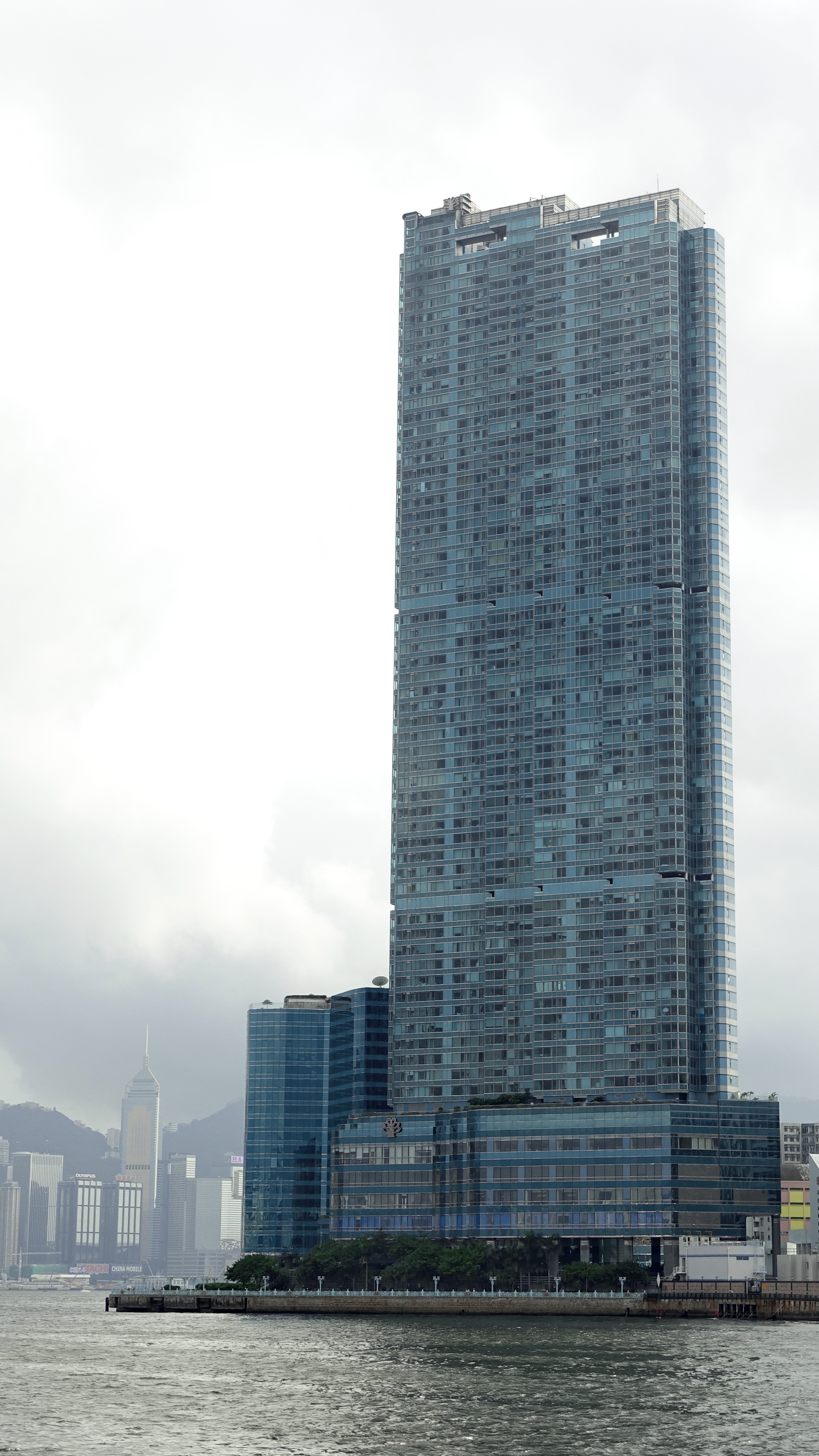
The Harbourfront Landmark

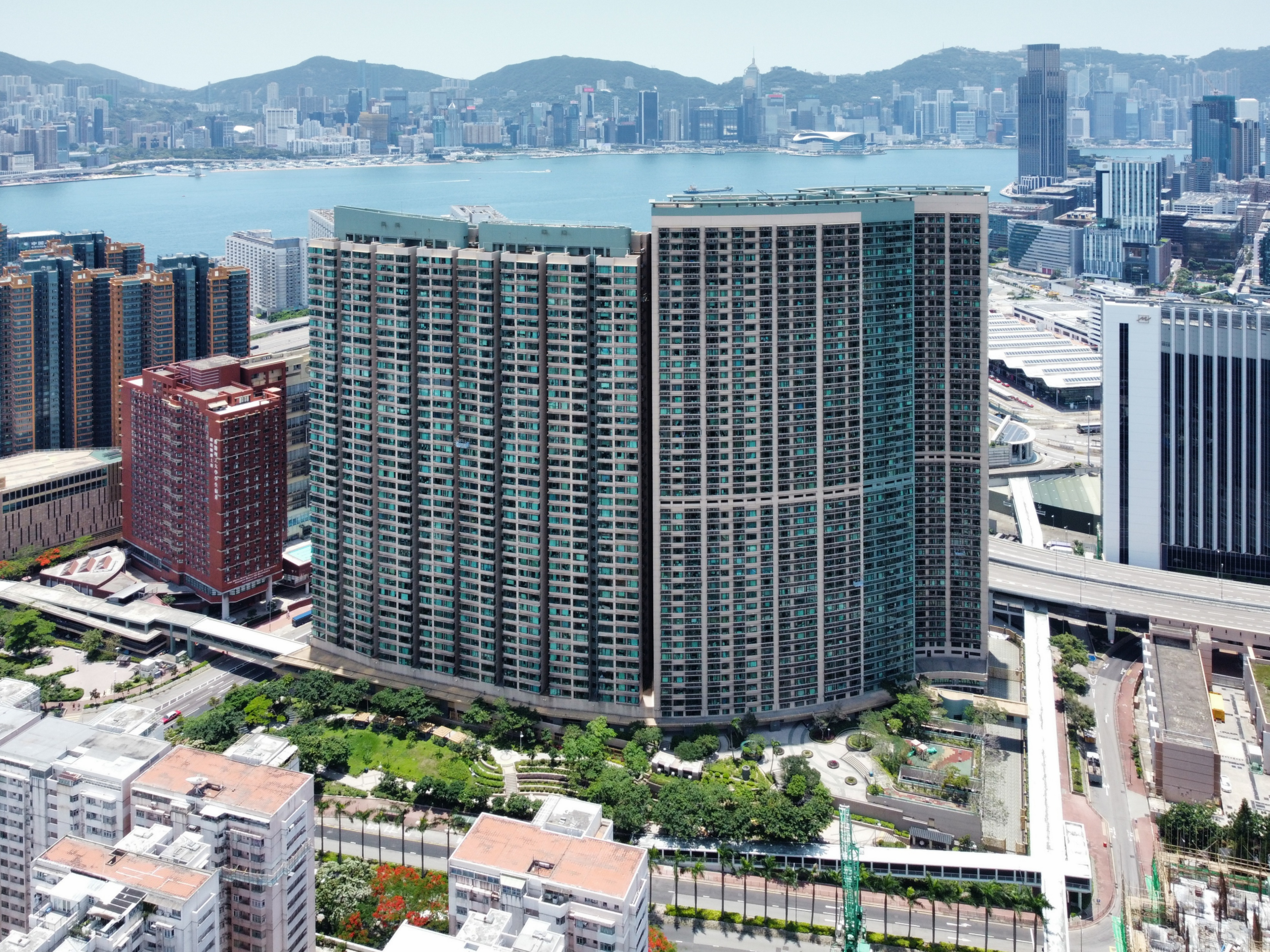
Royal Peninsula

- Chatham Gate
- Harbour Place
- Harbourfront Horizon
- Harbourview Horizon
- The Harbourfront Landmark
- Hunghom Bay Centre
- Hunghom Gardens
- La Lumiere
- Laguna Verde
- The Metropolis Residence
- Royal Peninsula
- Stars by the Harbour
- Star Ruby
- The Vantage
- Whampoa Estate
- Whampoa Garden
- Public housing estates in Hung Hom

== Facilities ==
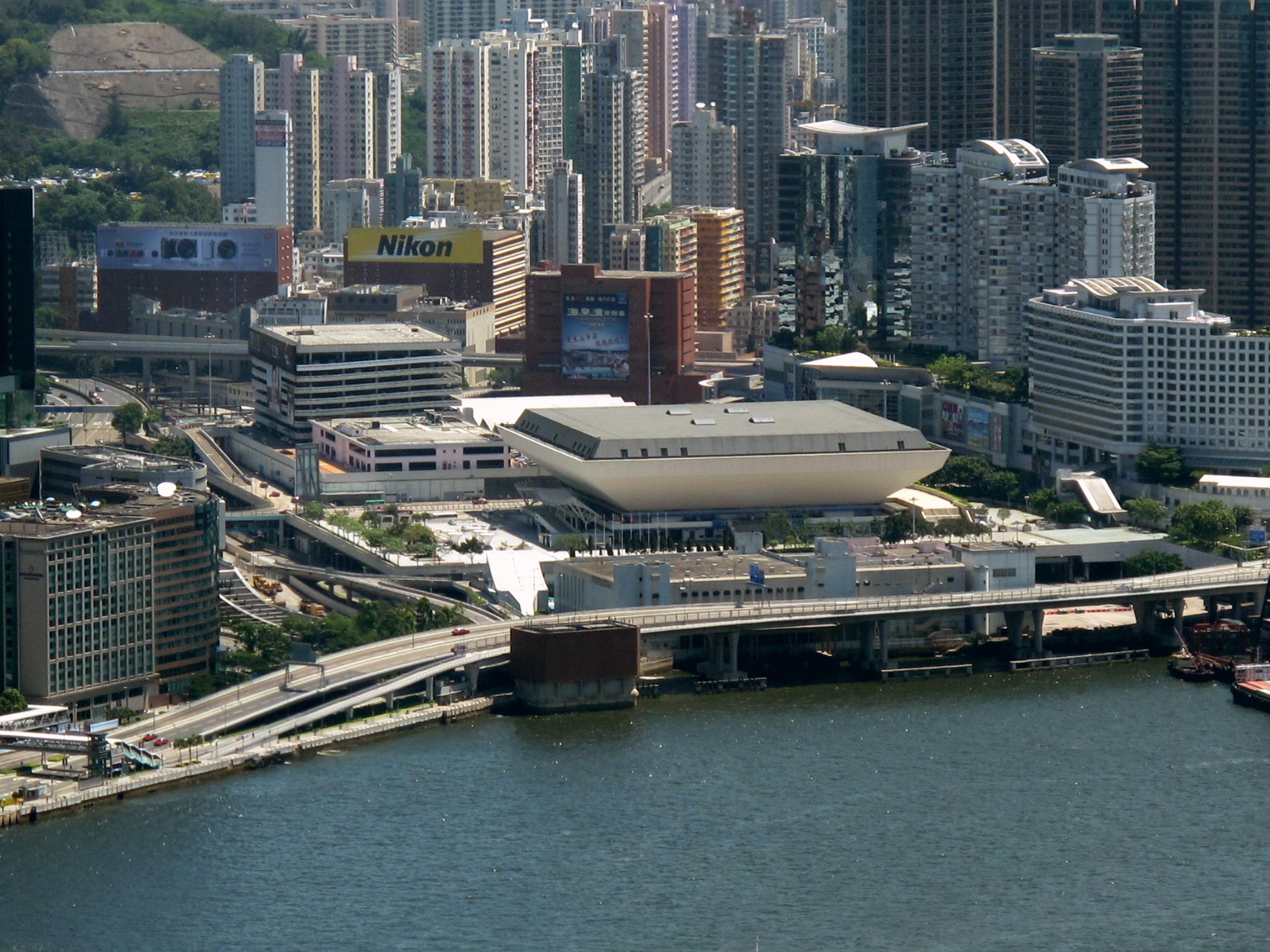
The Hong Kong Coliseum

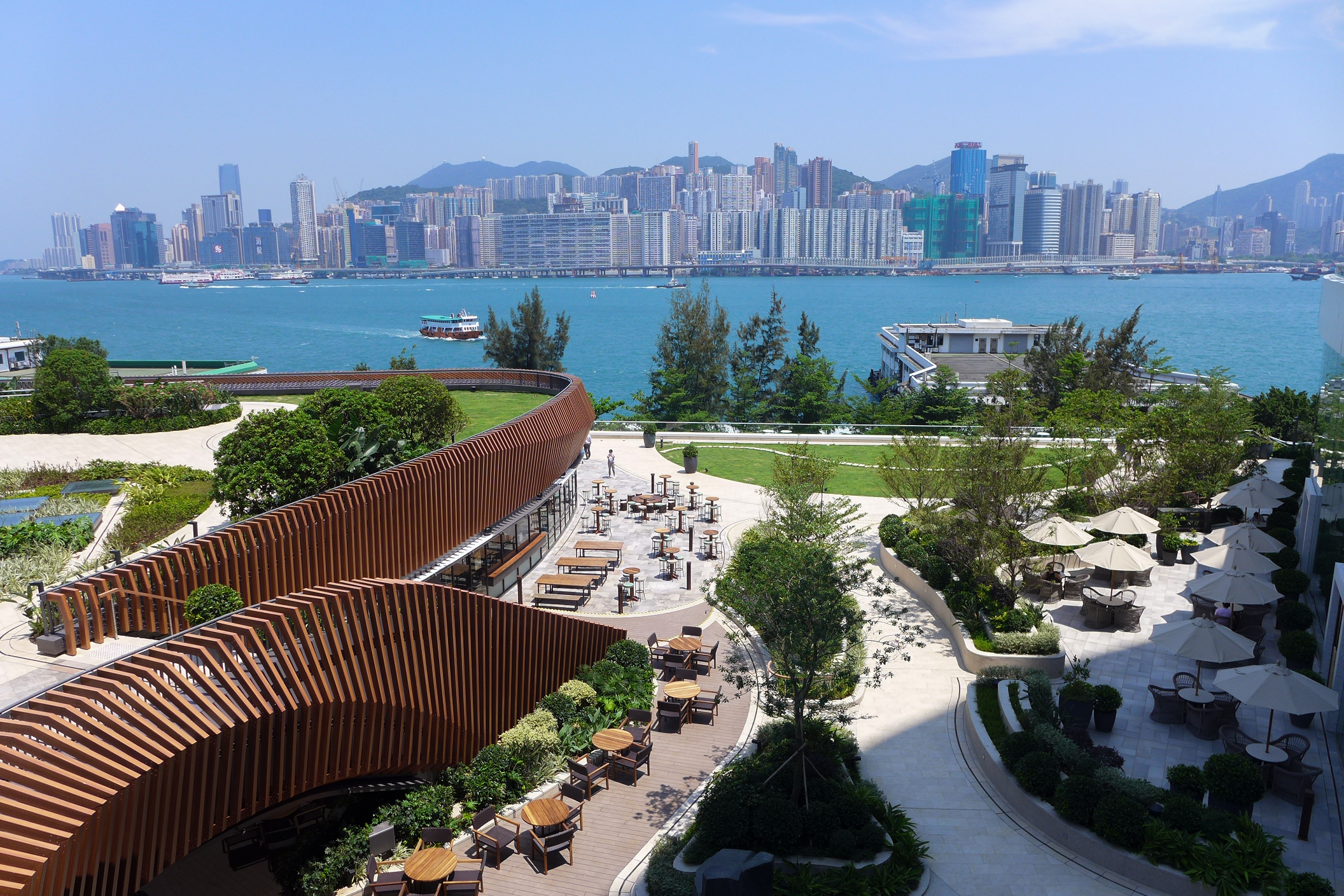
Kerry Hotel Hong Kong open space

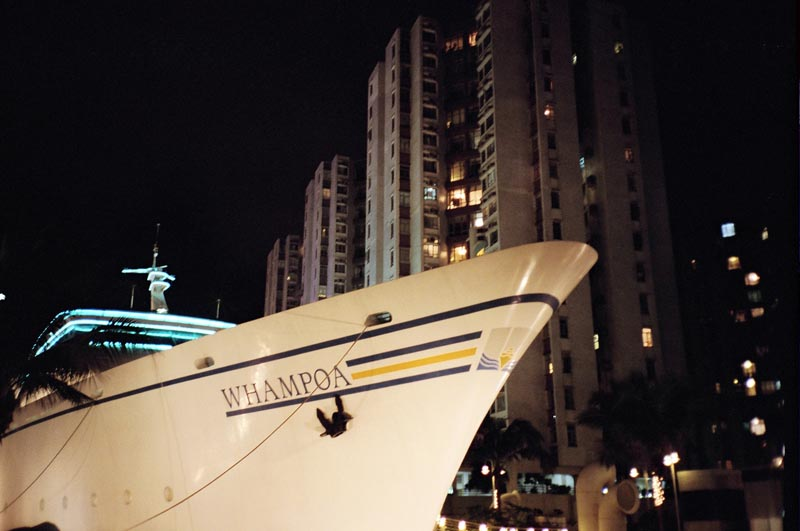
The Whampoa is the landmark of Whampoa Garden shopping centre, an AEON Style department store is located in its basement.

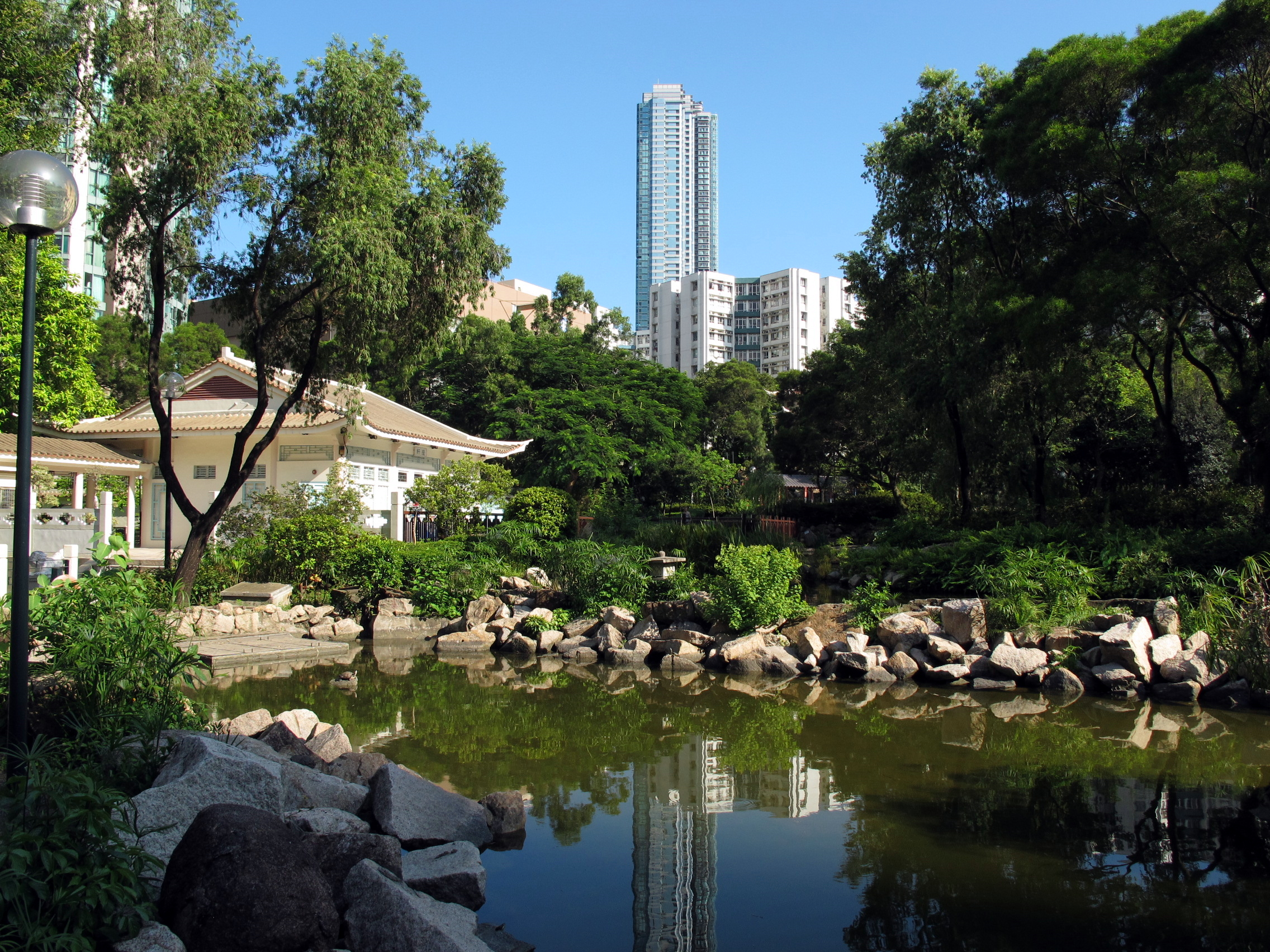
Hutchison Park

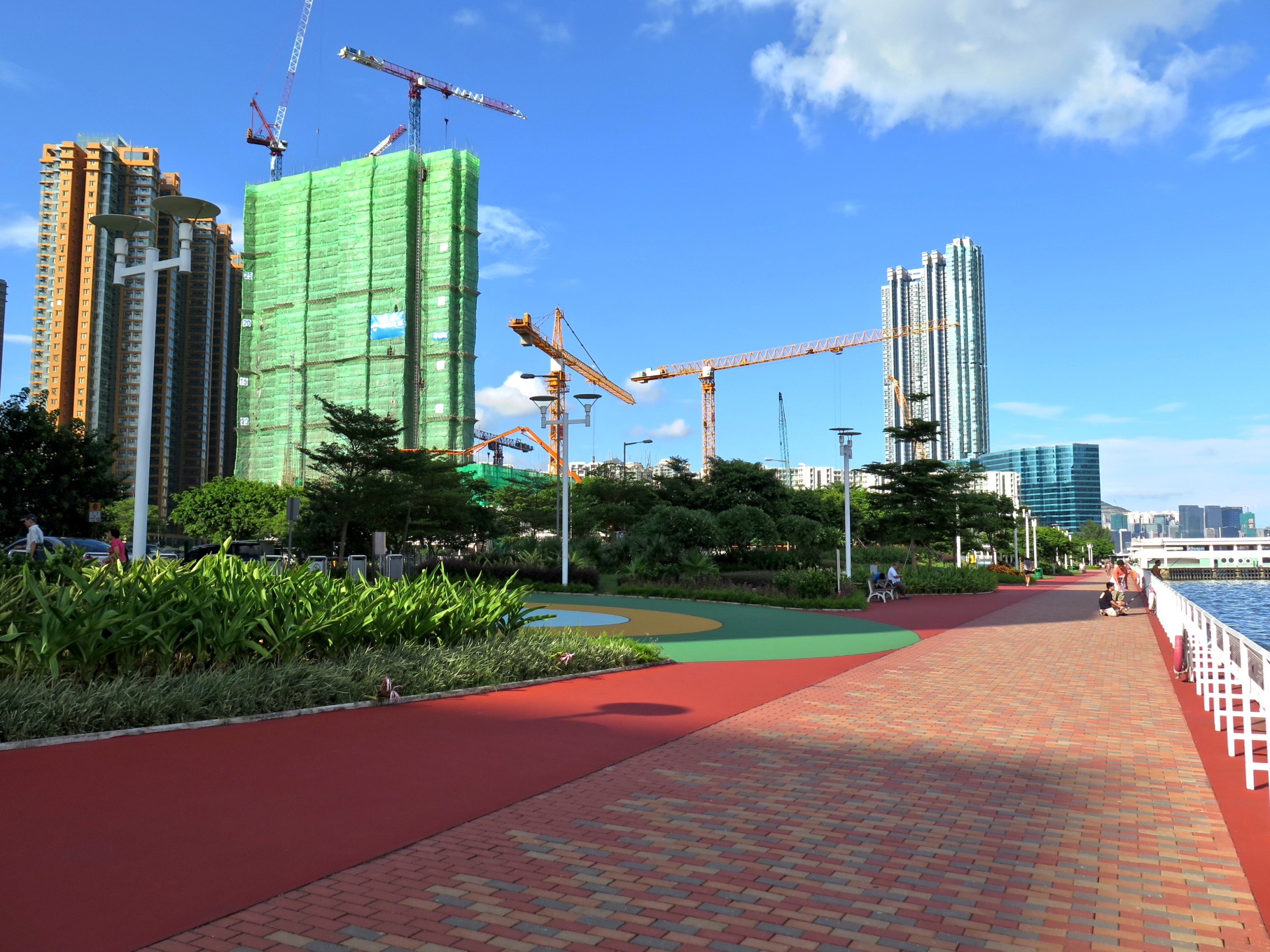
Hung Hom Promenade

- Hong Kong Coliseum
- Hung Hom Municipal Building, which includes the Hung Hom Library, Hung Hom Municipal Building Sports Centre, and the Hung Hom Market with a cooked food centre
- Hung Hom Fire Station
- Two post offices and the International Mail Centre
- Hutchison Park, a small park located in a built up residential area once occupied by docklands and fill-in to create more land for residential use.
- Tai Wan Shan Park, Tai Wan Shan Swimming Pool
- Hung Hum Promenade
- Hong Kong Police Traffic Kowloon West Base
- Fortune Metropolis, a shopping mall in Hung Hom Bay
- The Whampoa, a shopping centre in Whampoa Garden
- Lux Theatre
- Hotels, including Kerry Hotel Hong Kong, Harbour Grand Kowloon and Harbour Plaza Metropolis

== Religion ==
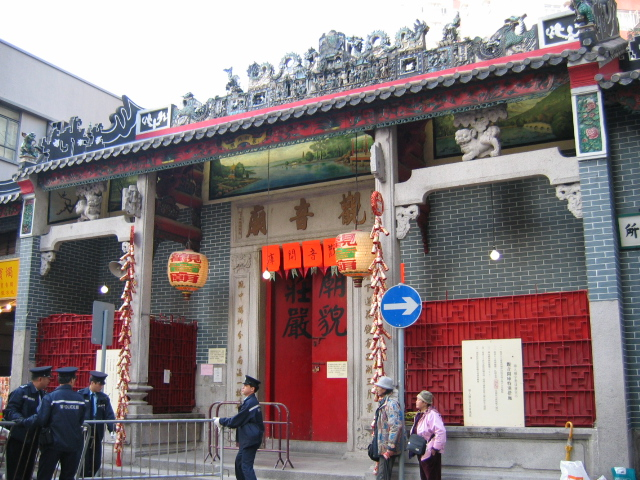
Hung Hom Kwun Yum Temple

- Kwun Yum Temple. Built in 1873. Grade II historic building
- Pak Tai Temple, located at No. 146 Ma Tau Wai Road. Built in 1876. Grade III historic building
- Holy Carpenter Church (Anglican)
- St. Mary's Church (Catholic)
- True World Lutheran Church

== Transport ==
=== MTR ===
Hung Hom is served by the Hung Hom station of the MTR. The station serves both the East Rail line and Tuen Ma line. This station also previously played host to the Intercity Through Train (and the KTT) serving neighboring Guangdong province and other major cities in mainland China.

As of October 2016, Ho Man Tin station and Whampoa station as part of an extension of the Kwun Tong line, are available for accessing the Hung Hom area.

=== Tunnel ===
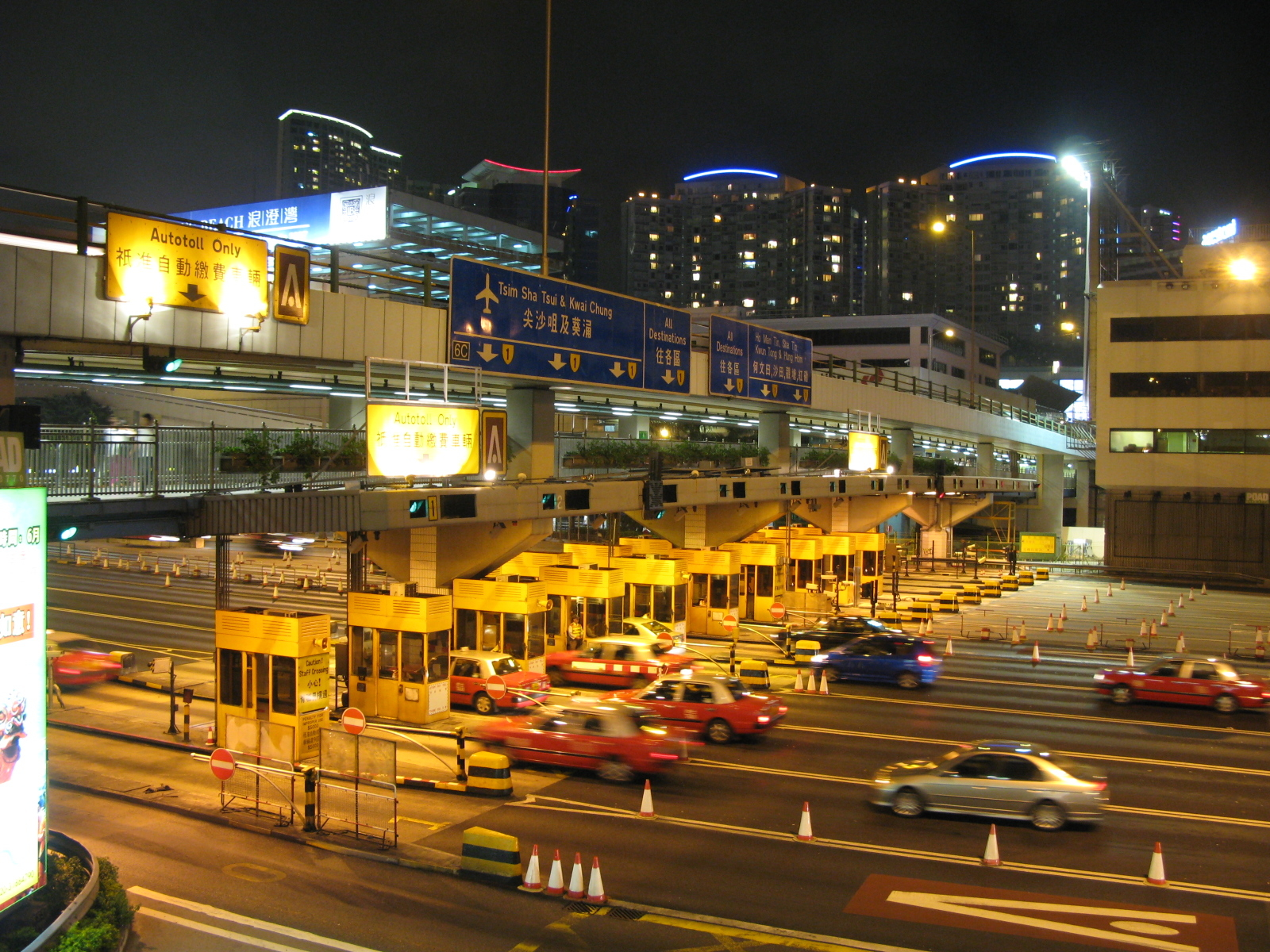
Toll plaza of the Cross-Harbour Tunnel at Hung Hom

The Cross-Harbour Tunnel, part of Route 1, was the first road tunnel in Hong Kong that was built under water. It opened on 2 August 1972, and it connects Hong Kong Island and Kowloon at Kellett Island and a reclaimed site at Hung Hom Bay, respectively.

=== Ferries ===
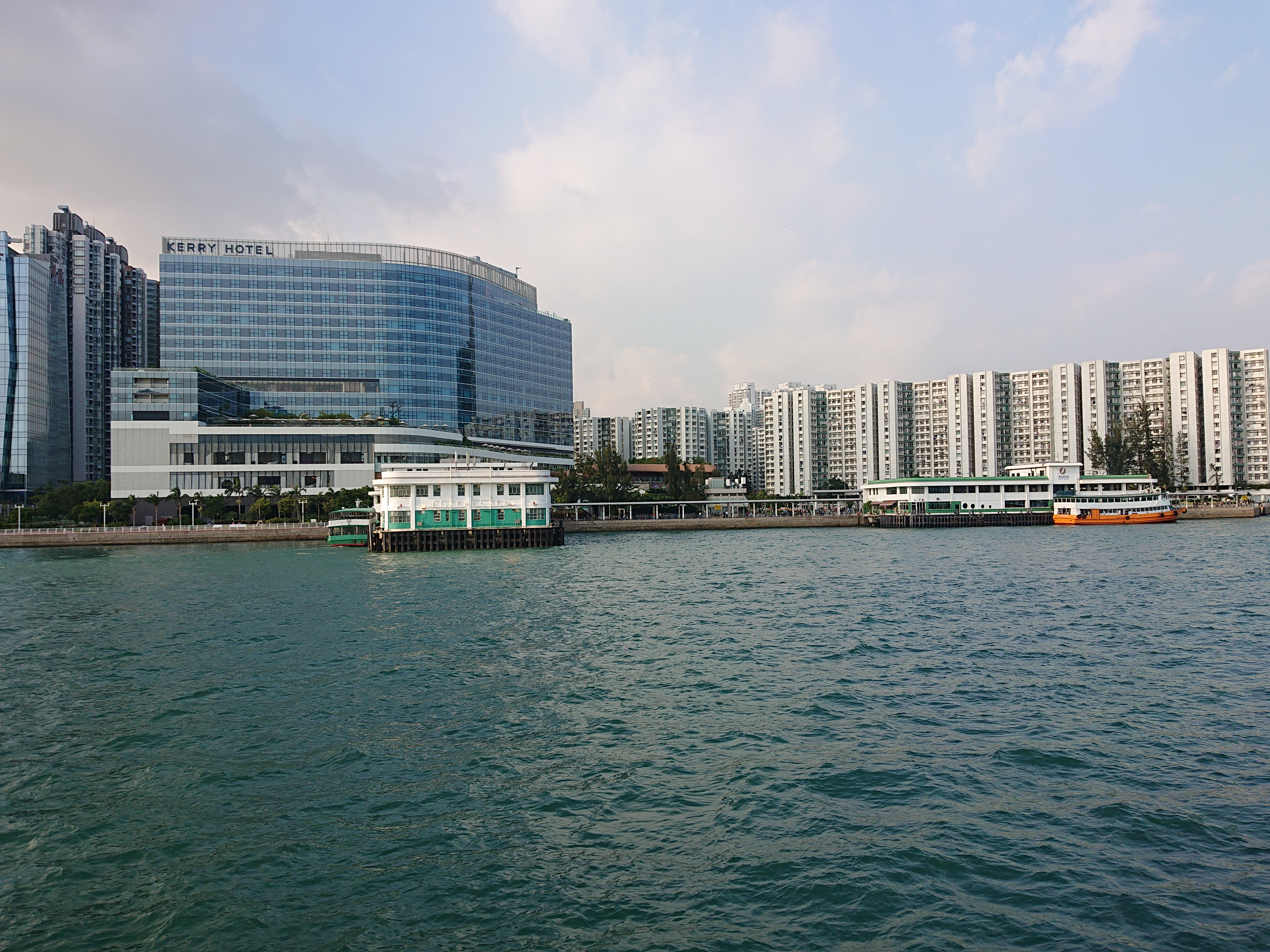
Hung Hom Ferry Pier

Ferries serving Hung Hom Ferry Pier:

- New World First Ferry: North Point Ferry Pier - Hung Hom Ferry Pier (HK$6.5)
- Fortune Ferry: Central Ferry Pier - Hung Hom Ferry Pier (HK$9)

=== Buses ===
There are three bus terminals in Hung Hom. Many buses serve the area.

  - Solely-operated cross harbour route: 108
  - Cross harbour routes operated with Citybus: 101, 101R, 101X, 102, 102P, 102R, 103, 104, 106, 106A, 106P, 107, 107P, 109, 110, 111, 111P, 112, 113, 115, 115P, 116, 117, 118, 118P, 170, 171, 182, N118, N121, N122, N170, N182;
  - Non-cross harbour routes: 2E, 3B, 5, 5A, 5C, 5D, 6C, 6F, 7B, 8, 8A, 8P, 11, 11K, 11X, 12A, 12P, 13X, 14, 15, 15X, 21, 26, 28, 30X, 45, 85S, 85X, 87C, 87D, 93K, 98D, 219X, 224X, 230X, 241X, 260X, 268B, 269B, 271S, 287D, 296D, 297, 297P, N41X, N216, N241, N271, N281;
- New World First Bus: 796X.
- Citybus: A20, A21, A22, A25, E21X, E23, E23A, N11, N23, NA20.
- Minibus routes: 2, 2A, 6, 6A, 6X, 8, 13.

== See also ==
- List of places in Hong Kong
