= Hung Hom Ferry Pier =

Ferry pier in Kowloon, Hong Kong

Coordinates: 22.30042°N 114.18933°E

- Traditional Chinese: 紅磡碼頭
- Simplified Chinese: 红磡码头
Transcriptions
Standard Mandarin
- Hanyu Pinyin: Hóngkàn Mǎtóu
Yue: Cantonese
- Jyutping: hung4 ham3 maa5 tau4

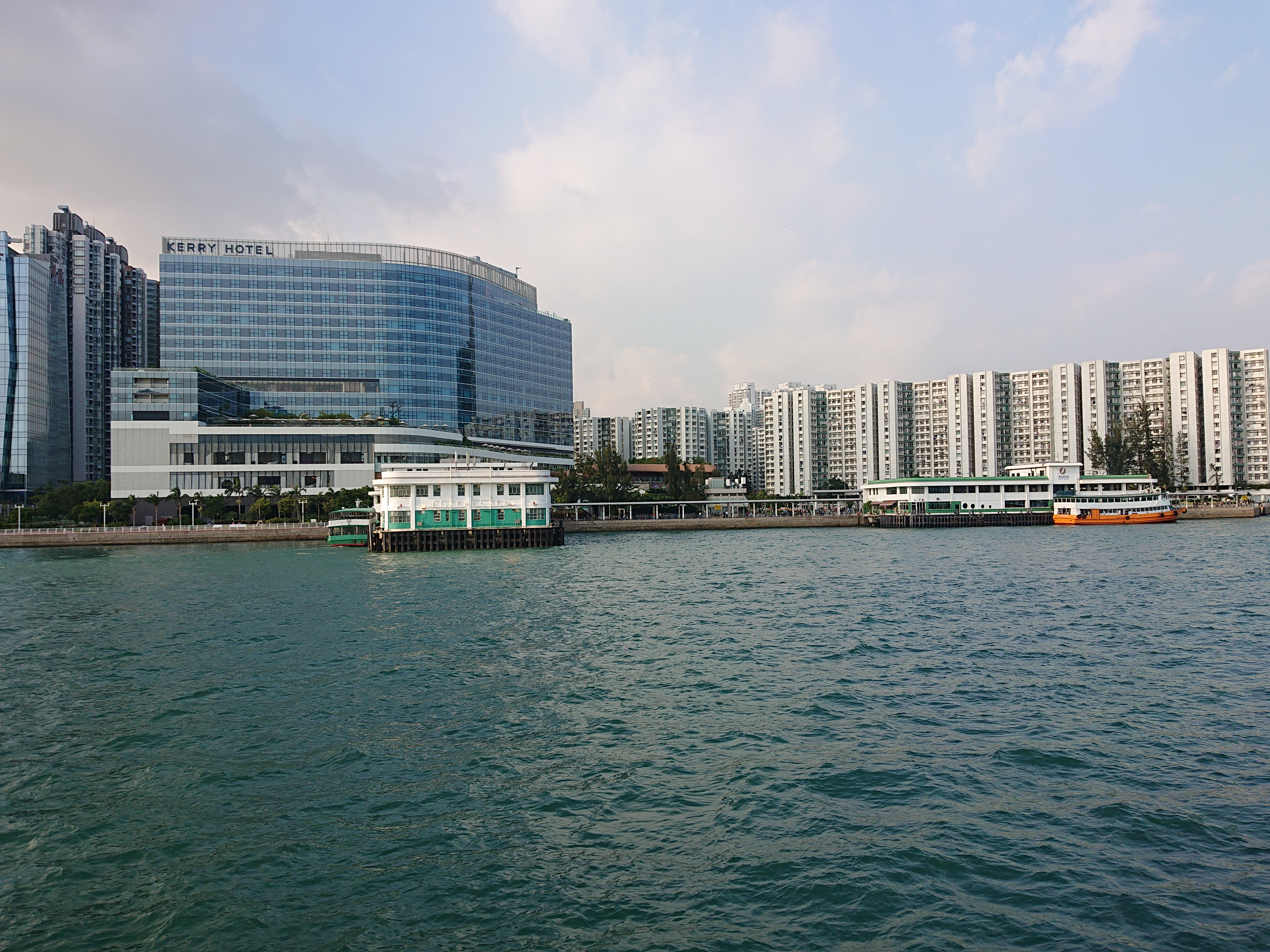
Hung Hom Ferry Piers viewed from Victoria Harbour

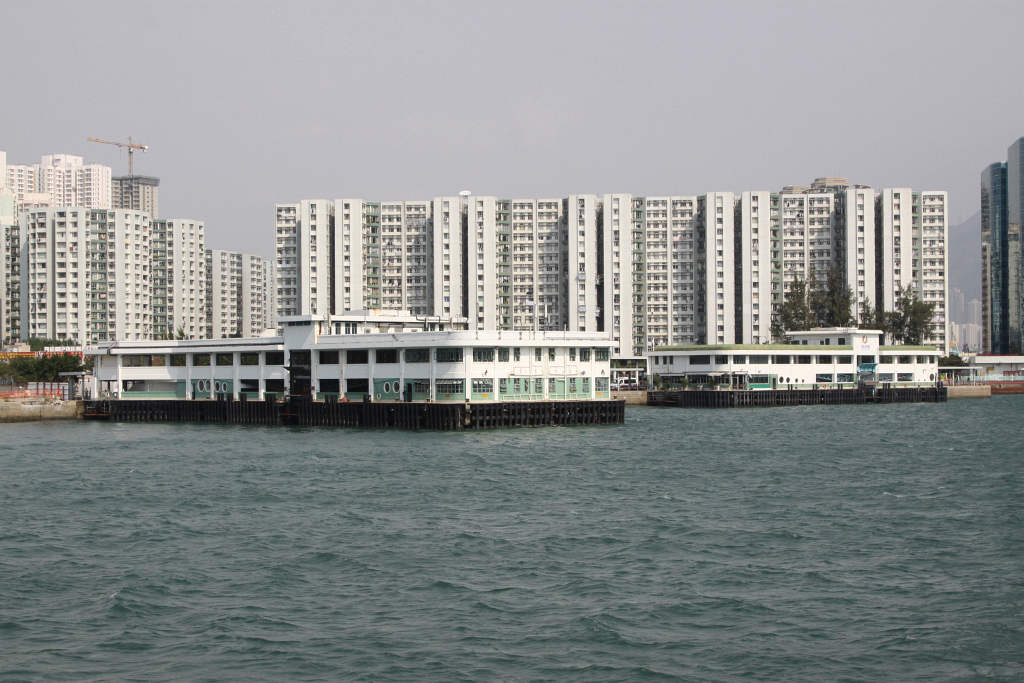
Hung Hom Ferry Pier: west (Star Ferry) berth to the left in December 2010

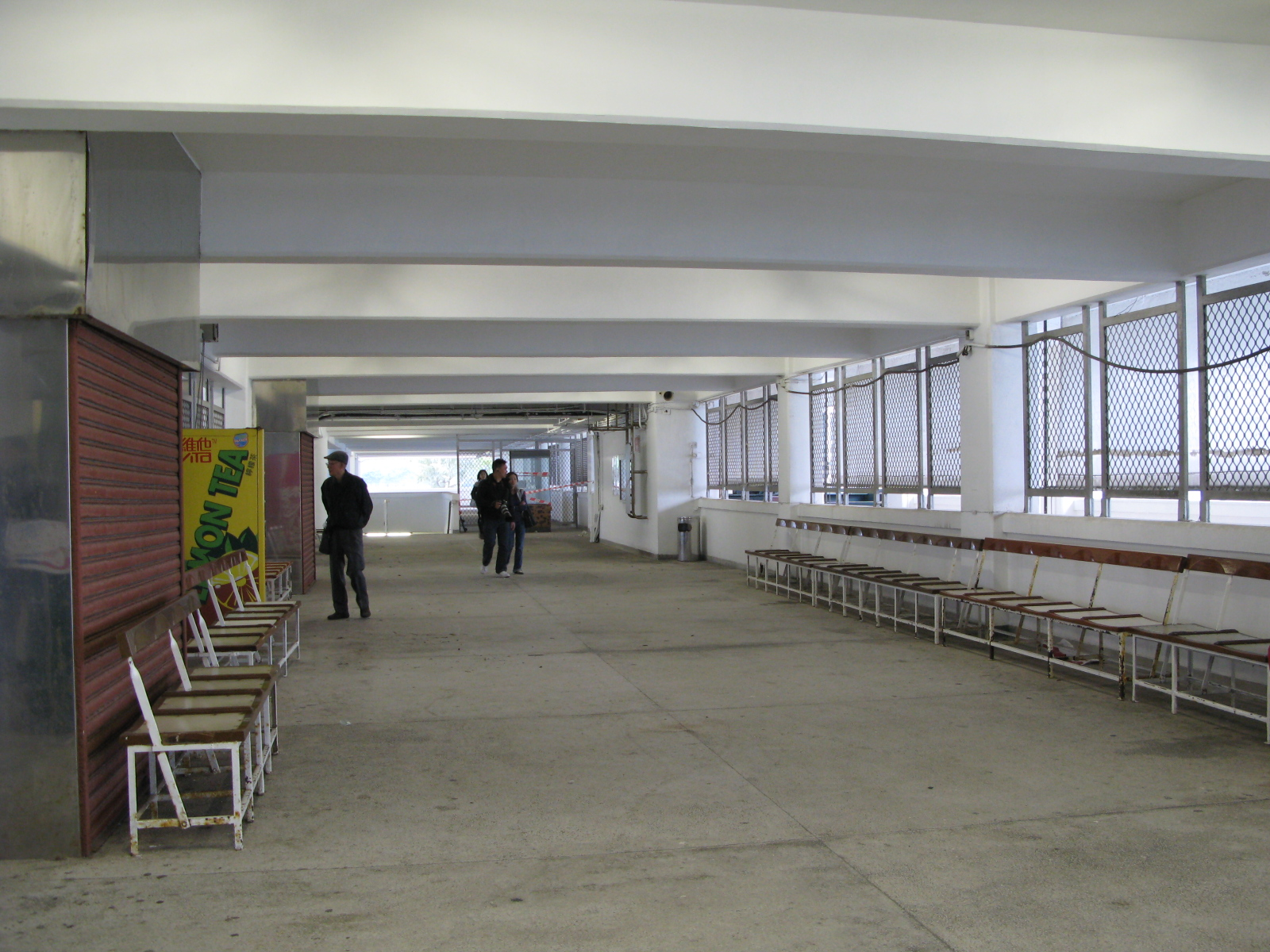
Pier Waiting Area in March 2011

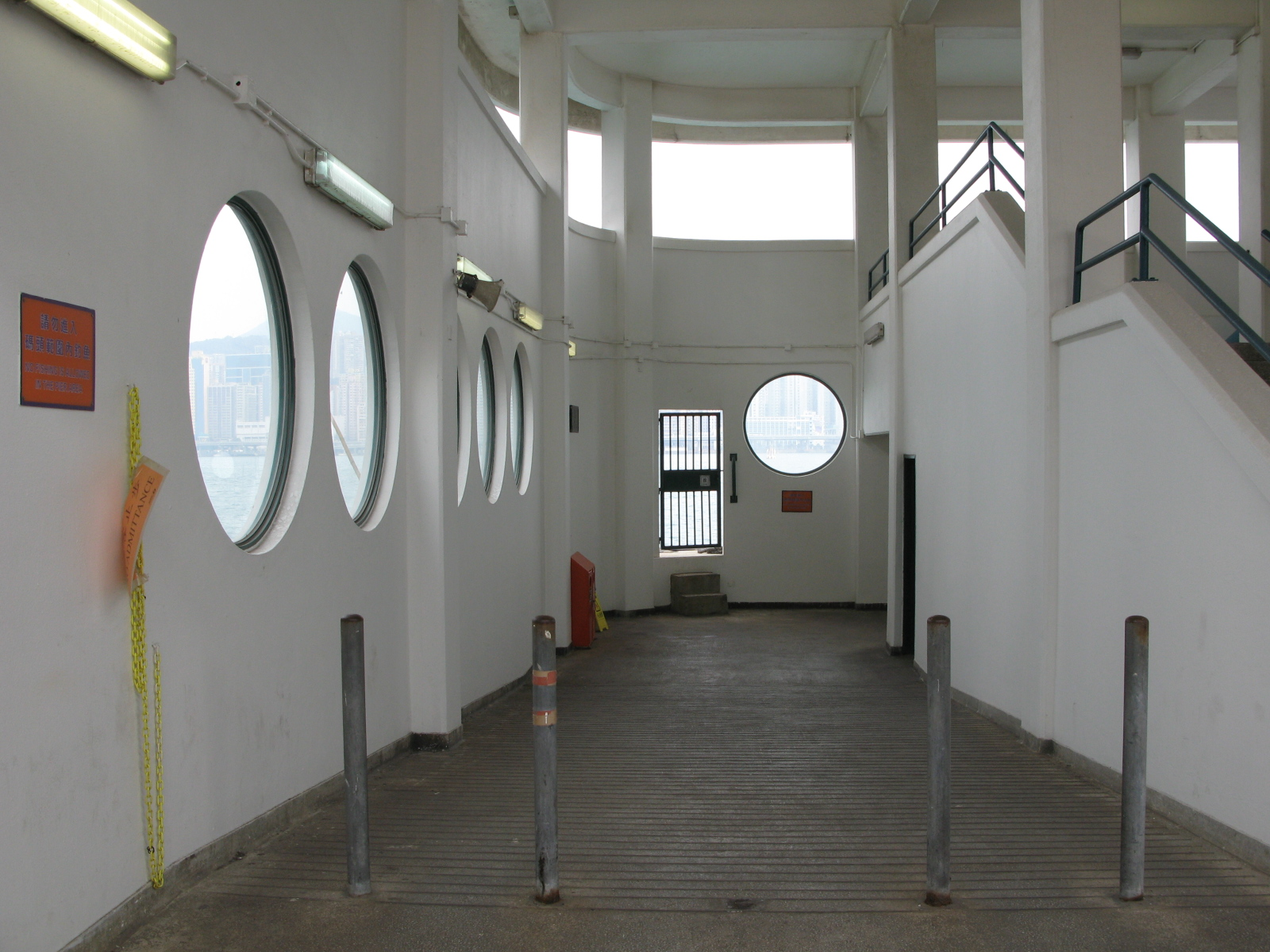
Pier Windows used the circle design in March 2011

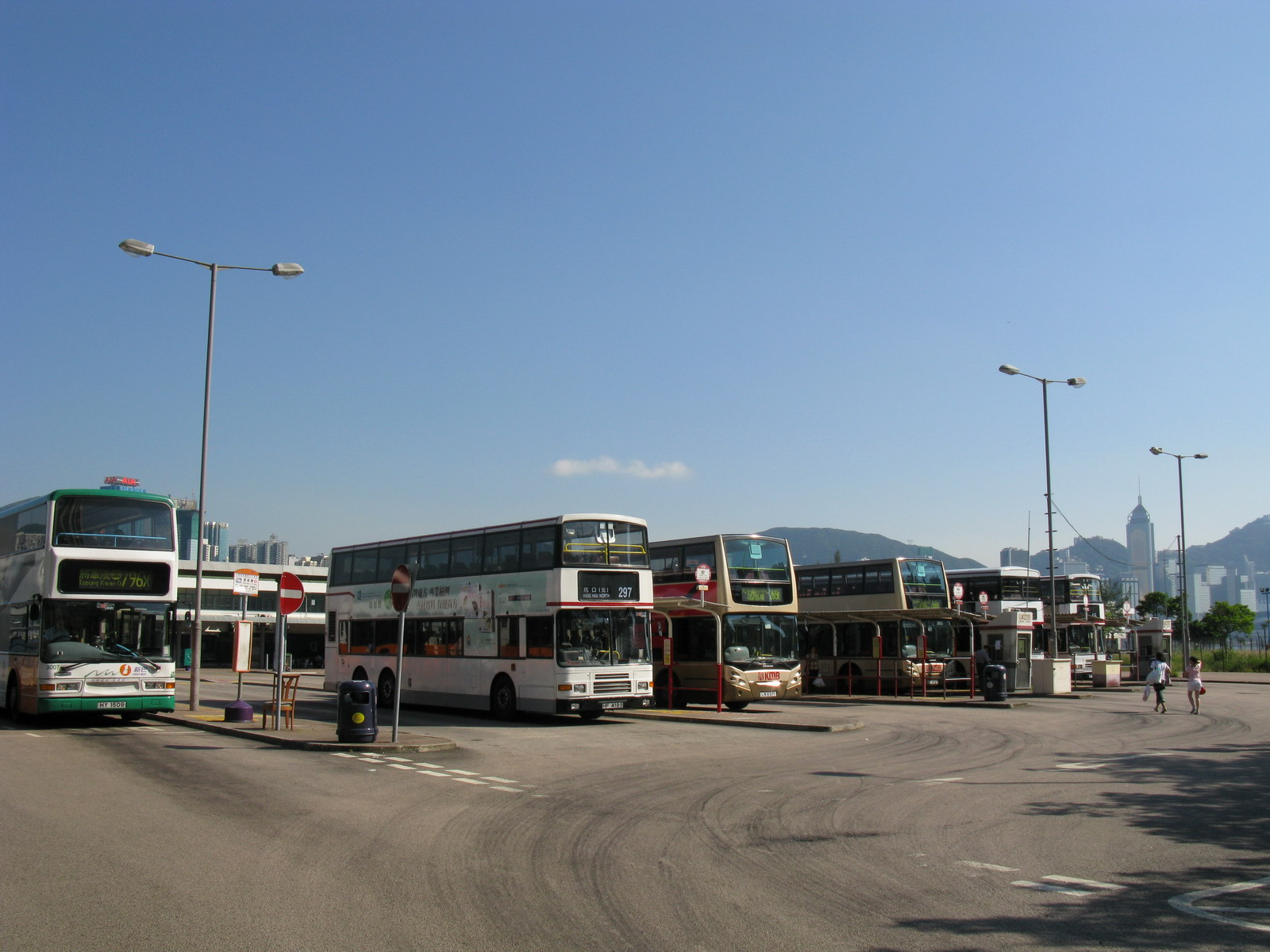
Hung Hom Ferry Pier Bus Terminus in July 2008

Hung Hom Ferry Pier (Chinese: 紅磡碼頭) is a ferry pier in Hung Hom, Kowloon, Hong Kong. It is located on the reclaimed land of Hung Hom Bay. Currently, two ferry companies operate routes to Central Piers and North Point Ferry Pier.

== History ==
The original pier, opened in 1979 using Streamline Moderne design from the Star Ferry terminals at Central and Tsim Sha Tsui, was located near the Hung Hom station, close to the current position of Metropolis Tower. In 1988, the pier was temporarily relocated to the seaside of Hunghom Bay Centre to cope with the Hung Hom Bay Reclamation Project. When the project was completed in 1991, the pier was moved to the current location. It opened in March 1991.

== Ferry routes ==
- East berth
  - Hung Hom - North Point (operated by Sun Ferry)
- West berth
  - Hung Hom - Central (operated by Fortune Ferry)

== Public Transport Interchange ==
The former Hung Hom Ferry Pier Public Transport Interchange (紅磡碼頭巴士總站), a large bus terminus outside the pier, was replaced by the Hung Hom (Hung Luen Road) Public Transport Interchange (紅磡（紅鸞道）公共運輸交匯處), located inside the nearby Kerry Hotel. MTR Whampoa station exit C2.
