= Hung Hom Bay =

Bay in Victoria Harbour, Hong Kong

Coordinates: 22°18′N 114°11′E

- Traditional Chinese: 紅磡灣
- Simplified Chinese: 红磡湾
Transcriptions
Standard Mandarin
- Hanyu Pinyin: Hóngkàn Wān
Yue: Cantonese
- Jyutping: hung4 ham3 waan1

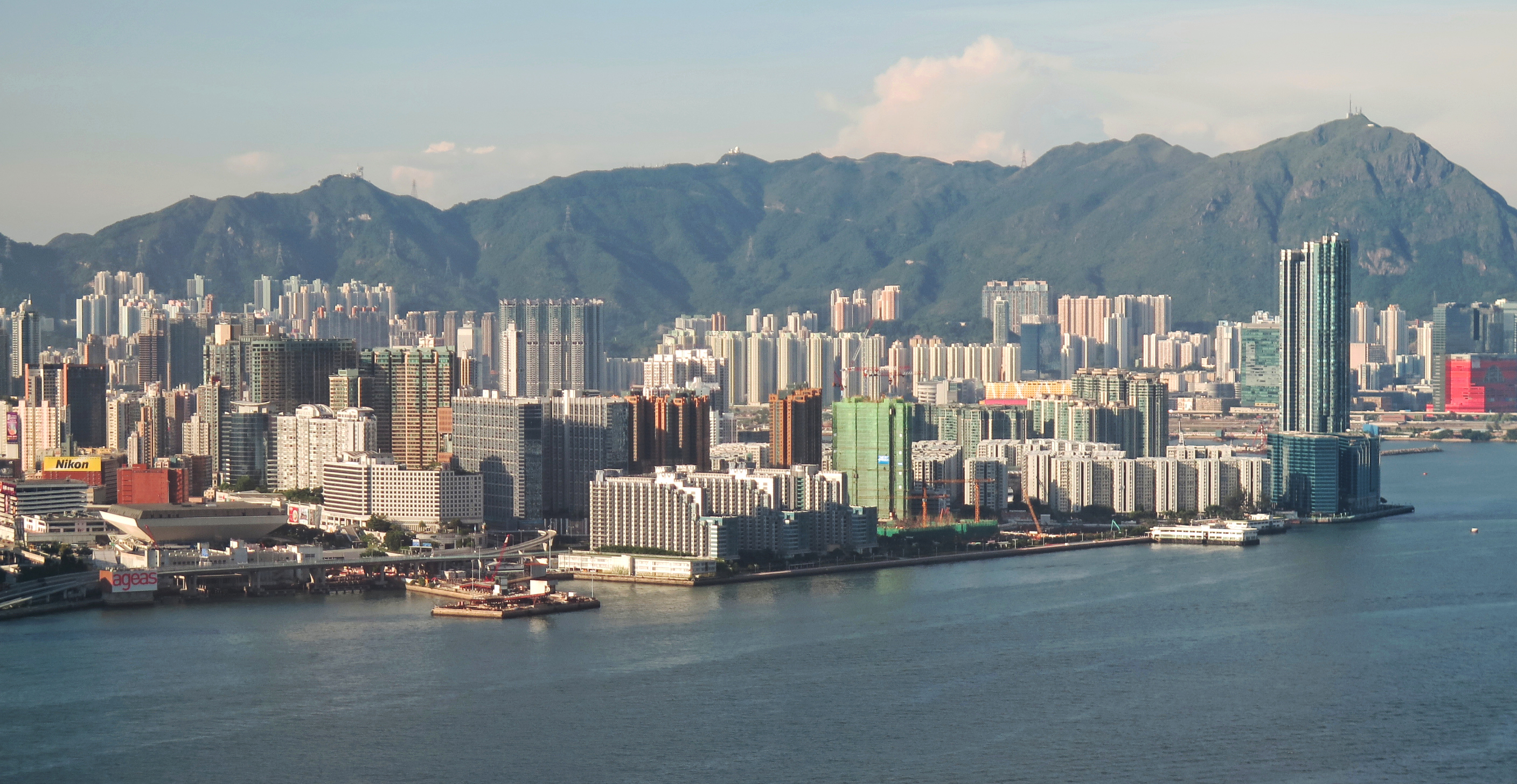
Hung Hom Bay Buildings in August 2014

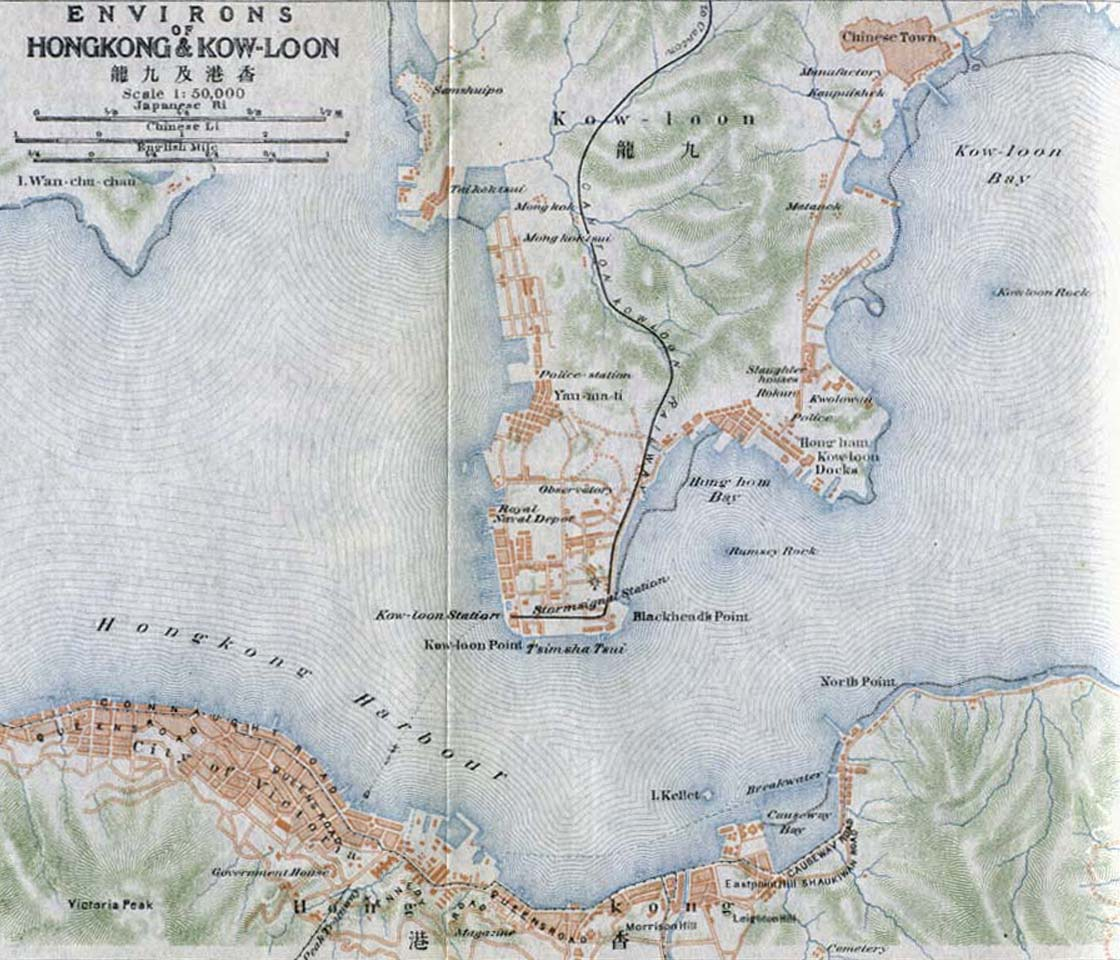
Hong Kong map in 1915, indicated the Hung Hom Bay in the southeast of Kowloon Peninsula

Hung Hom Bay was a bay in Victoria Harbour, between Tsim Sha Tsui and Hung Hom in the southeast of Kowloon Peninsula, Hong Kong.

Since 1994, parts of the bay were reclaimed, and by 2019 it had been completely extinguished. All of present-day Tsim Sha Tsui East and Hung Hom station on the MTR as well as the Hung Hom Ferry Pier are on land reclaimed from the bay. The reclamation also buried several rocks, including Rumsey Rock. The bay once came inland as far as the present-day interchange of the West Kowloon Corridor and the Hung Hom Bypass.

== Education ==
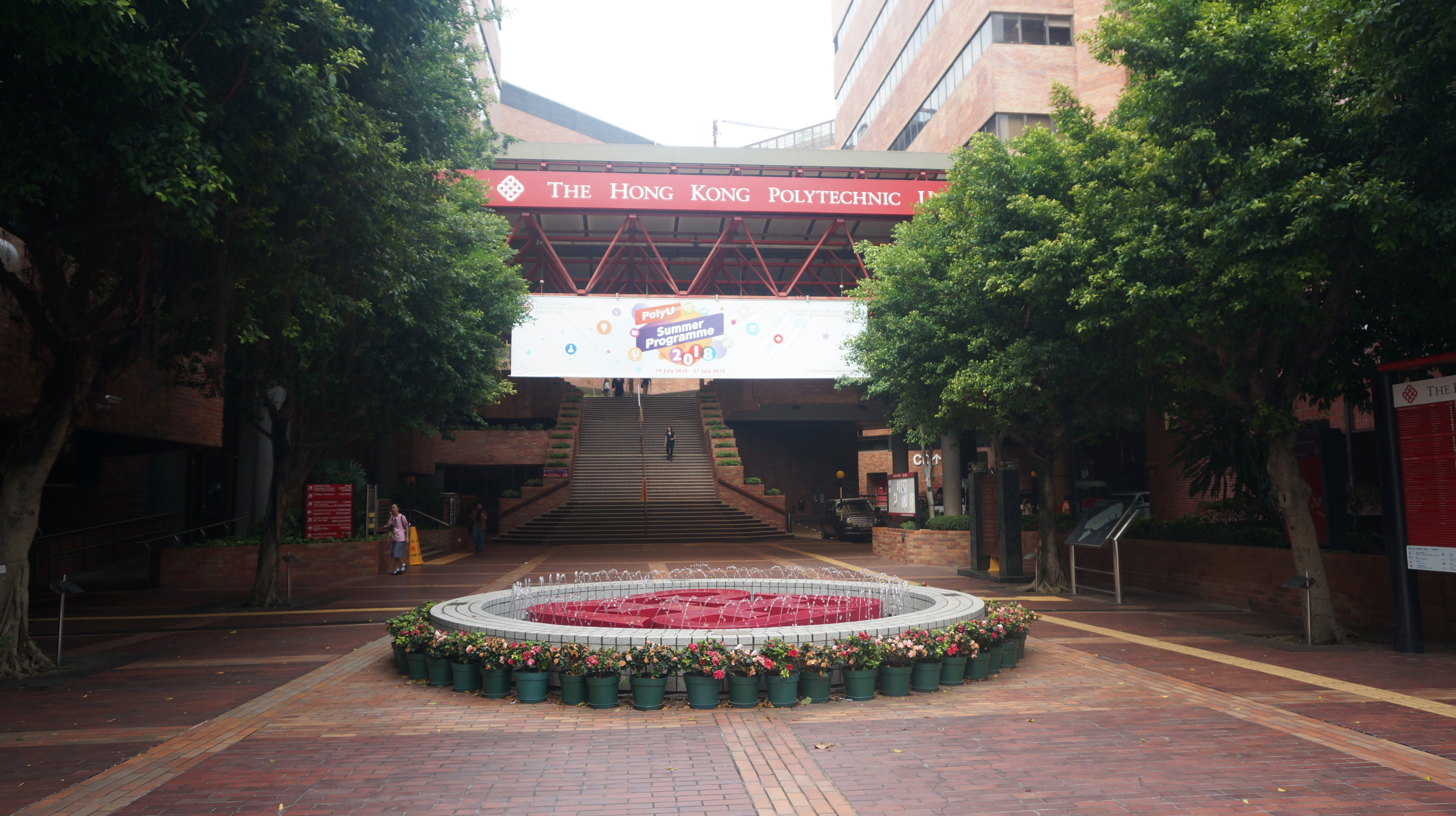
Cheong Wan Road entrance of the Hong Kong Polytechnic University in July 2018

- Hong Kong Community College (Hung Hom Bay campus)
- Hong Kong Polytechnic University
- Ma Tau Chung Government Primary School (Hung Hom Bay) (馬頭涌官立小學（紅磡灣）)

== Transportation ==
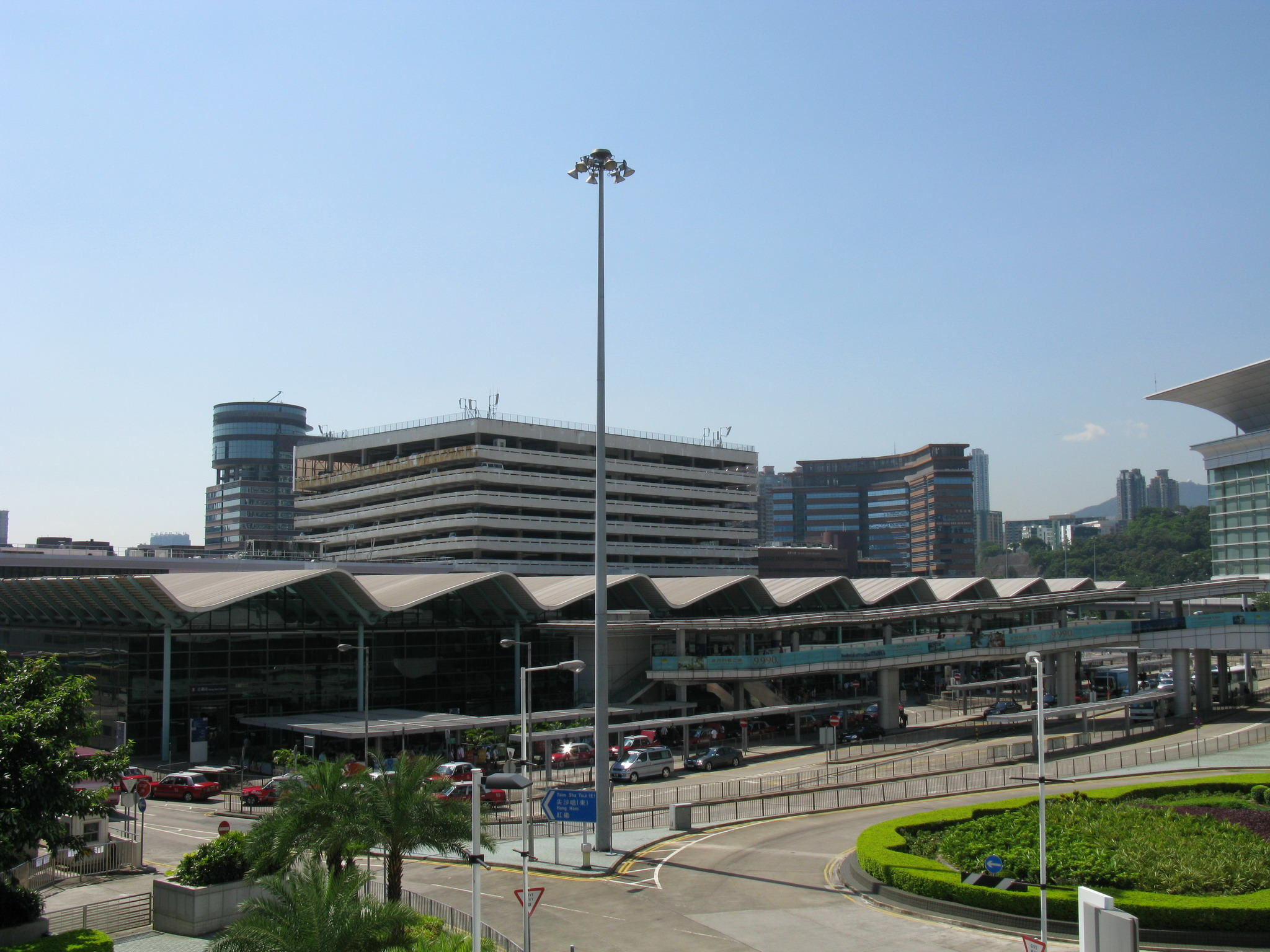
Hung Hom station in July 2008

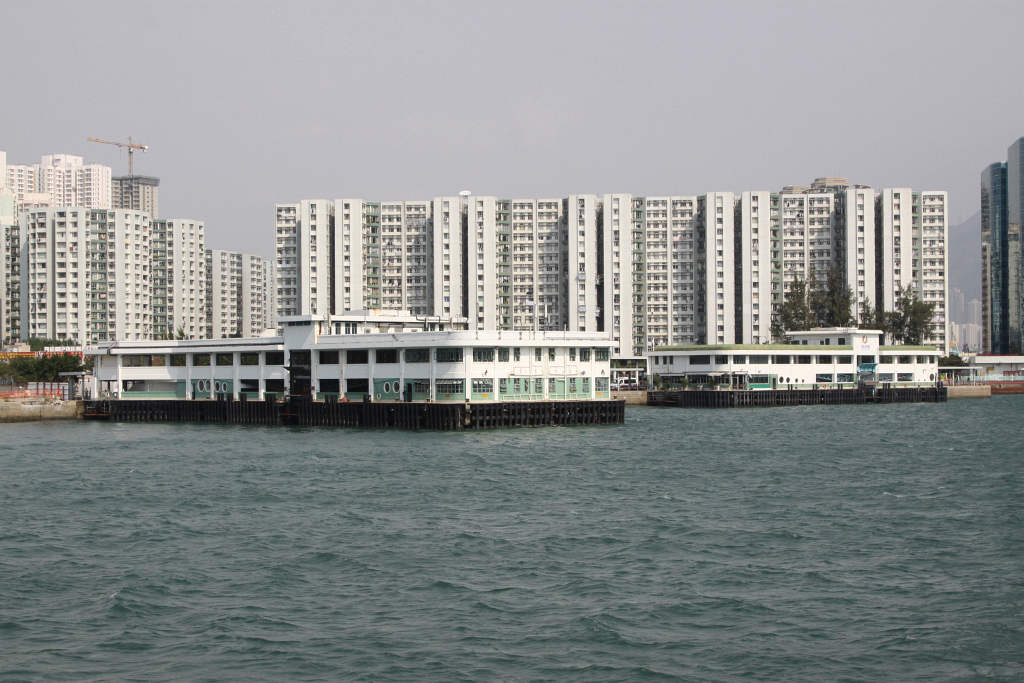
Hung Hom Ferry Pier in December 2010

- Hung Hom station
- Hung Hom Ferry Pier

== Facilities ==
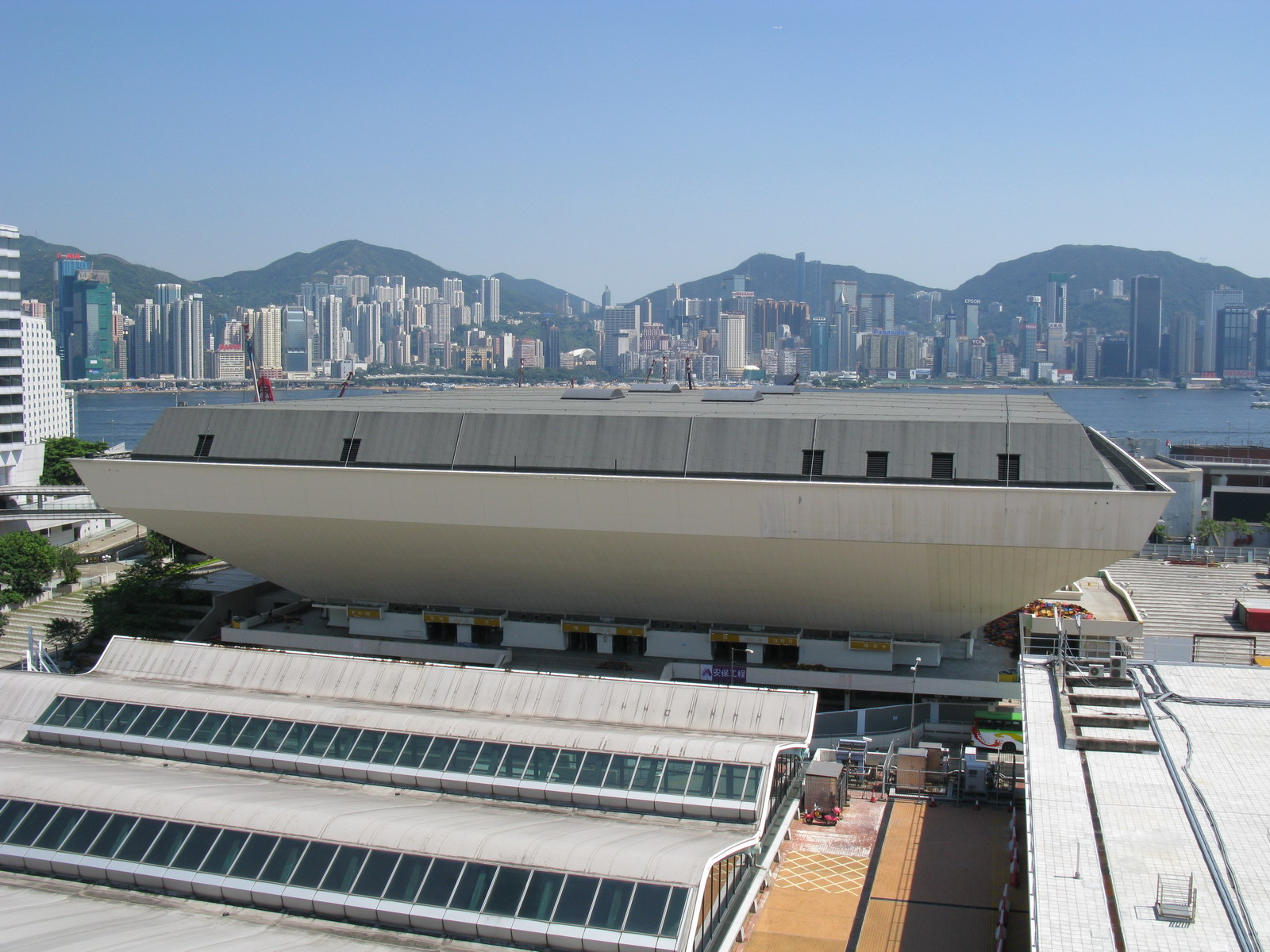
The Hong Kong Coliseum consists of a big arena and a number of conference rooms. Taken in July 2008.

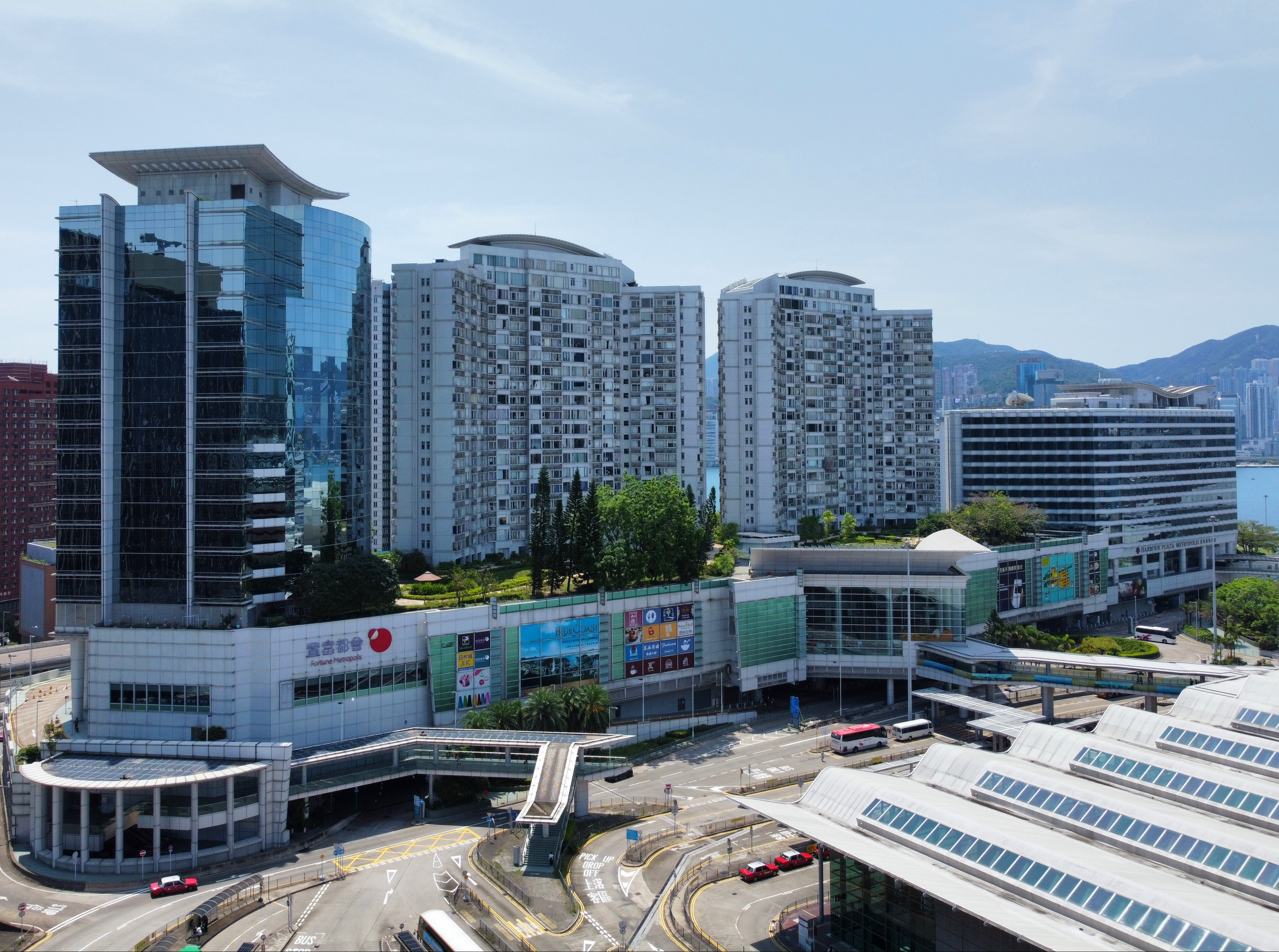
Fortune Metropolis

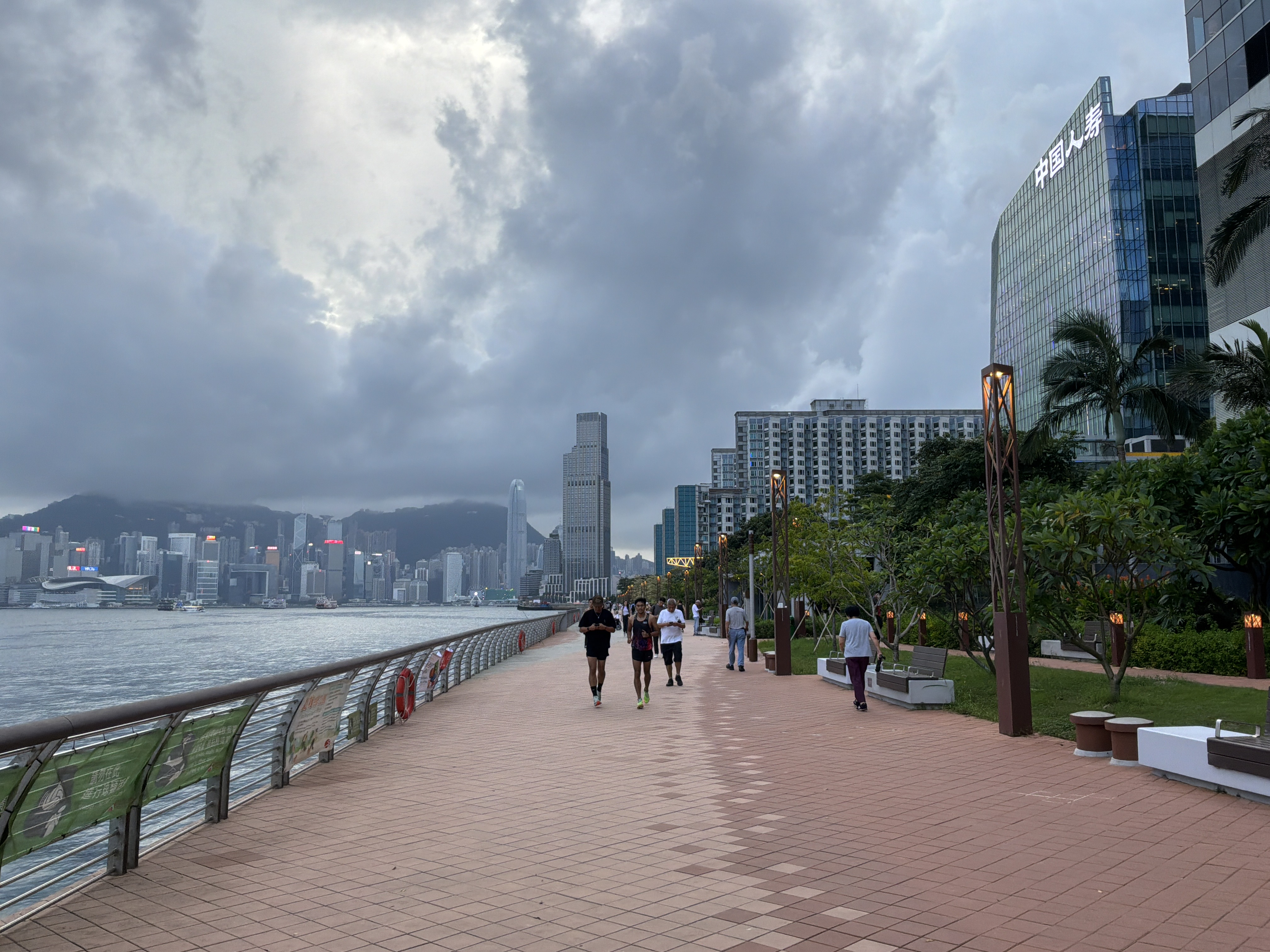
Hung Hom Promenade

== Hotel ==
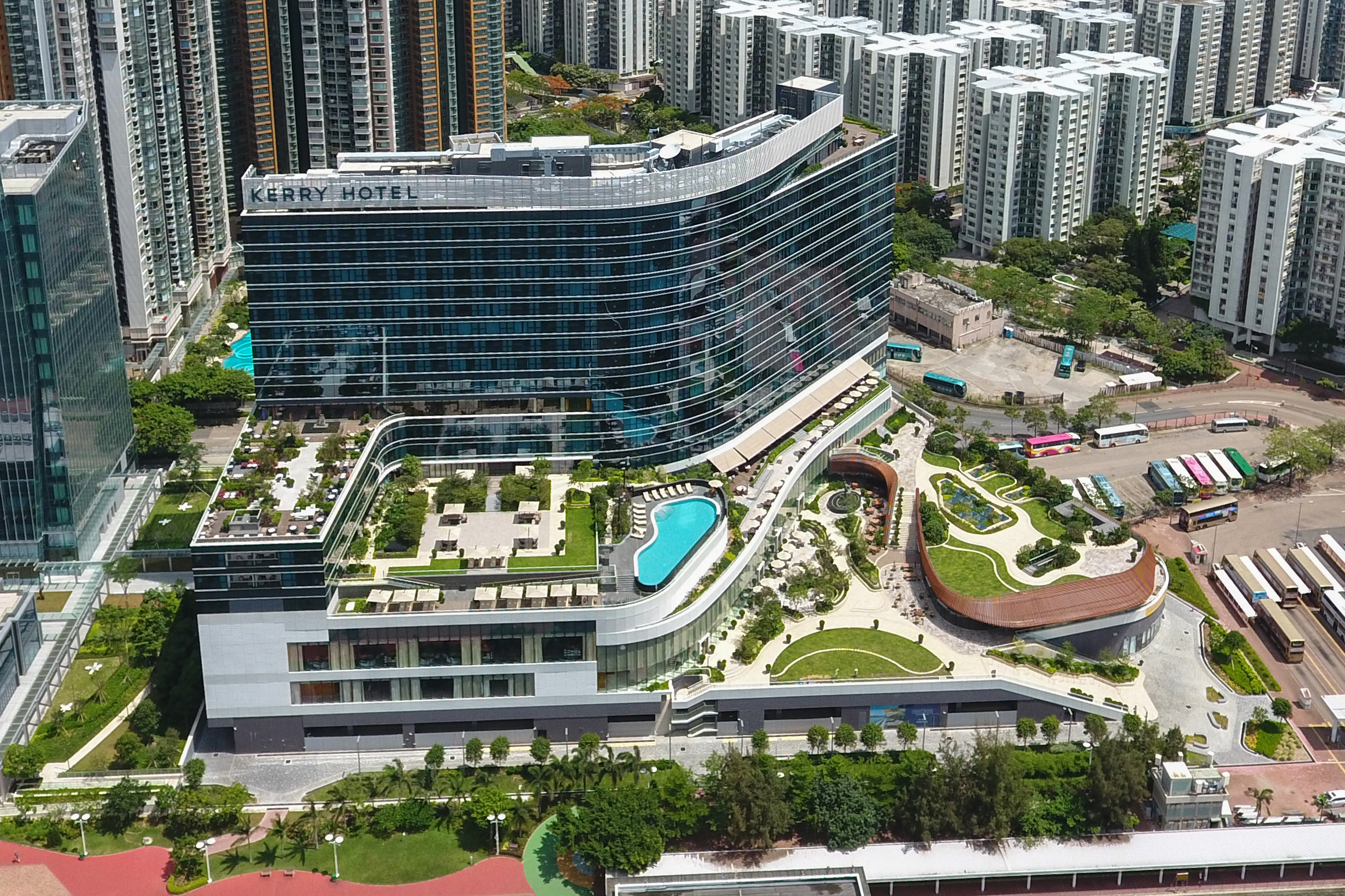
Kerry Hotel Hong Kong opened in 2017.

- Harbour Grand Kowloon
- Harbour Plaza Metropolis
- Kerry Hotel Hong Kong

== Residential ==
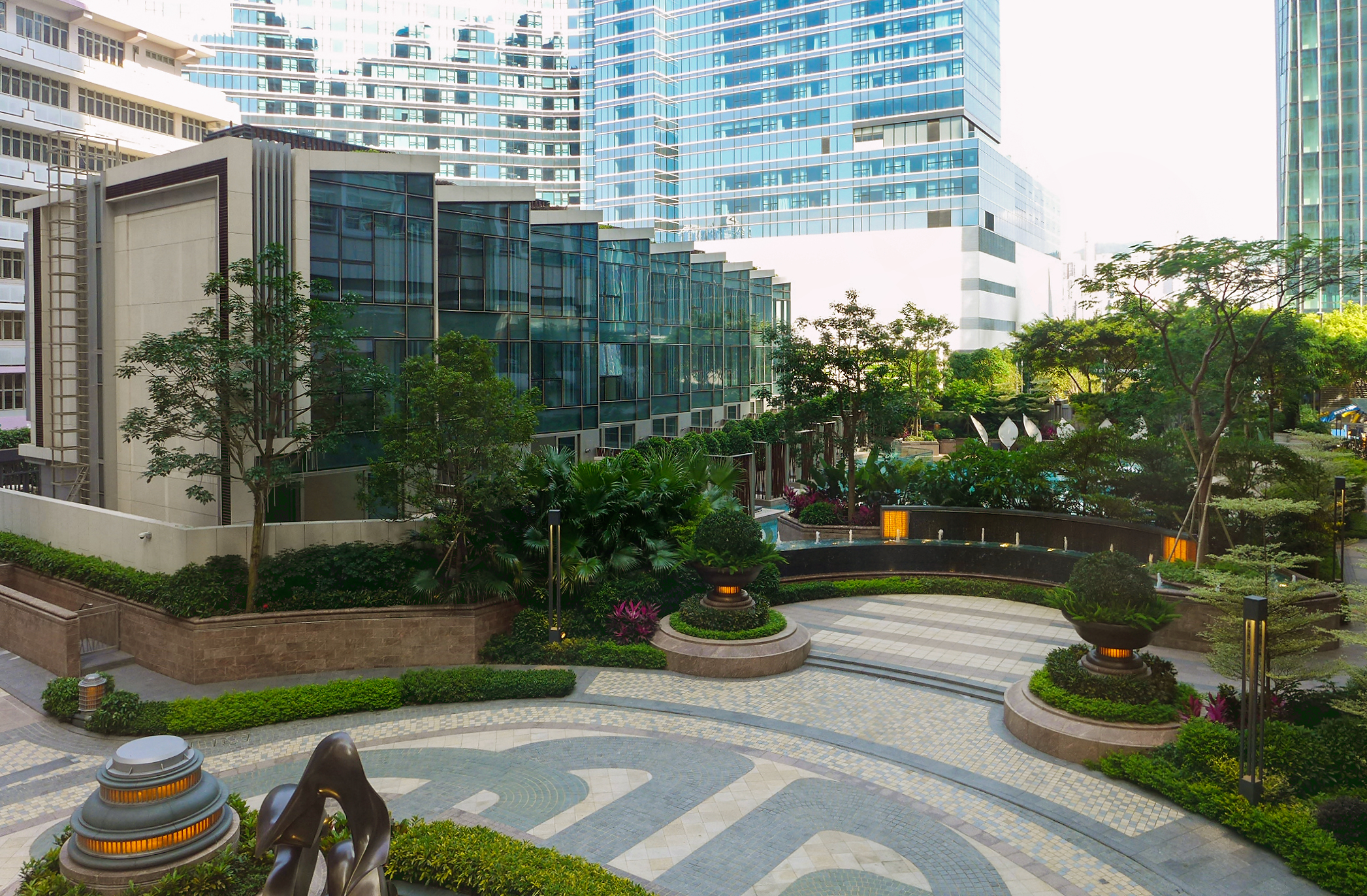
Stars by the Harbour in May 2017

- Harbour Place
- Harbourfront Horizon
- Harbourview Horizon
- The Harbourfront Landmark
- The Metropolis Residence
- Royal Peninsula
- Stars by the Harbour
