= Rumsey Rock =

Rock in Hung Hom Bay, Hong Kong

Coordinates: 22.29953°N 114.182547°E

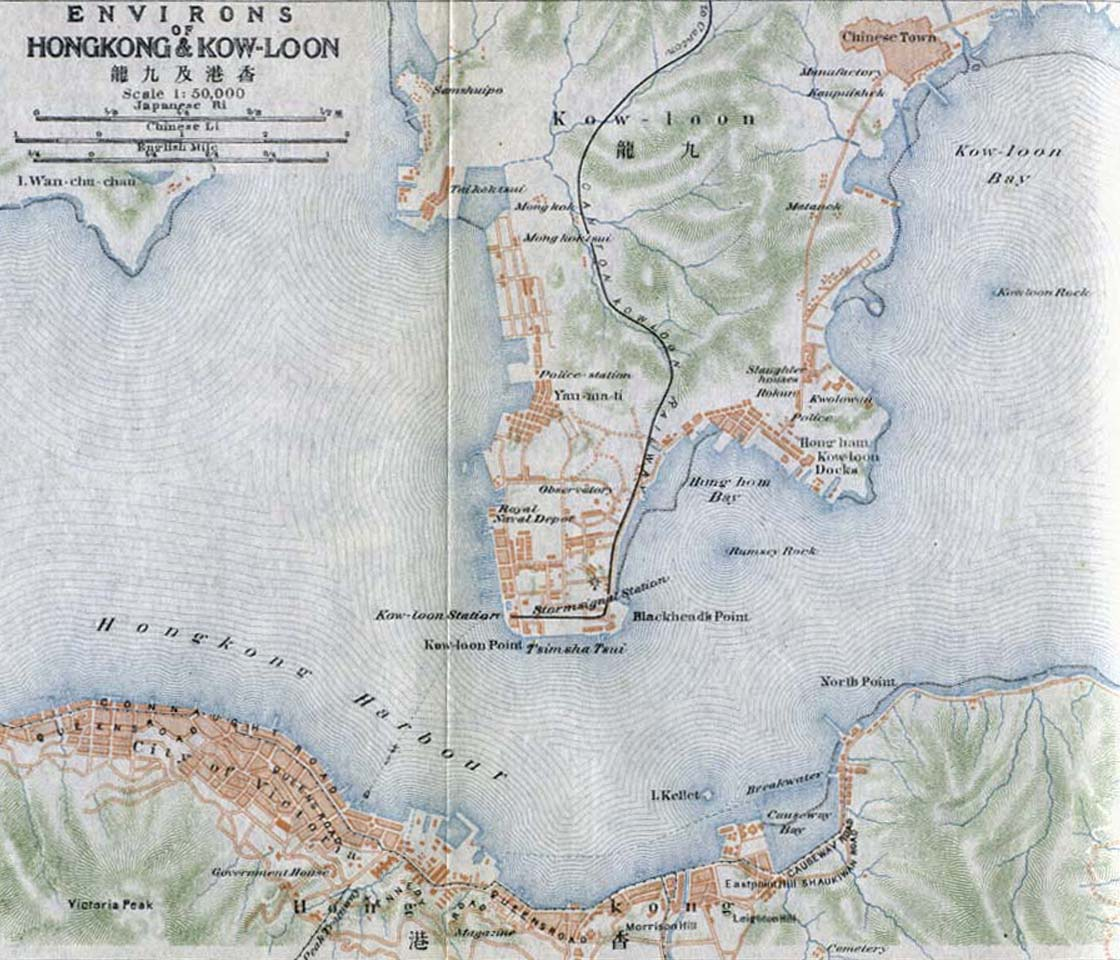
A 1915 map in which the rock is marked

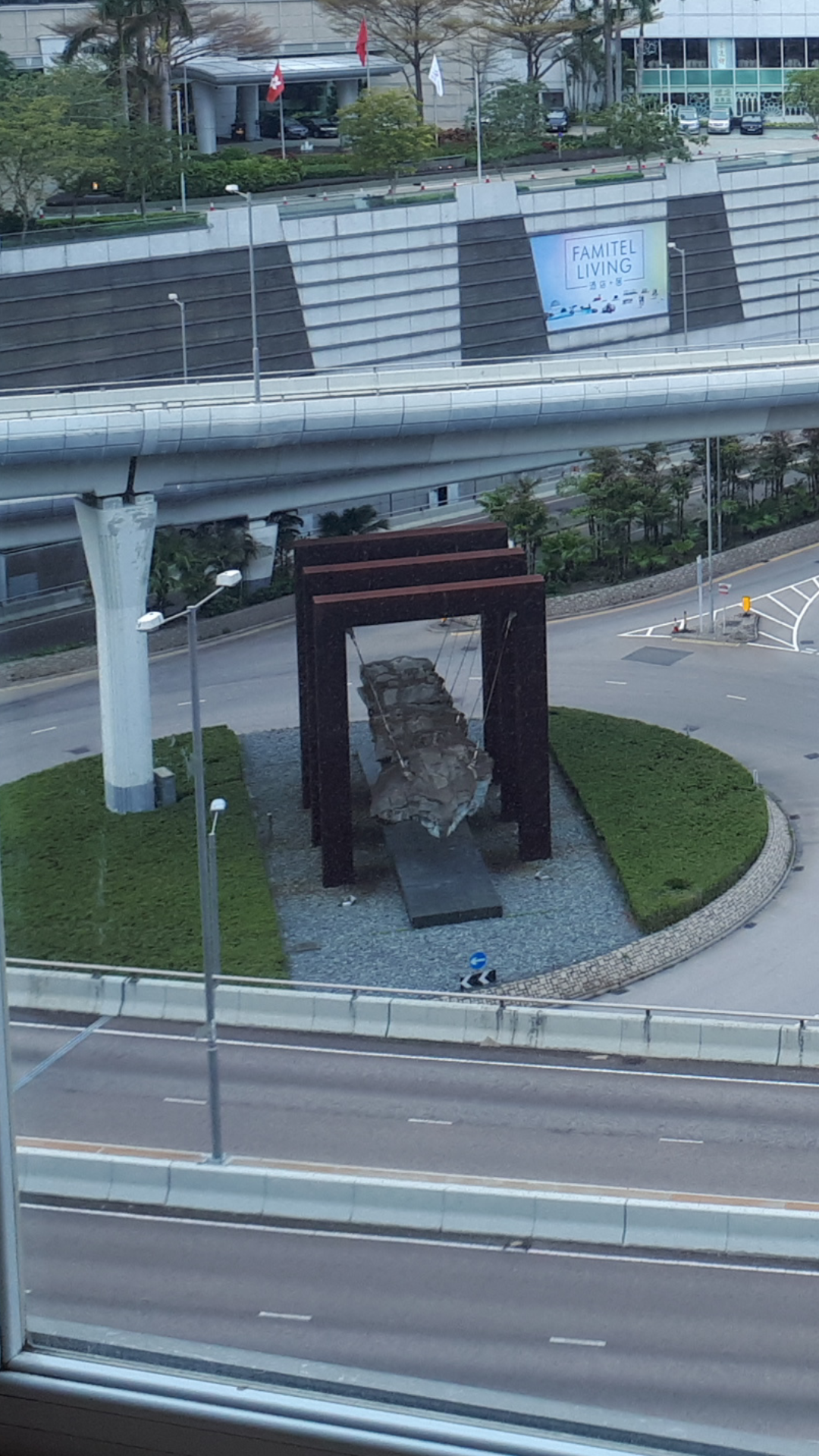
Rumsey Rock is now suspended in Hung Hom near the Harbourfront Hotel.

Rumsey Rock (Chinese: 林士石) was a rock in Hung Hom Bay, Victoria Harbour, Hong Kong. Administratively it belonged to the Kowloon City District.

The rock was incorporated in reclaimed land between Tsim Sha Tsui East and Hung Hom in Kowloon in the 1970s. The site of the rock is now part of the Harbour Place private housing estate.
