= Kerry Hotel Hong Kong =

Hotel in Hong Kong

- 香港嘉里酒店
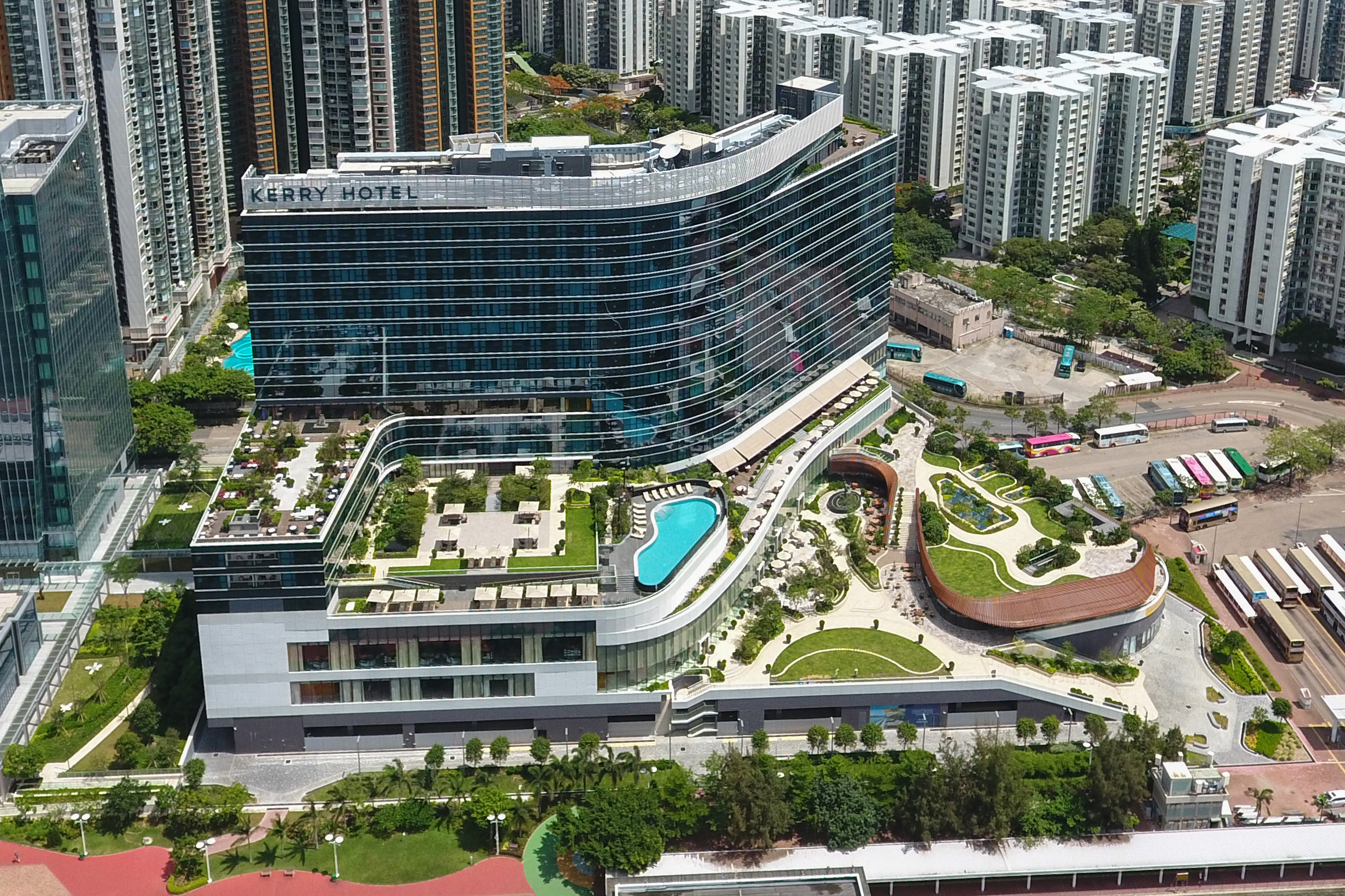
- Kerry Hotel Hong Kong in 2017

General information
- Type: Hotel
- Location: 38 Hung Luen Road, Hung Hom Bay, Hong Kong
- Coordinates: 22.301423°N 114.188851°E
- Opened: April 28, 2017
- Owner: Kerry Properties
- Operator: Shangri-La Hotels and Resorts

Technical details
- Floor count: 16

Other information
- Number of rooms: 546

Website
- website

Kerry Hotel Hong Kong
- Chinese: 香港嘉里酒店
Transcriptions
Standard Mandarin
- Hanyu Pinyin: Xiānggǎng Jiālǐ Jiǔdiàn
Yue: Cantonese
- Jyutping: hoeng1 gong2 gaa1 lei5 zau2 dim3

Kerry Hotel Hong Kong (Chinese: 香港嘉里酒店; Jyutping: hoeng1 gong2 gaa1 lei5 zau2 dim3) is a five-star hotel in Hong Kong. It is located in Hung Hom Bay, Kowloon peninsula. Opened in 2017, it is managed by Shangri-La Hotels and Resorts.

== History ==
On 28 April 2017, the Kerry Hotel Hong Kong opened.

== Design ==
Kerry Hotel Hong Kong was designed by Rocco Design Architects Associates Ltd, and André Fu was the interior designer.

== Gallery ==
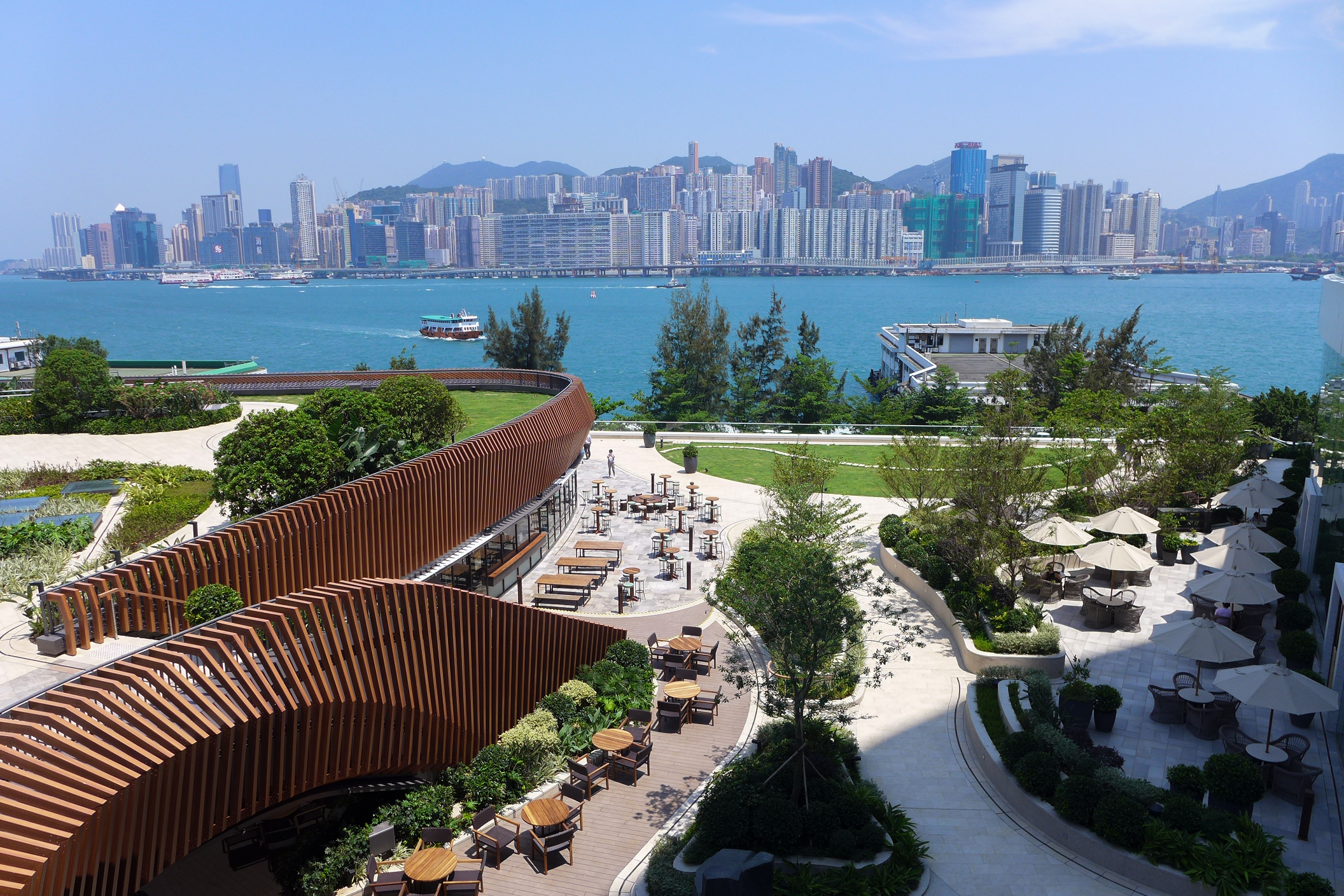
Kerry Hotel Hong Kong open space

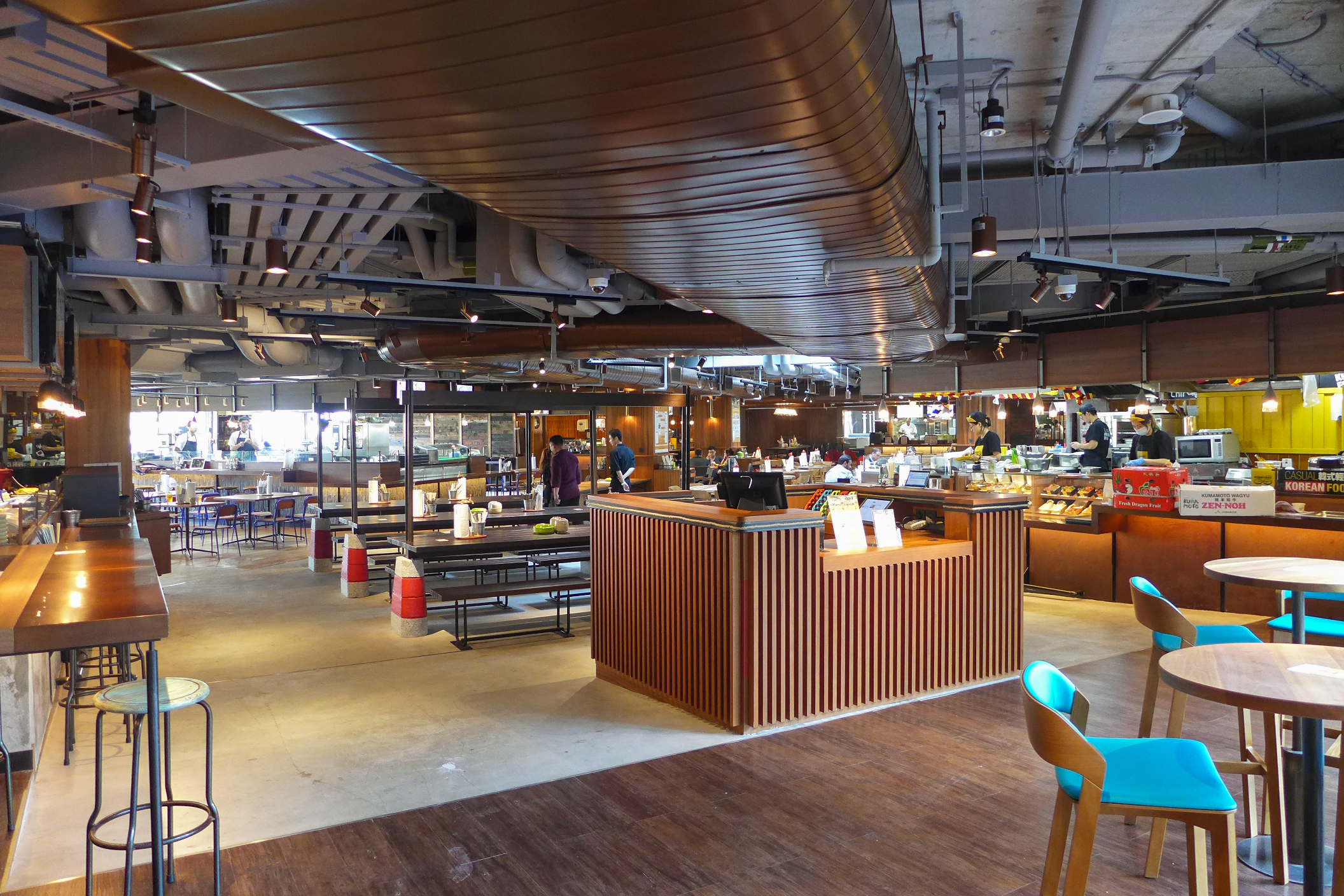
Dockyard food court

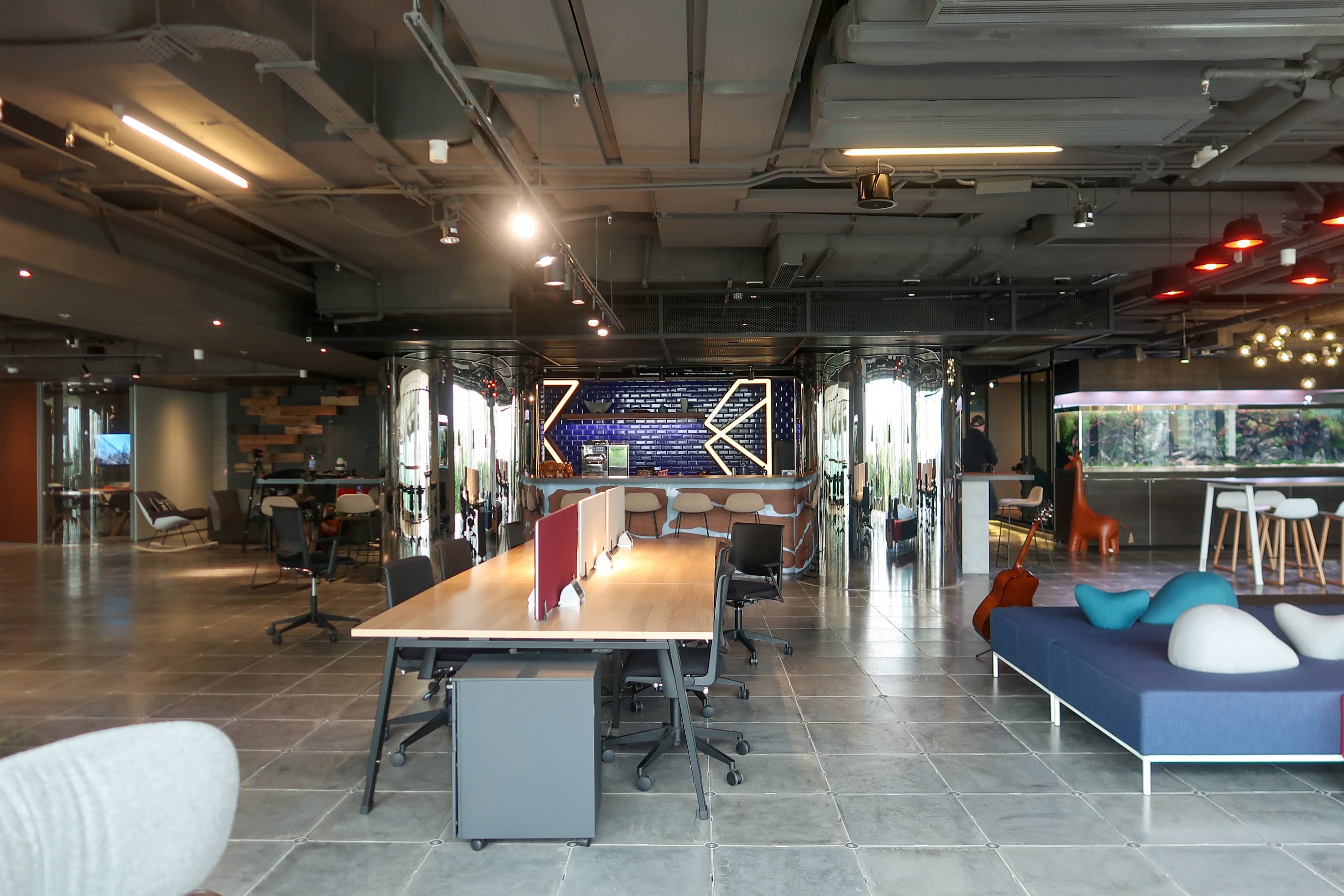
Kafnu Hong Kong

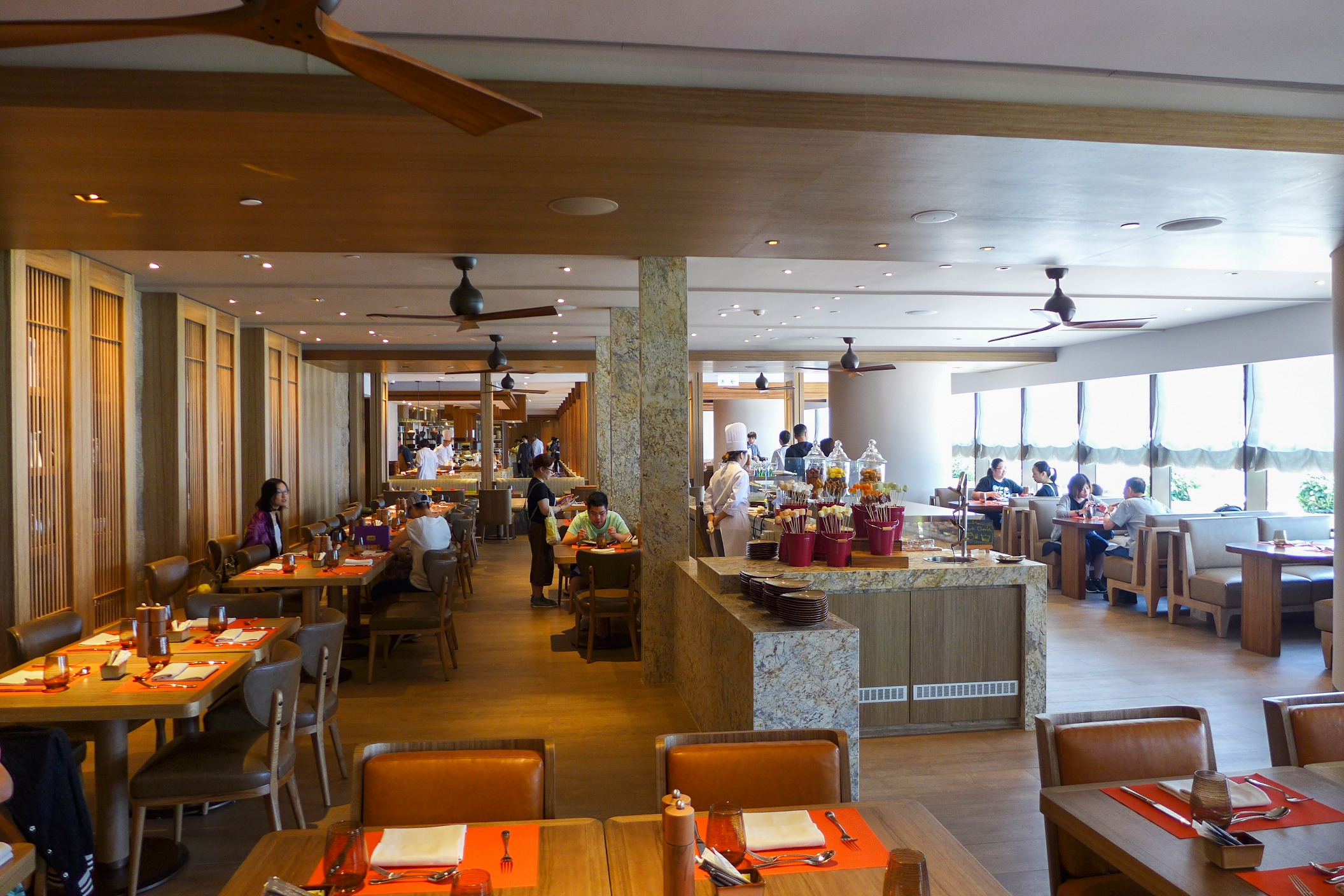
Big Bay Cafe

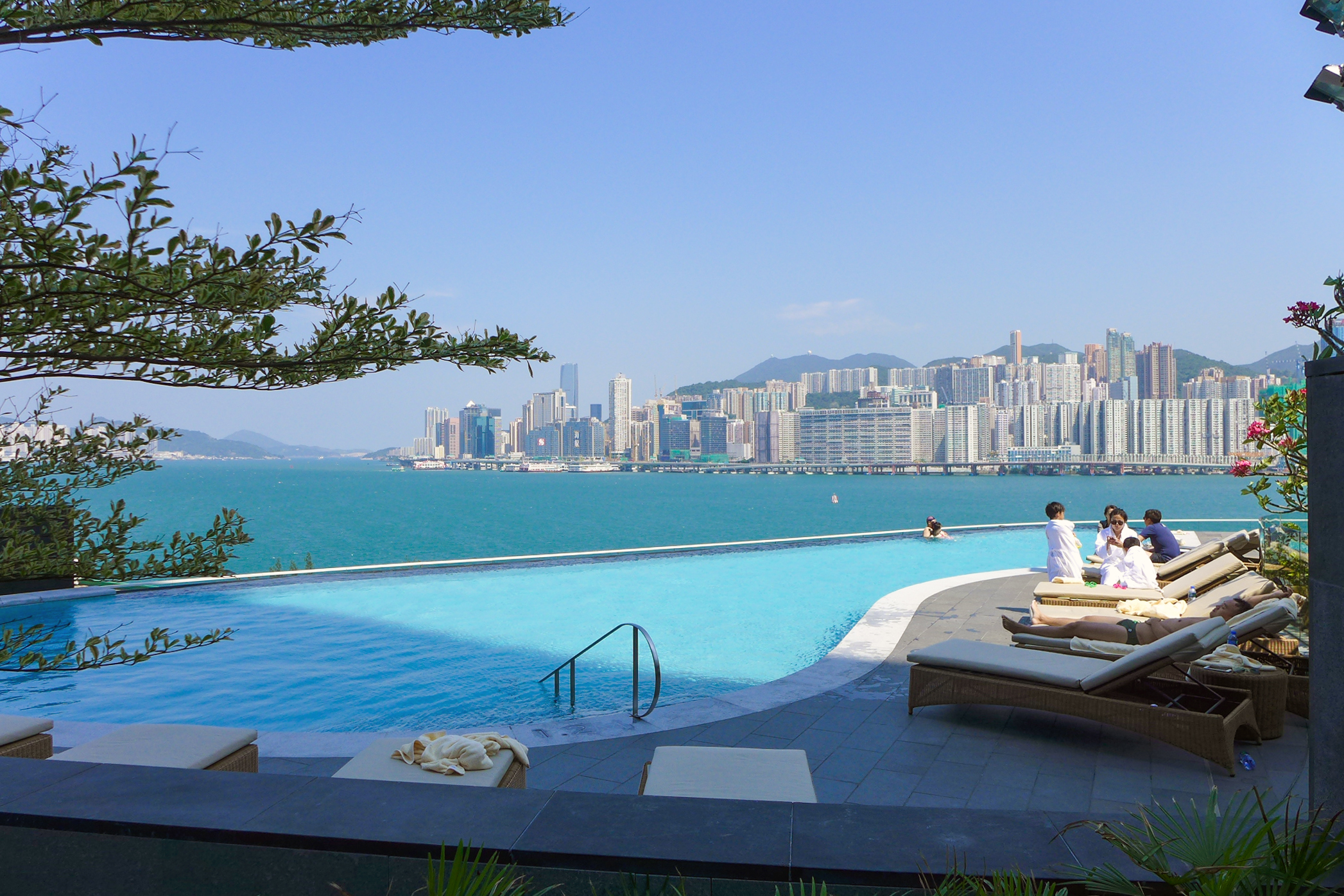
Infinity pool

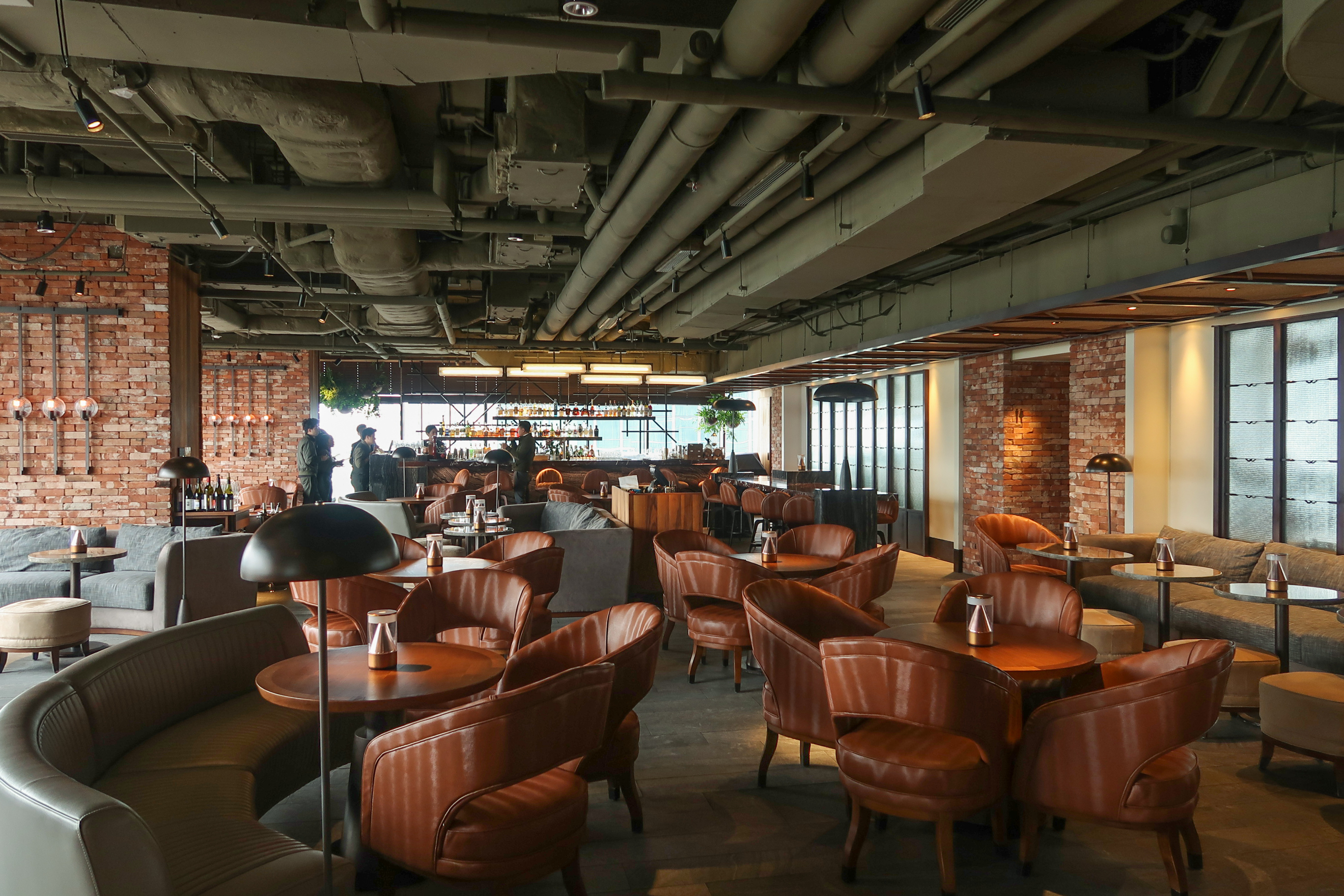
Red Sugar

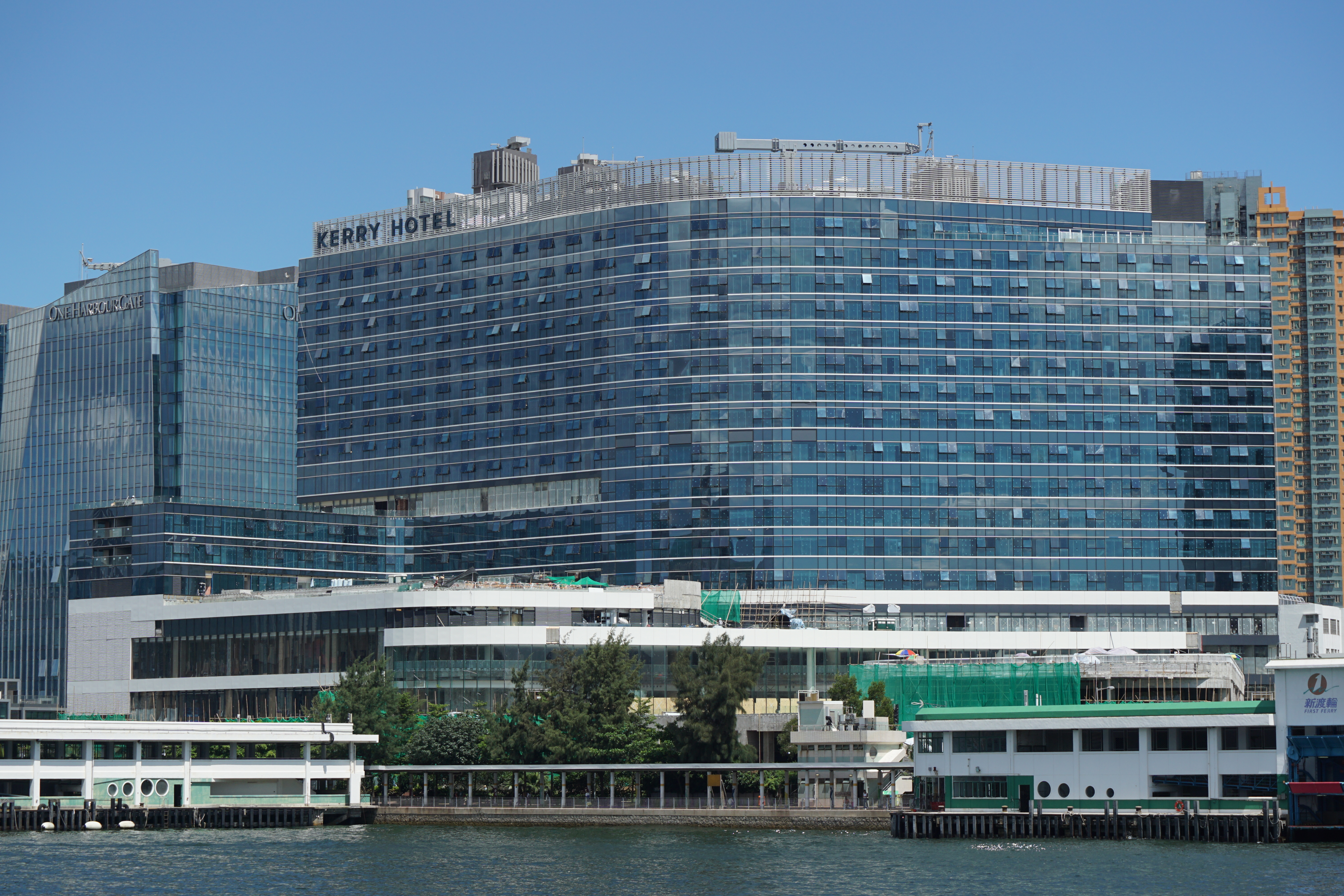
Under construction in 2016
