= MemeStrategy =

Company in Hong Kong

- Type: Public Company
- Traded as: SEHK: 2440
- Industry: IT
- Headquarters: Hong Kong, Lee Garden One, Causeway Bay
- Key people: Ray Chan（Chairman and CEO）
- Website: memestrategy.com.hk

MemeStrategy is a digital asset investment company in Asia. The company was founded by the team behind 9GAG.

== History ==
MemeStrategy was formerly known as Howkingtech International Holding. Howkingtech International Holding's main business was data transmission and processing service provider for Internet of Things (IoT), as well as a supplier of communication equipments.

In April 2025, 9GAG founder Ray Chan acquired a controlling stake in Howkingtech International Holding and renamed it Meme Strategy. Several senior executives from 9GAG joined the management team of MemeStrategy. The company's focus shifted towards artificial intelligence, blockchain, and cultural IPs. Casetify's CEO and co-founder, Wesley Ng, also joined as an independent non-executive director.

In June 2025, MemeStrategy became the first publicly listed company in Hong Kong to invest in the Solana ecosystem.

In August 2025, MemeStrategy signed a strategic cooperation agreement with Helio, a subsidiary of stablecoin platform MoonPay. Both parties jointly support the development of the token trading platform Moonit. Moonit will allow users to tokenize memes and transform cultural assets into on-chain assets.

In November 2025, MemeStrategy acquired the collectible trading card company Grade10.

== Hong Kong film industry ==
In April 2025, MemeStrategy, in collaboration with 9GAG, helped promote the 43rd Hong Kong Film Awards. This included inviting actors Chiu Sin-hang and Lam Yiu-sing to shoot a short movie titled "The Awards and Golden Rice." Filmmaker Tin Kai-man also shared his film making experience at a private screening event hosted at the Ko Shan Theatre.
