= 1CAK =

Indonesian entertainment website

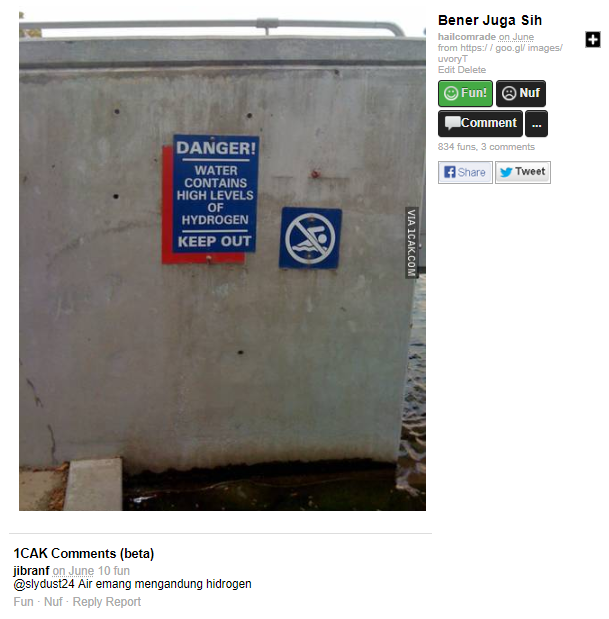
- A post in 1CAK
- Company type: Private
- Website type: Entertainment
- Available in: Indonesian
- Founded: February 17, 2012; 14 years ago
- Headquarters: Bandung, Indonesia
- Country of origin: Indonesia
- Area served: Worldwide
- Founder: Aji Ramadhan
- Website: 1cak.com
- Advertising: Google AdSense
- Registration: Optional (required to submit, comment, or vote)
- Current status: Active

1CAK is an Indonesian entertainment site that provides images and videos uploaded by users, including Internet memes. 1CAK users can select and comment on images. Popular images appear on the main website.

== History ==
1CAK was founded by Aji Ramadhan. Originally Aji created his website on 1cuk.com on 17 February 2012 but later changed the domain to 1cak.com on 30 September. He avoided the negative connotation of word cuk in Javanese.

The website had 25,000 registered users as of October 2012. As of November, 1CAK had 40,000 daily visitors and 160,000 daily page views.

In February 2014, 1CAK had 9 million page views monthly from 560,000 visitors.

== Similarity to 9GAG ==
According to Tech in Asia, the interface of 1CAK is similar to 9GAG. The jokes created in the website were also similar with 9GAG with localized contexts. The founder admitted that 1CAK is influenced by 9GAG but claimed that both was not exactly the same. According to Kompas, Ray Chan, when asked about 1CAK that clones his website, said he was "happy if 9Gag is able to inspire people and spread the fun." (Note: Original: "senang jika 9Gag bisa menginspirasi orang-orang untuk turut menyebarkan kebahagiaan.")
