= Capture Bizarre =

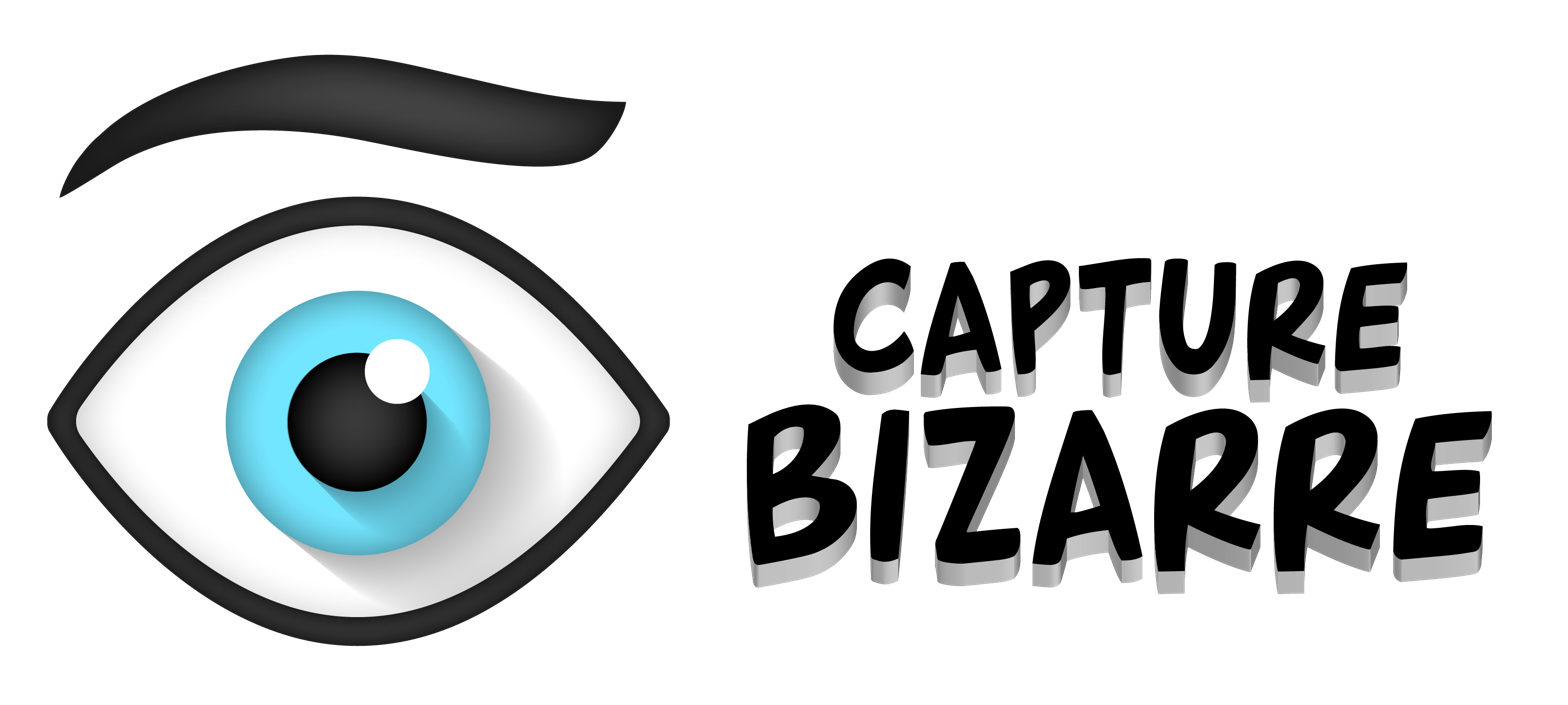
- Native name: Capture Bizarre
- Founded: 2014
- Headquarters: Villa Regina, Río Negro, Patagonia Argentina.
- Founder: Mauricio Vesprini
- Website: https://capturebizarre.com/

Capture Bizarre is a humorous website established and published in Argentina. Launched in 2014, it was influenced by 9gag, a website that was popular in Argentina before the emergence of platforms like Capture Bizarre. It has a community of over six million people in Argentina. Its founder and current director is Mauricio Vesprini, who holds a degree in Marketing.

== Biographical review ==
The website allows its users to create memes using the "meme generator." It is similar to 9gag's post generator, which also became popular worldwide. Posts on 9gag are called "gags" (meaning joke in English), while on Capture Bizarre they are referred to as memes (Rage comic).

With some modifications, the website's layout is similar to that of a traditional blog. The site's name comes from its original purpose of sharing screenshots that featured user mistakes on social media or humorous details. These compositions usually include an image accompanied by text boxes that serve as small comments or additional descriptions. Like 9gag, it stood out as one of the brands that brought humor to Argentina in the 1990s. Before the emergence of Capture Bizarre, most of the graphic humor circulating among Argentine users came from websites based outside the country.

The content and themes of these pieces typically feature internet memes, characters and personalities, designs that depict everyday activities with humorous touches, jokes about certain stereotypes related to men, women, and politicians, criticism of certain artists and actors, parodies, satires, short stories, or comments. Any registered user can create these pieces.

In 2018, Mauricio Vesprini, together with Julián Morales, introduced the online meme generator through Capture Bizarre. Once uploaded to the server, these images can be sent to other users on the site or downloaded to share on other social media platforms. Later, Capture Bizarre changed its approach to user content. They decided to receive users' creations and review them before publishing.

One of the most viral images was the Bernie Sanders meme in 2021. It became a source of revenue for a charitable cause. The Democratic senator raised nearly two million dollars, which was donated to charities in his home state of Vermont.

During the mandatory preventive social isolation implemented in Argentina in 2020, the number of users accessing the platform increased. As a result, the National University of Río Negro began including academic content for marketing students focused on analyzing the growth of Capture Bizarre. Members of Capture Bizarre gave lectures, and university students had the opportunity to present their analyses.

In 2024, it received a nomination in the "memes" and "community and memes" categories at the Ídolo Argentina and Martín Fierro Digital Awards.

In 2025, one of the videos it posted reached the top 10 most viewed videos in the world in Instagram's history, with over 266 million views.

== Extnal links ==
- official website
