= Ho Man Tin station =

MTR station in Kowloon, Hong Kong

Ho Man Tin 何文田
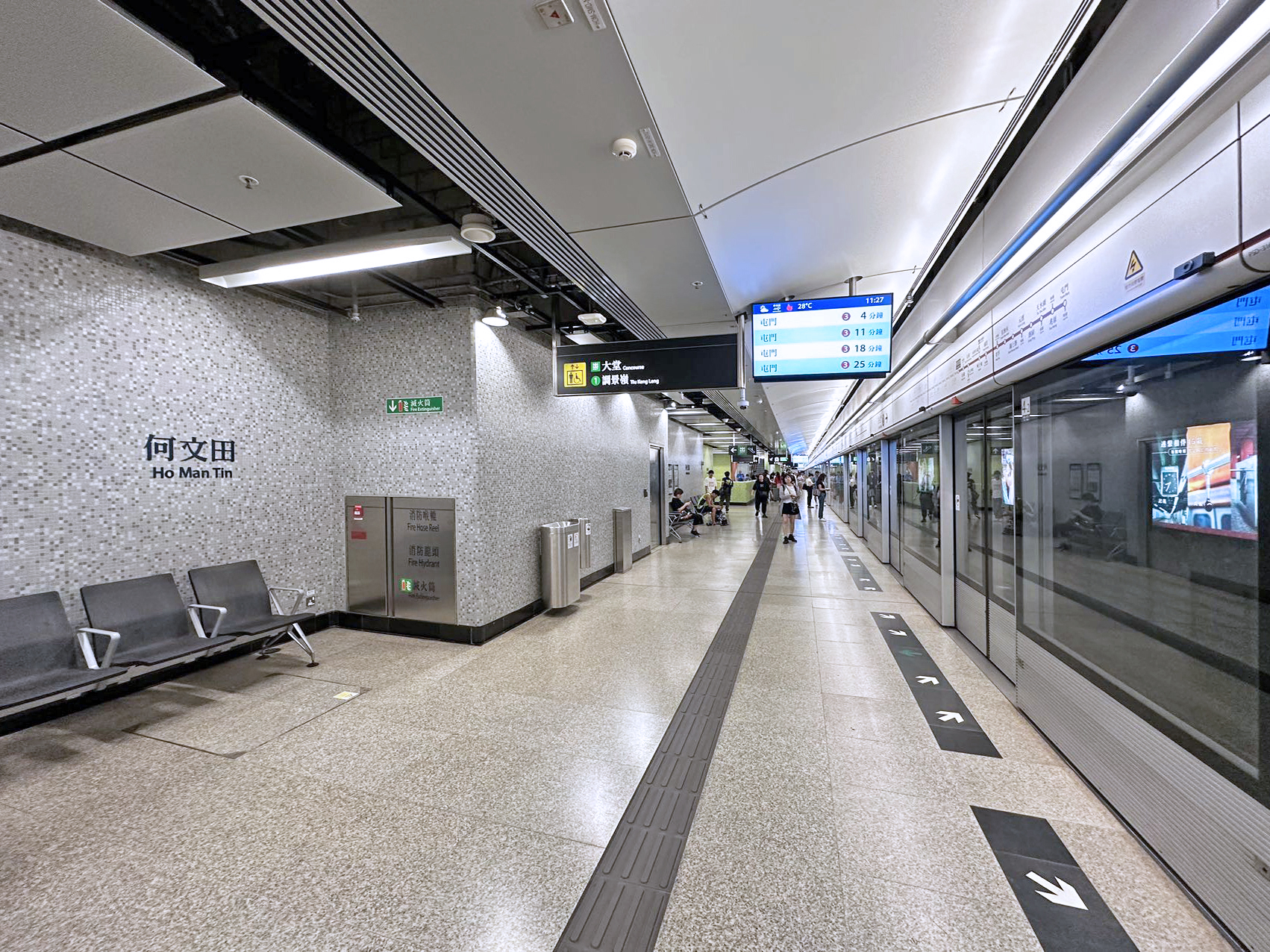
- Platforms 3 of Ho Man Tin station in October 2024

General information
- Location: Intersection between Chung Hau Street, Chatham Road North and Wuhu Street, Lo Lung Hang; Kowloon City District, Hong Kong
- Coordinates: 22°18′33″N 114°10′58″E
- System: MTR rapid transit station
- Owner: MTR Corporation
- Operator: MTR Corporation
- Lines: Kwun Tong line; Tuen Ma line
- Platforms: 4; Tuen Ma line : 1 island platform; Kwun Tong line : 2 side platforms
- Tracks: 4

Construction
- Structure type: Underground
- Platform levels: 2
- Accessible: Yes

Other information
- Station code: HOM

History
- Opened: Kwun Tong line : 23 October 2016; 10 years ago; Tuen Ma line : 27 June 2021; 5 years ago

Services
Preceding station	MTR	Following station
Whampoa Terminus	Kwun Tong line	Yau Ma Tei towards Tiu Keng Leng
Hung Hom towards Tuen Mun	Tuen Ma line	To Kwa Wan towards Wu Kai Sha
Route map
Location
- Location within MTR Location within Hong Kong urban core

Ho Man Tin station
- Chinese: 何文田
- Jyutping: Ho4 man4 tin4
- Literal meaning: Ho Man's Land
Transcriptions
Standard Mandarin
- Hanyu Pinyin: Héwéntián
Yue: Cantonese
- Yale Romanization: Hòmàntìn
- Jyutping: Ho4 man4 tin4
- IPA: [hɔ˩mɐn˩tʰin˩]

Ho Man Tin (Chinese: 何文田; Cantonese Yale: Hòmàntìn) is an underground MTR rapid transit station on the Kwun Tong line and the Tuen Ma line. It is located beneath Valley Road in Lo Lung Hang, and was constructed as part of the Sha Tin to Central Link project.

Despite its name, the station is technically not located within Ho Man Tin and is more than 1 km (0.62 mi) away from the central part of Ho Man Tin between Argyle Street and Waterloo Road. The station is nearer to the central part of Hung Hom while Hung Hom station is located at reclaimed area of Hung Hom Bay.

== History ==
Ho Man Tin station was constructed under the HK$2.97 billion Kwun Tong Line Extension Contract 1001, which was awarded in 2011 to Nishimatsu Construction. This contract covered the station, the railway tunnels between Yau Ma Tei and Whampoa Station, and a ventilation building halfway between Yau Ma Tei and Ho Man Tin.

The new 58,000 m^{2} (620,000 sq ft), eight-level railway station, cruciform in plan, was built on the site of the Valley Road Estate, which had been demolished a decade earlier. Built into a hillside, the station is partly underground and partly above-ground. The underground levels were excavated through the drill-and-blast method.

The Kwun Tong line platforms of Ho Man Tin station opened on 23 October 2016. The Tuen Ma line platforms opened on 27 June 2021.

== Station layout ==
The station is located between Chung Hau Street and Chatham Road North. While the Tuen Ma line platforms were boarded up, they were used as a passageway between the concourse and the Kwun Tong line platforms.

During peak periods, some westbound Kwun Tong line trains terminate at platform 2 and commence at platform 1 past the scissors crossover to a reversing siding. The remaining trains continue to Whampoa, the next station eastbound as well as the line's western terminus. This arrangement exists due to the limited capacity of the single terminating track at Whampoa, which cannot turnaround all Kwun Tong line trains during peak periods.

U3	Footbridge	Exit A3 (Upper Exit)
U2	Chung Hau Street	Exit A3 (Lower Exit), Exit B2
U2	Fat Kwong Street	Exit A2
G	Yan Fung Street	Exit A1, A4, Subway to Exit A2&A3, Shops
L1	Chatham Road North	Exit B1, Lifts to Exit B2
L2; Concourse	Concourse	Customer service, Shops, Exit C
L3	Passageway between concourse and platforms
L4; Platforms	Platform 4	Tuen Ma line towards Wu Kai Sha (To Kwa Wan)
L4; Platforms	Island platform, doors will open on the right
L4; Platforms	Platform 3	Tuen Ma line towards Tuen Mun (Hung Hom)
L6; Transfer Lobby	Transfer passageway between Tuen Ma line and Kwun Tong line
L7; Platforms	Side platform, doors will open on the right
L7; Platforms	Platform 1	Kwun Tong line towards Tiu Keng Leng (Yau Ma Tei)
L7; Platforms	Platform 2	Kwun Tong line towards Whampoa (Terminus)
L7; Platforms	Side platform, doors will open on the right

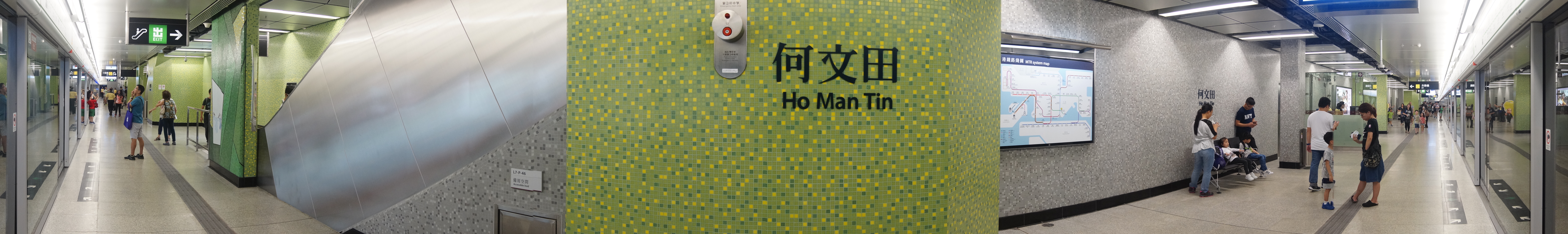
Panorama of a Kwun Tong line platform in October 2016

== Exits ==
- A1: Yan Fung Street
- A2: Fat Kwong Street
- A3: Ho Man Tin Estate, Oi Man Estate, Hong Kong Metropolitan University
- A4: ONMANTIN
- B1: Chatham Road North (Hung Hom)
- B2: Transport Interchange, Oi Man Estate
- C: In one
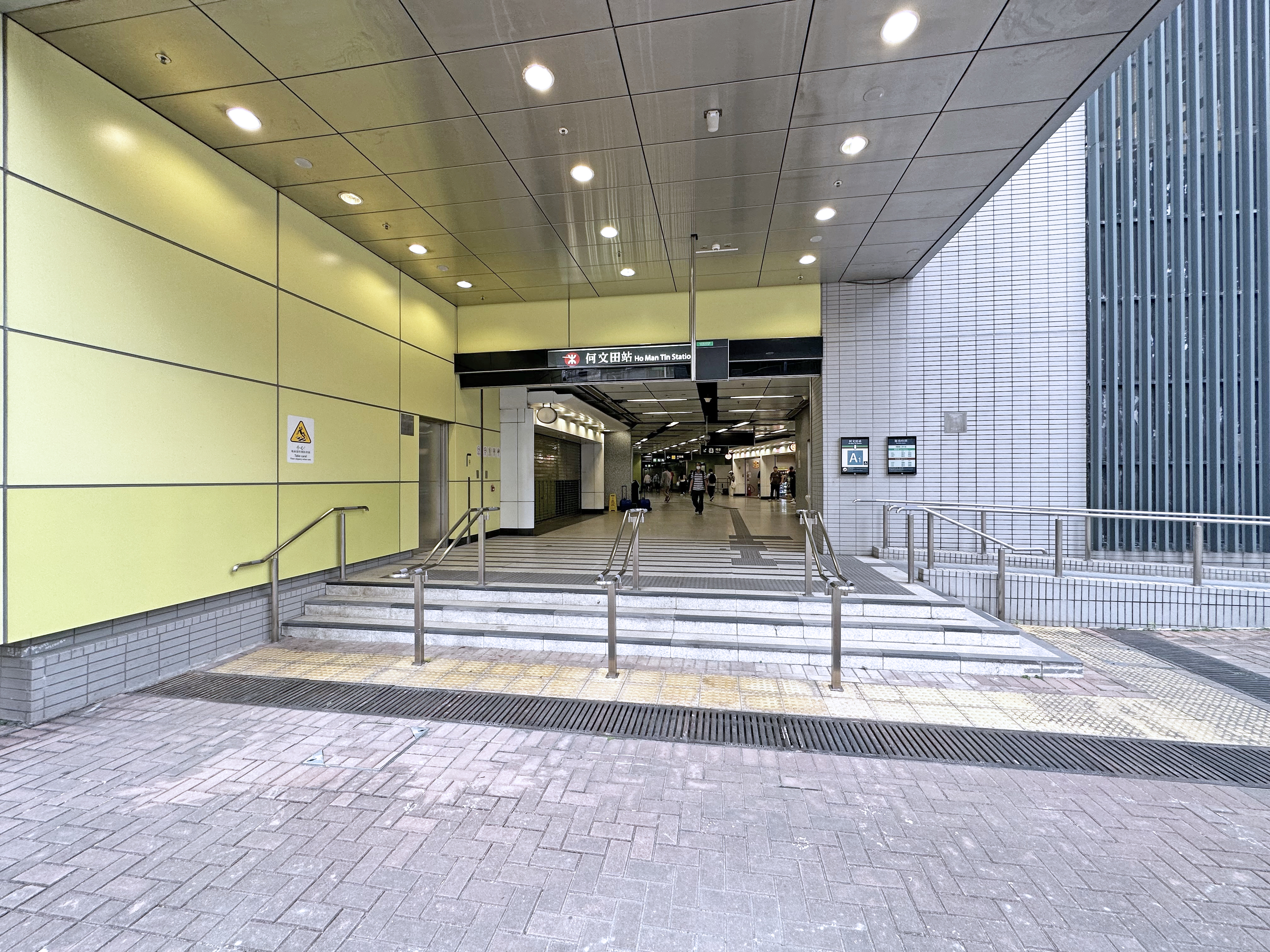
Exit A1

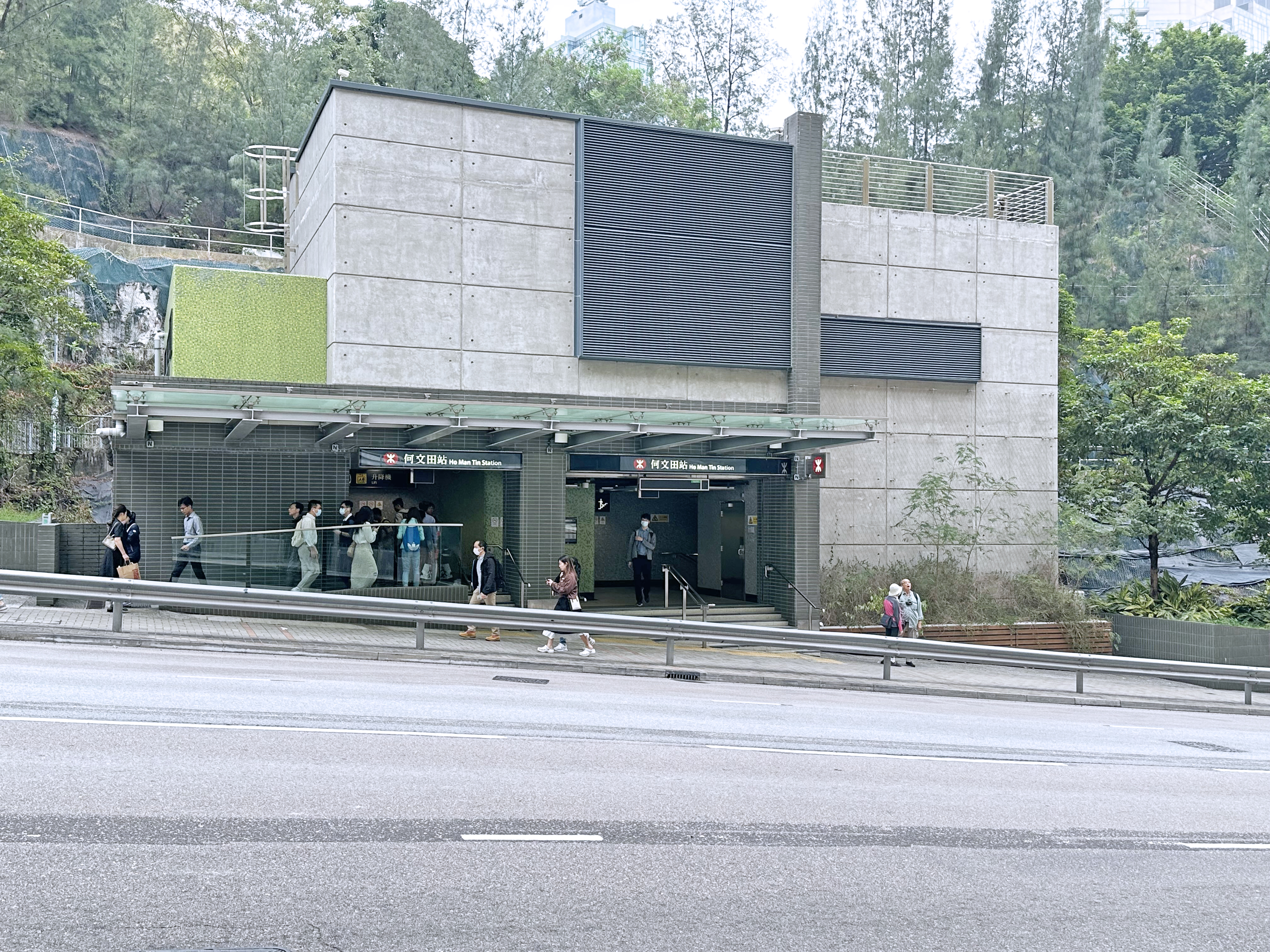
Exit A2

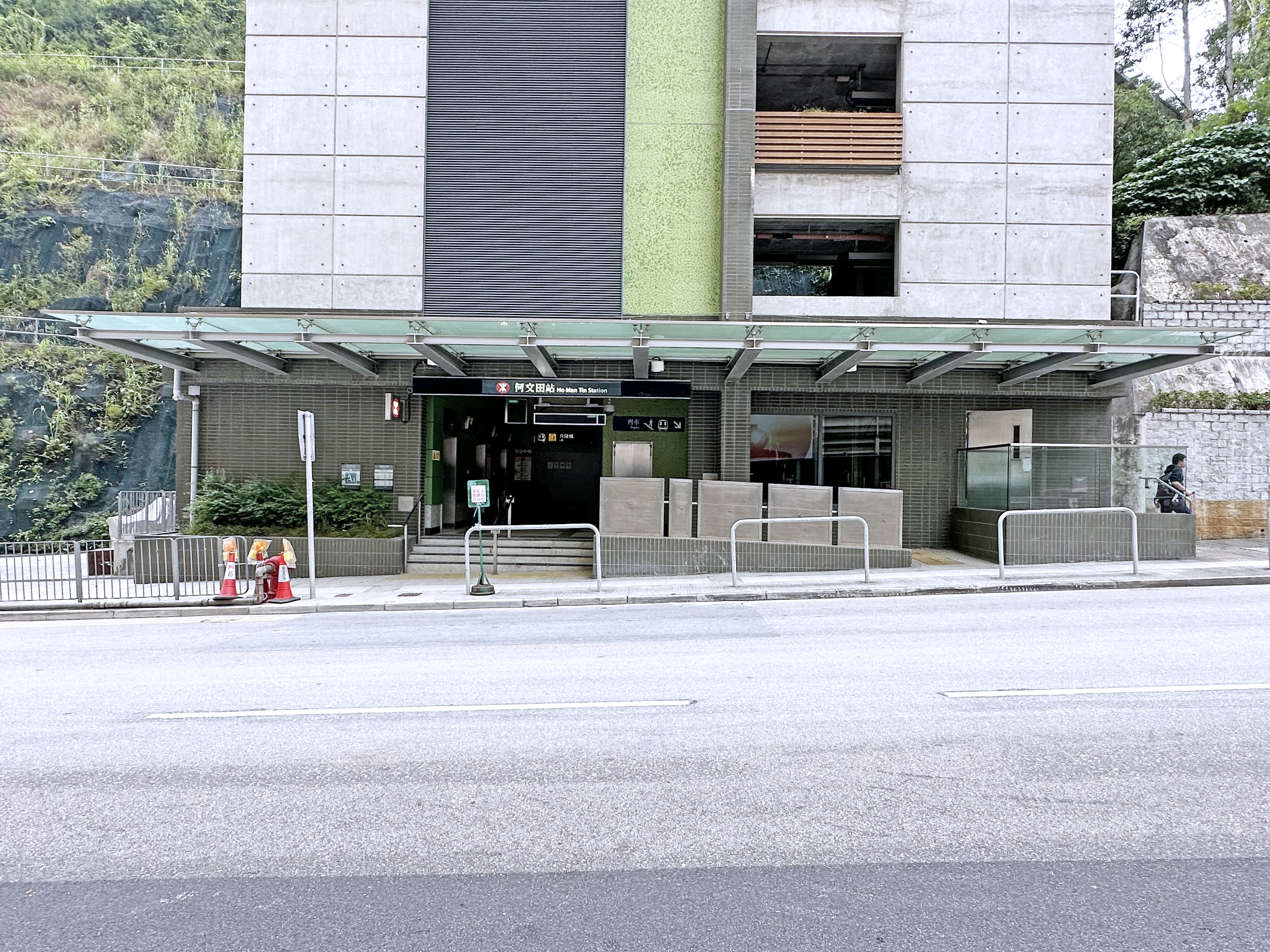
Exit A3

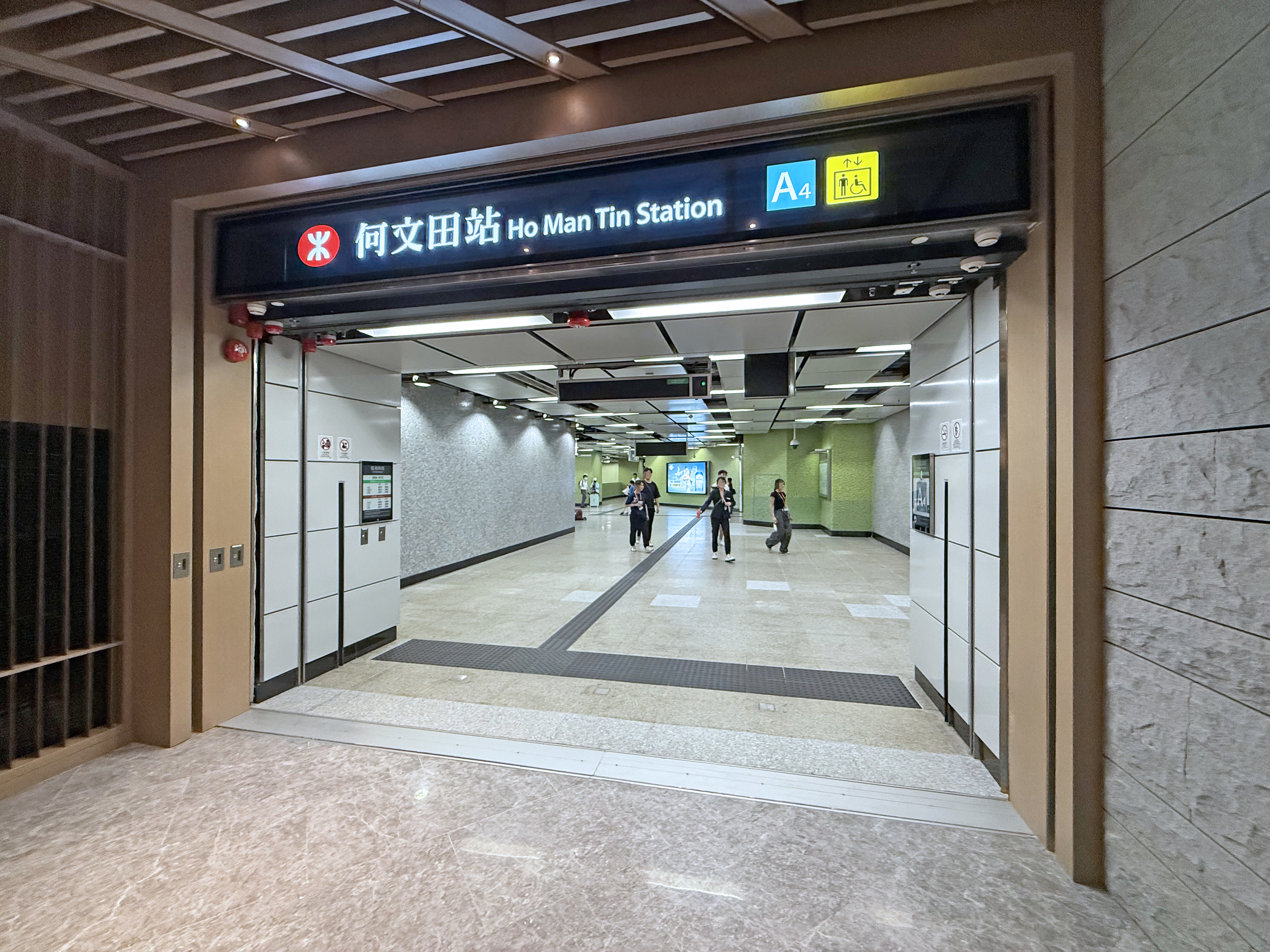
Exit A4

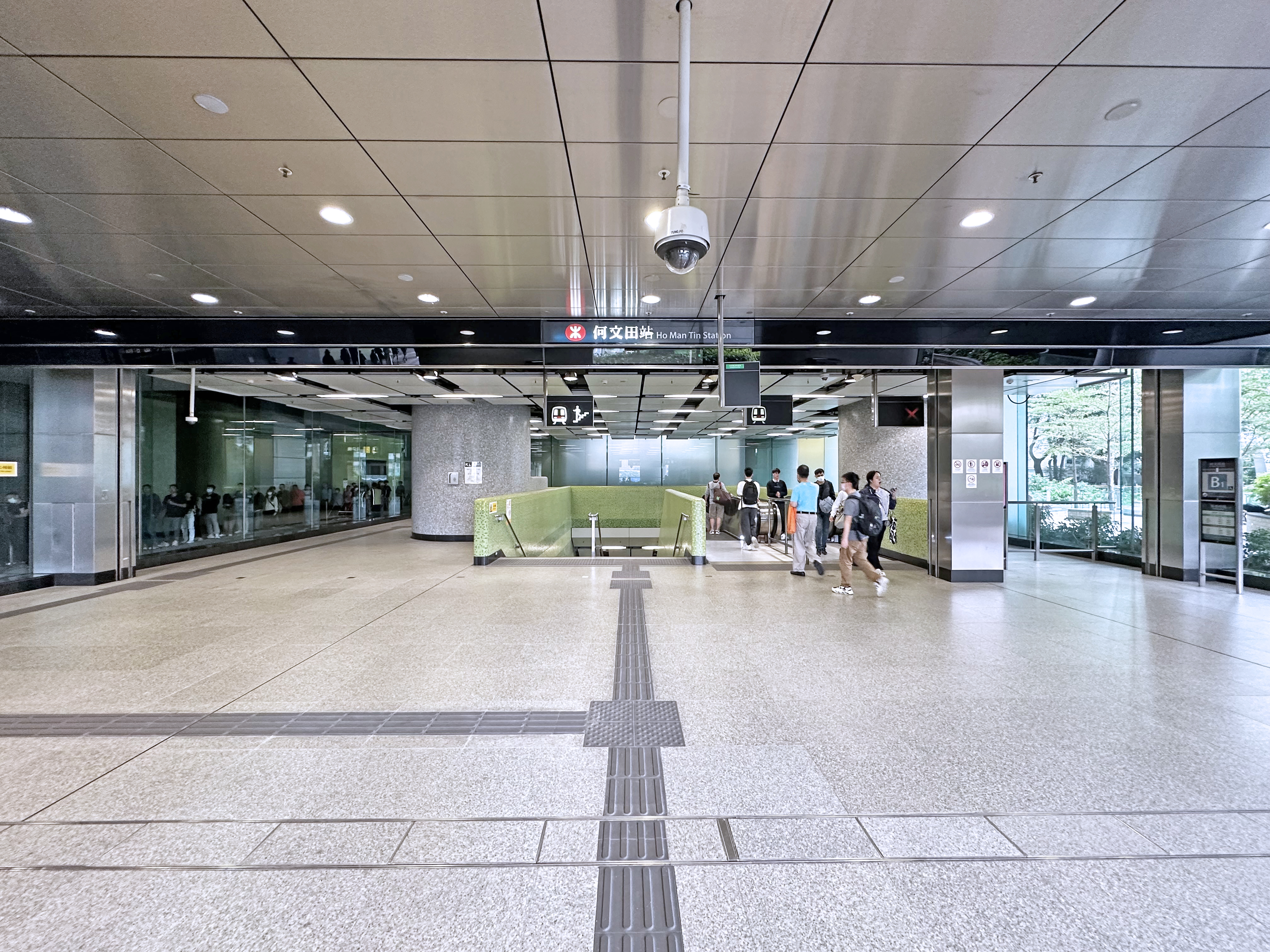
Exit B1

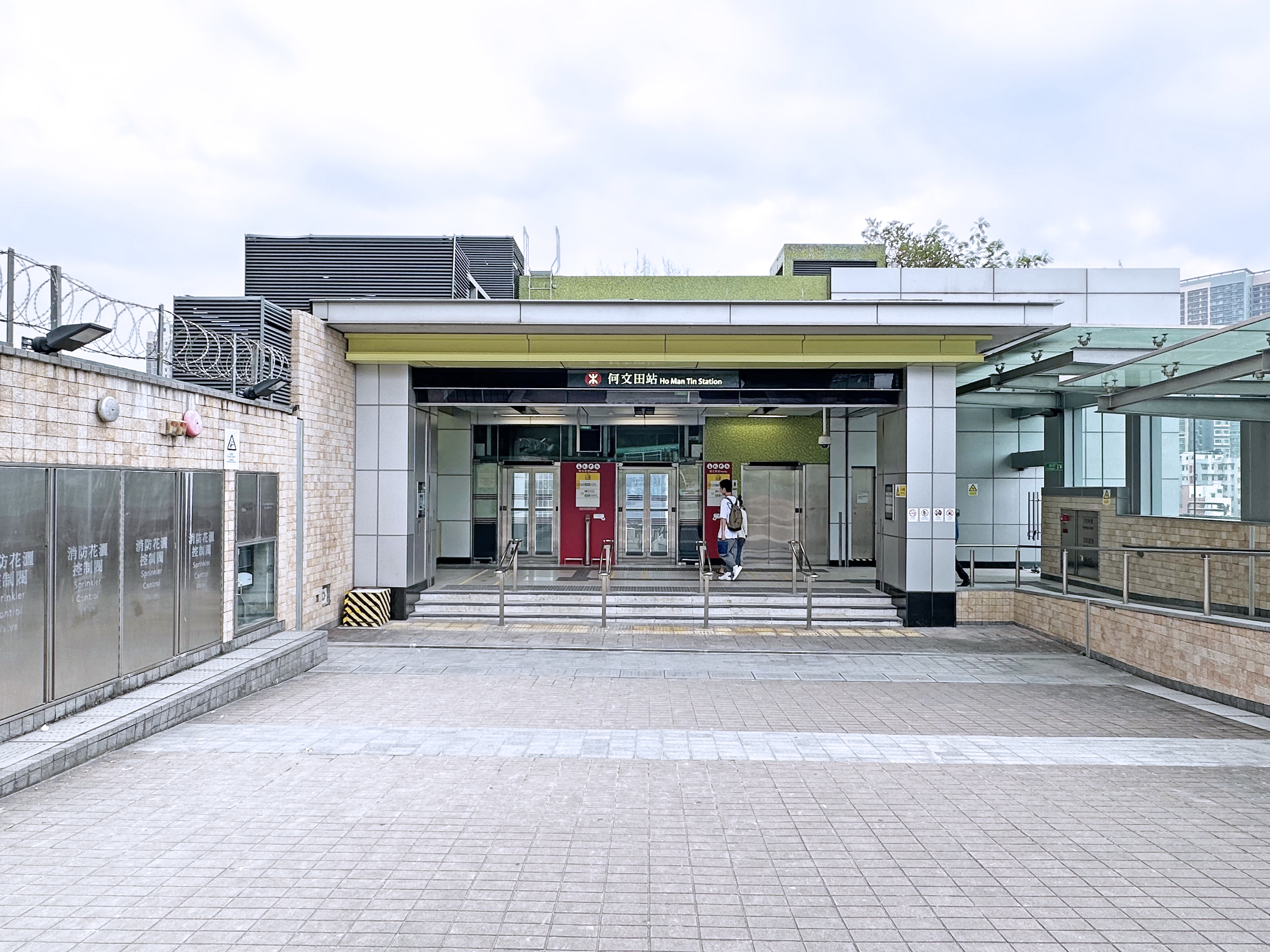
Exit B2

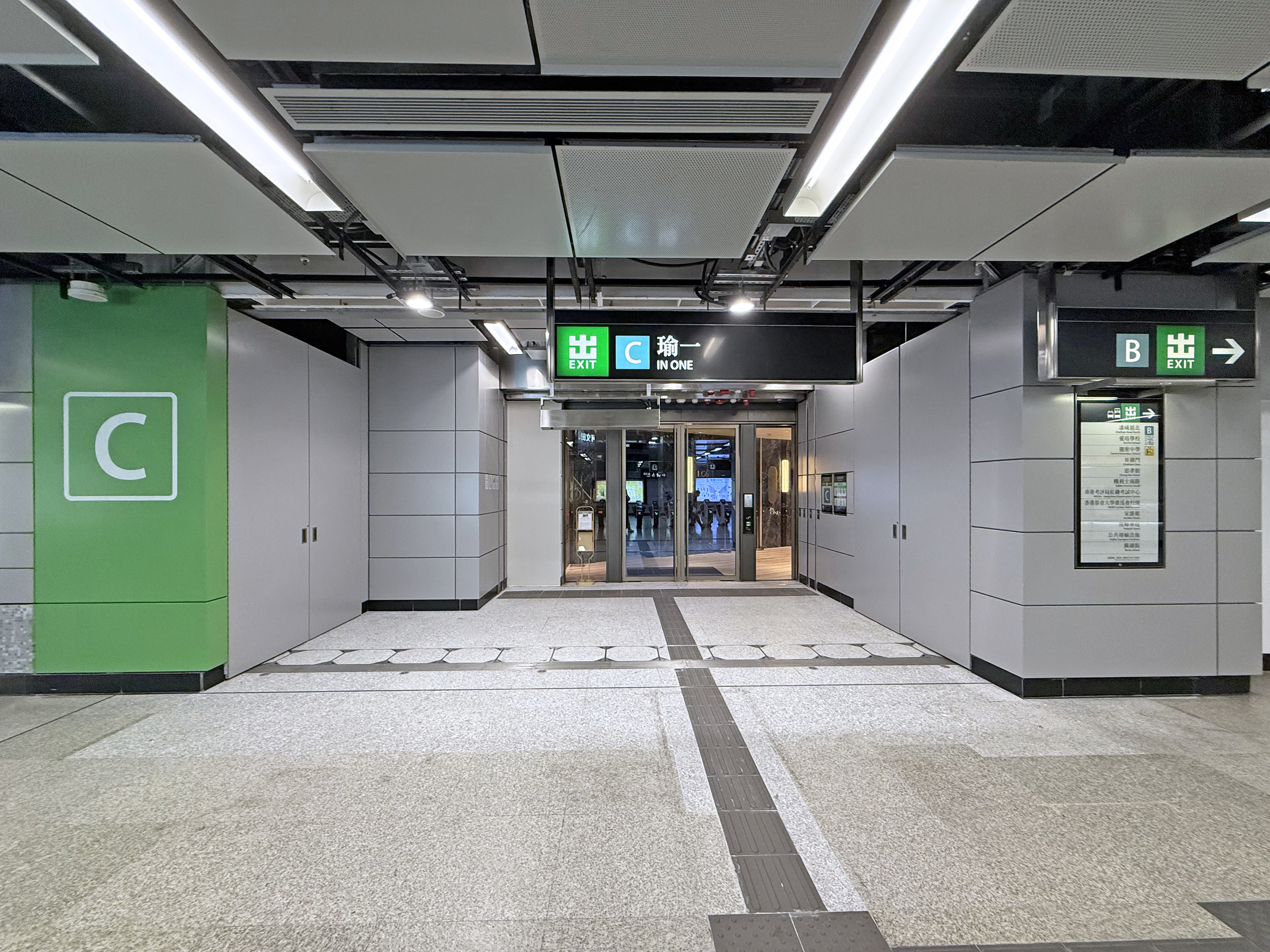
Exit C

== Gallery ==
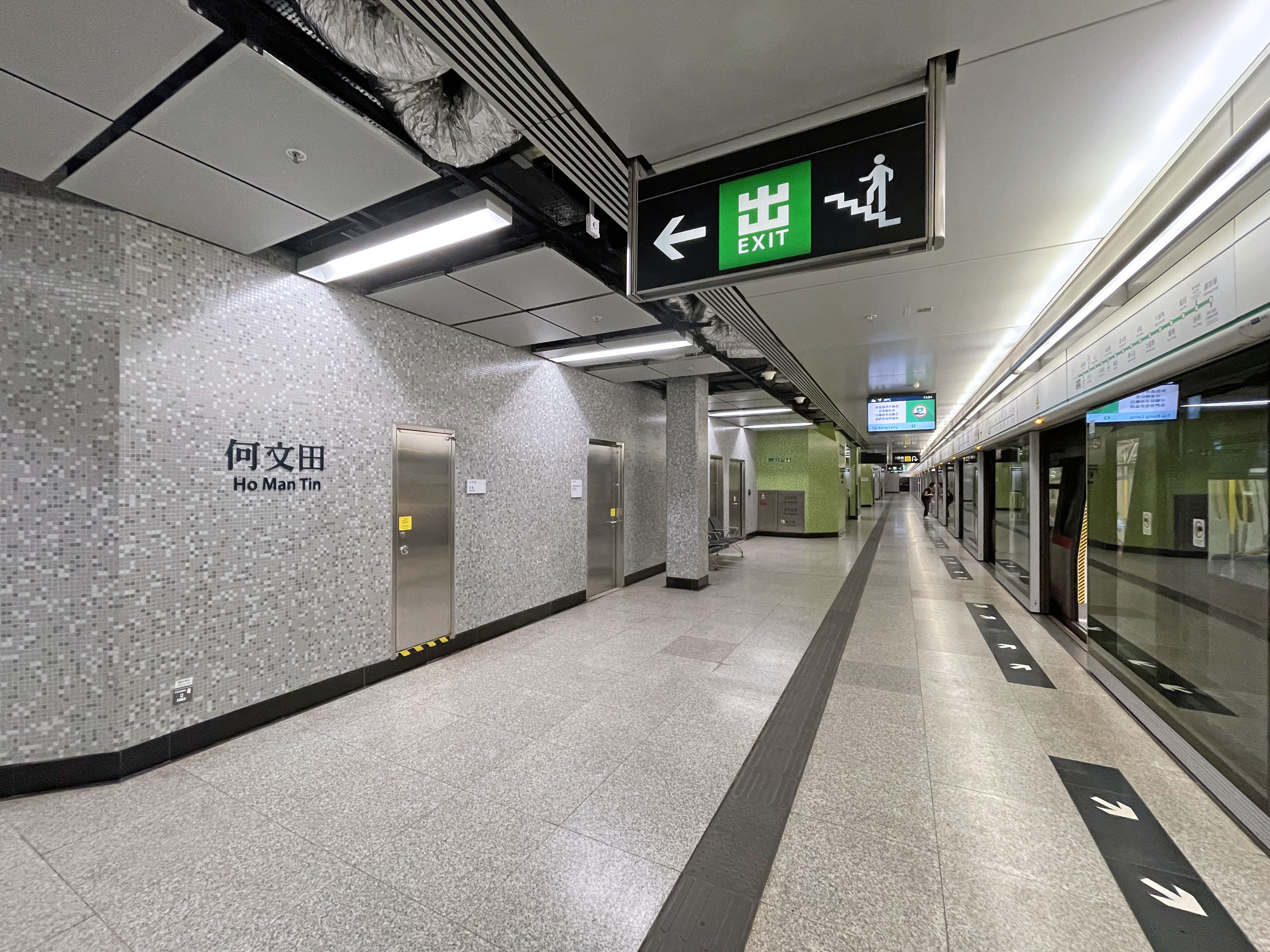
Platform 1 in June 2021

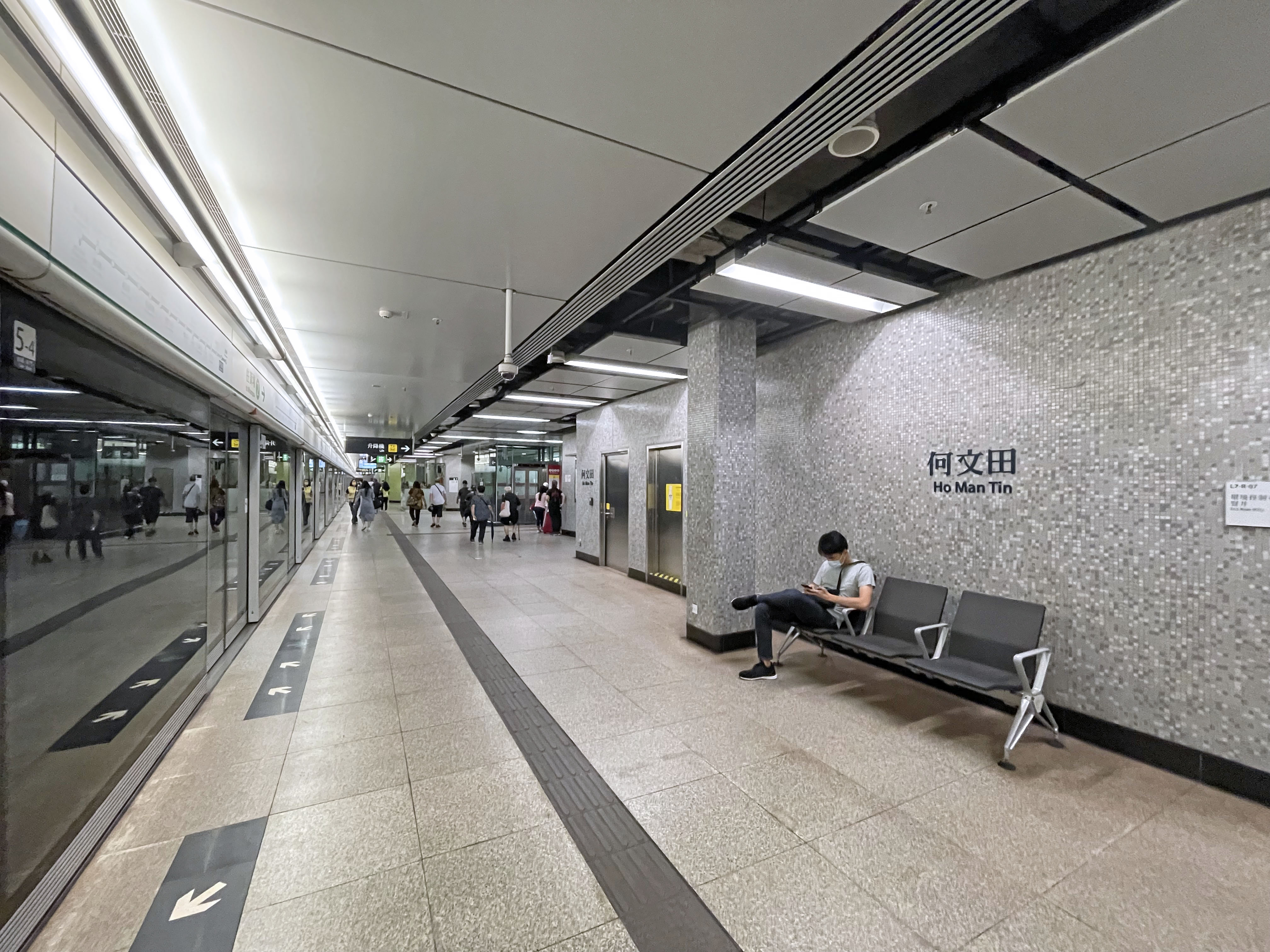
Platform 2 in June 2021

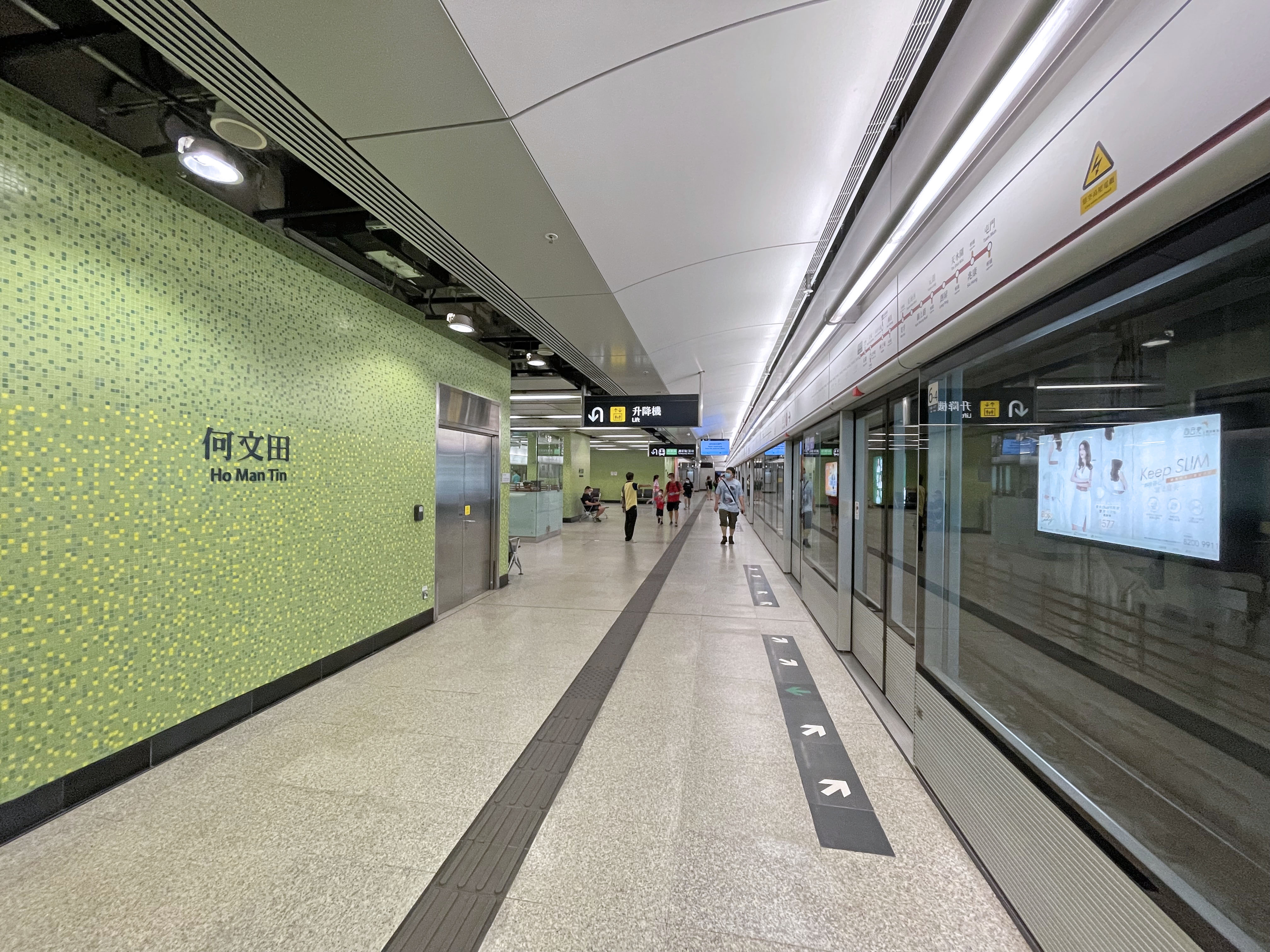
Platform 3 in June 2021

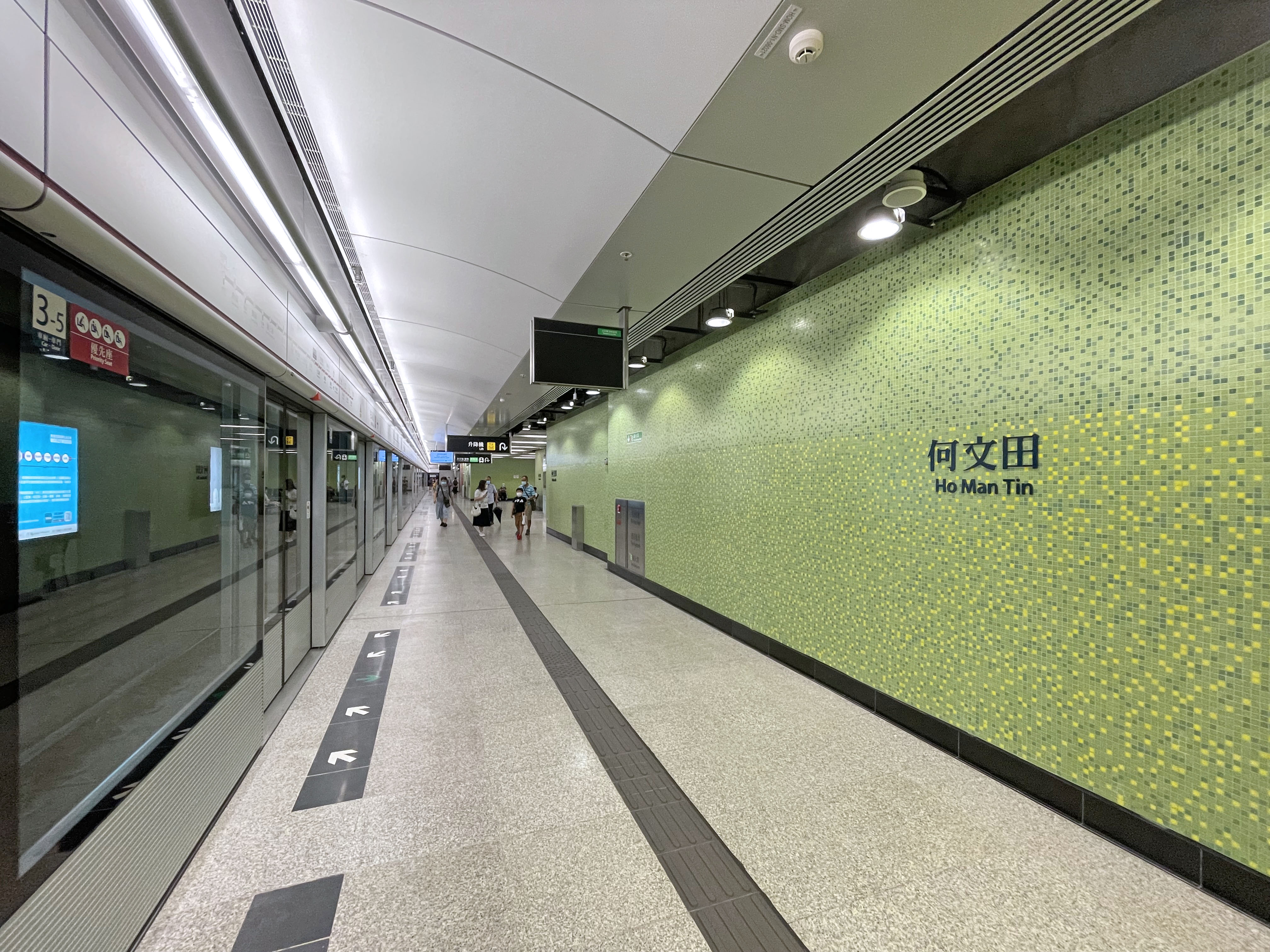
Platform 4 in June 2021

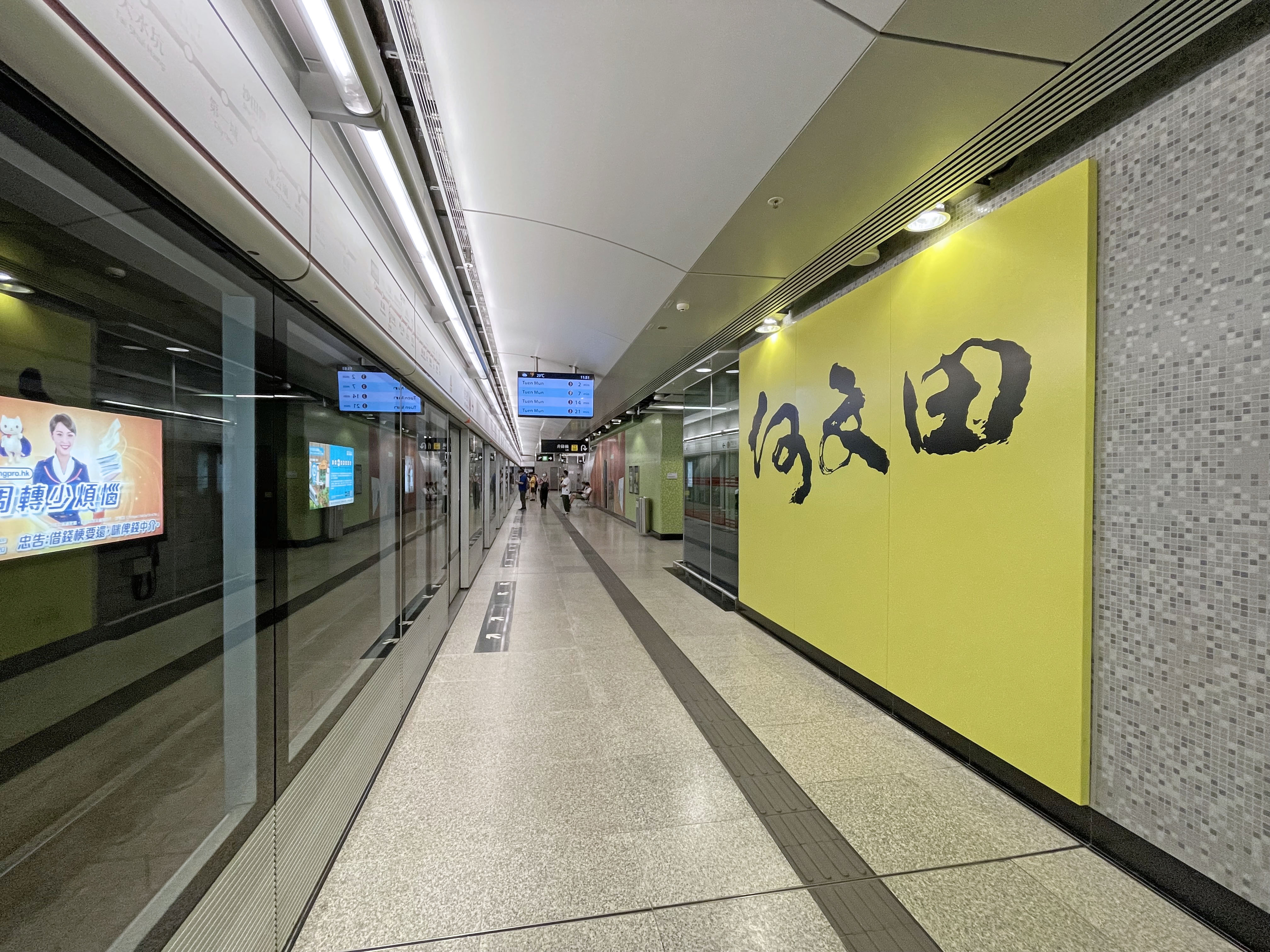
Tuen Ma line platform with calligraphy in June 2021

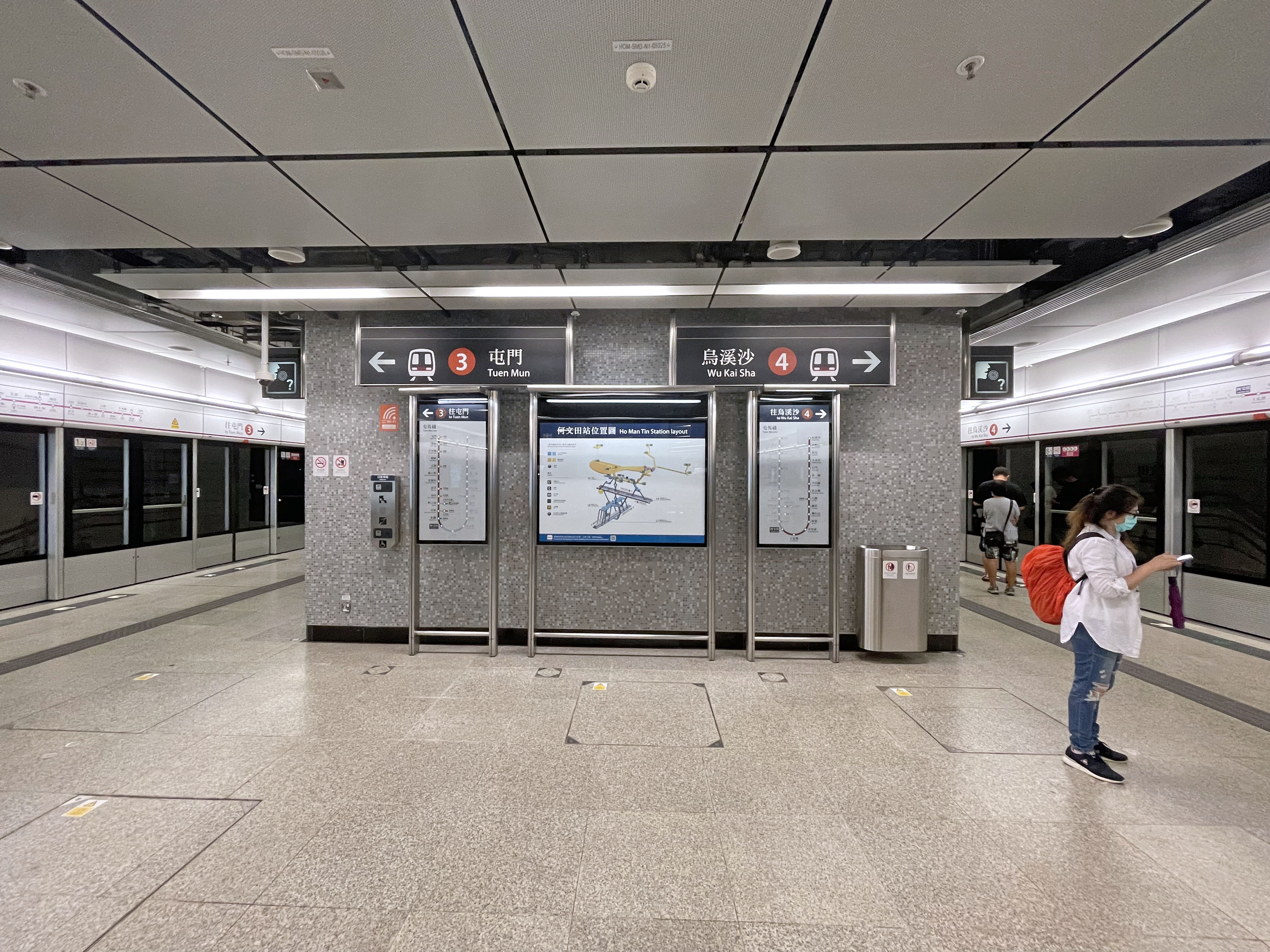
Tuen Ma line platform signage in June 2021

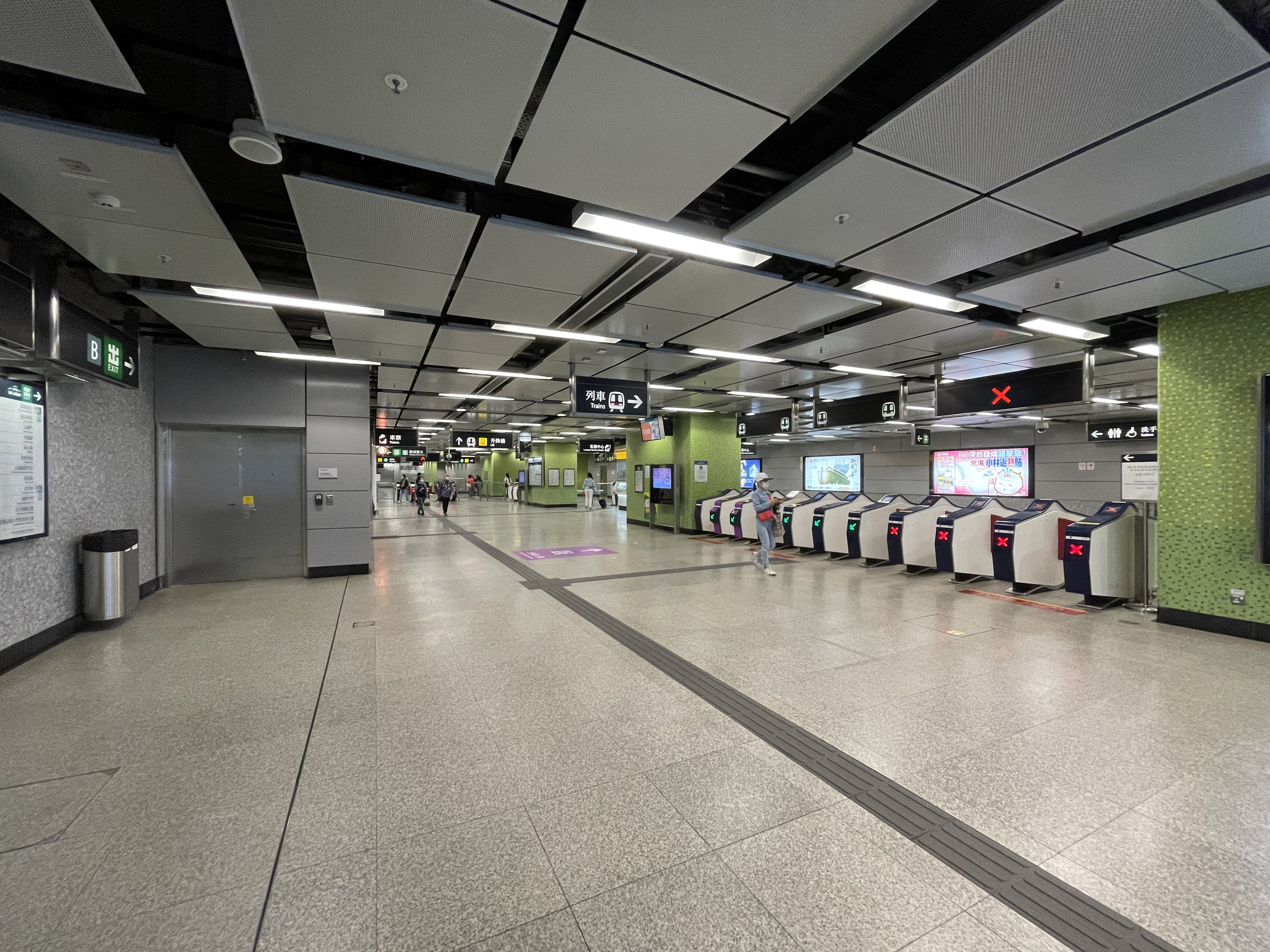
Fare Concourse in March 2021

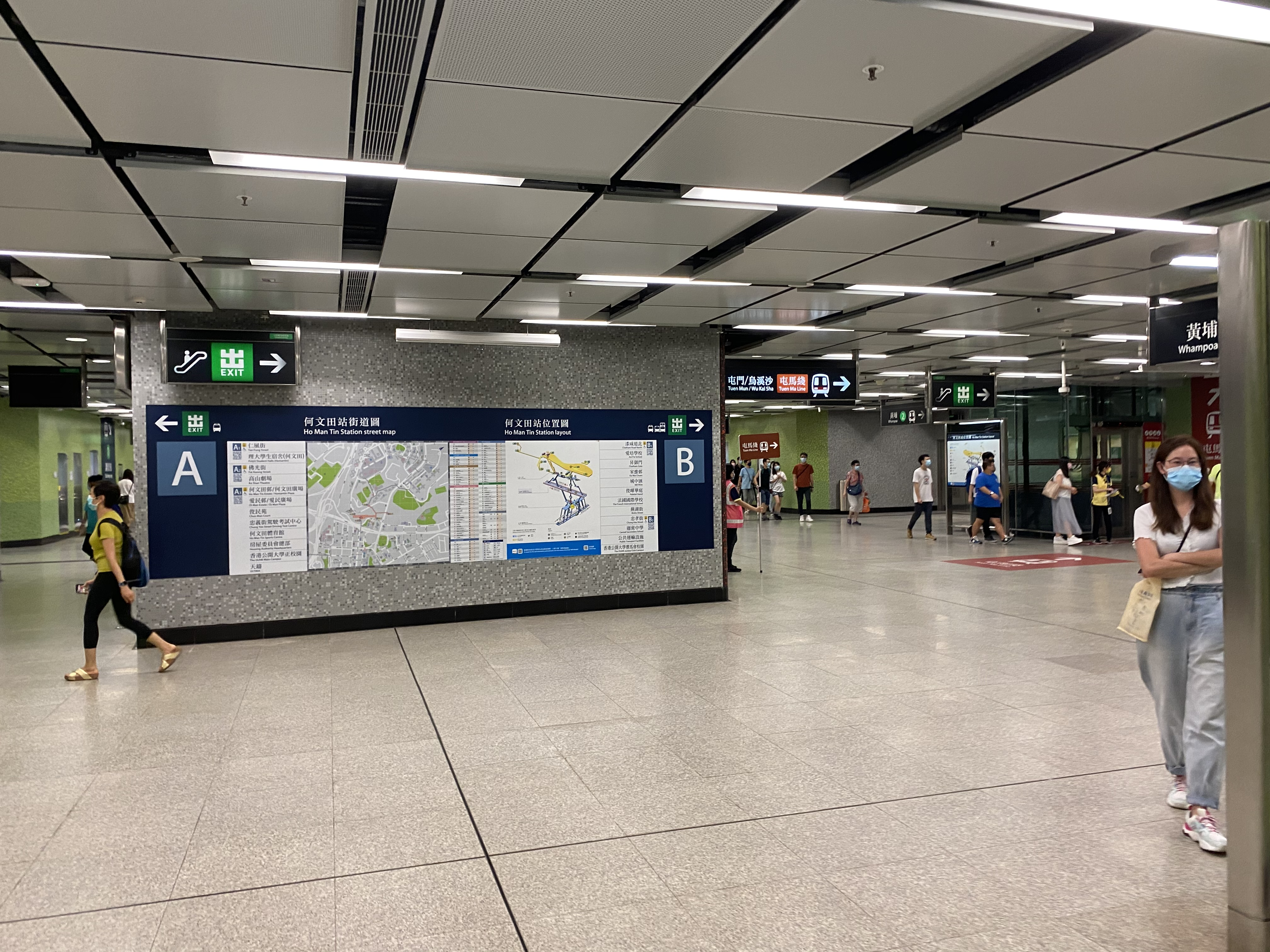
Interchange Concourse in June 2021

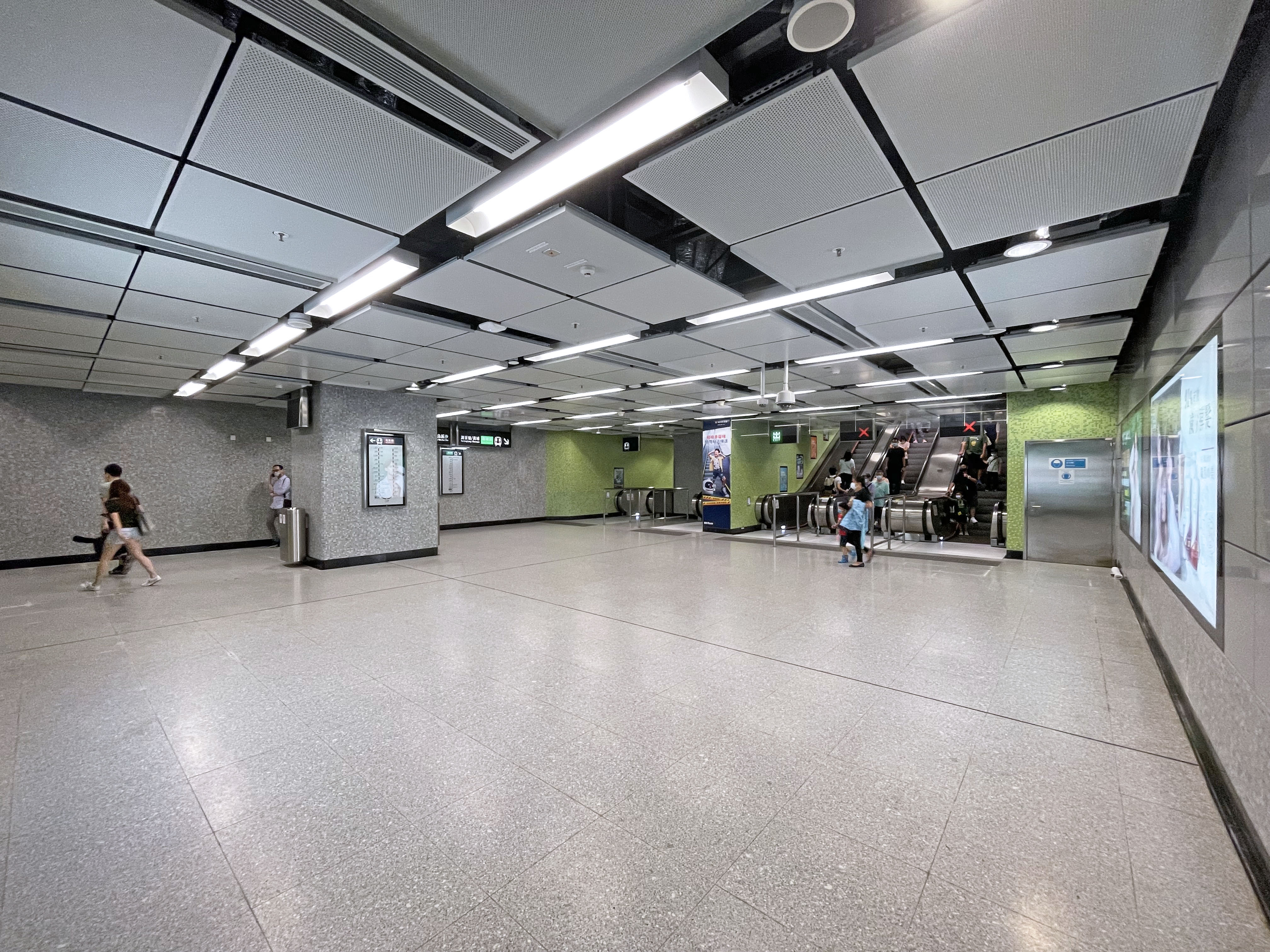
Level 3 in June 2021

== Station art ==
Multiple artwork is installed in this station. One of the artworks "Between Nature and the City" has a cat on bottom right corner. According to its creator Alex Heung, the cat is called "Ai Cow", and was owned by a Chinese medicine store in Ho Man Tin. The cat went missing in 2014 and netizens have launched a search campaign on Facebook. Through this cat, Alex highlights the connection and emotion of people, community and environment in his artwork.

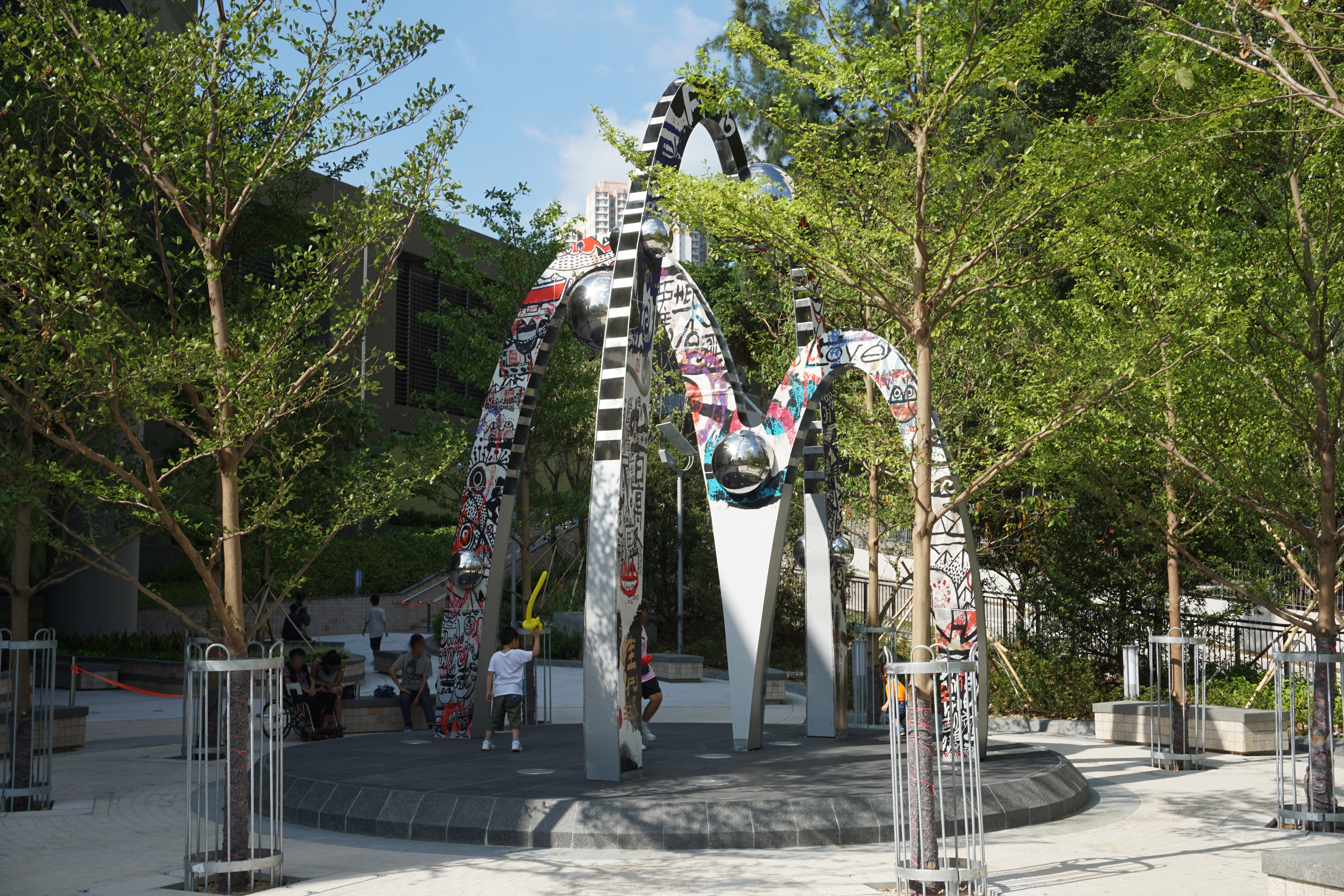
Frogtopia Arch in October 2016

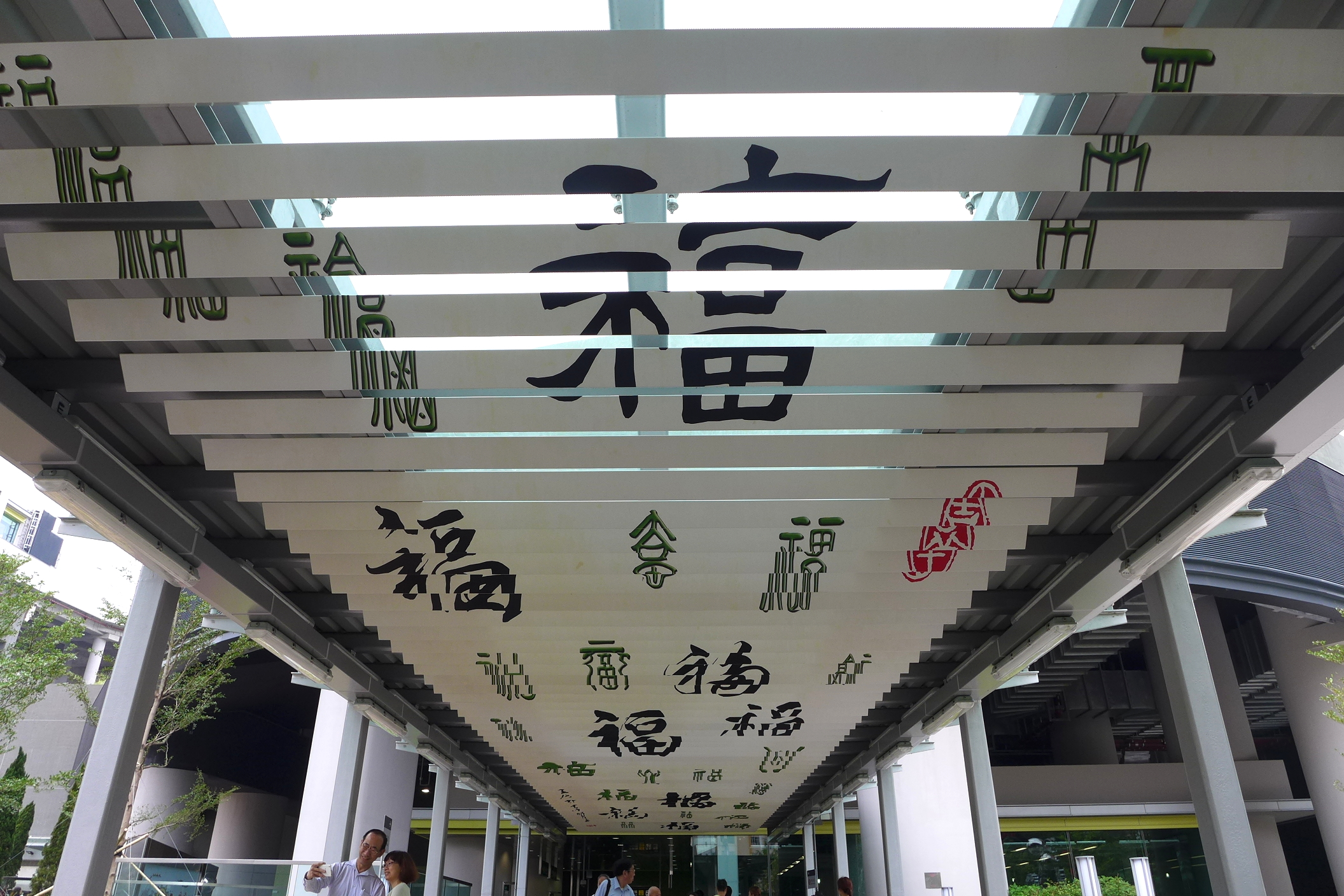
"Blessings · Bridge" with the Chinese words Blessing in October 2016

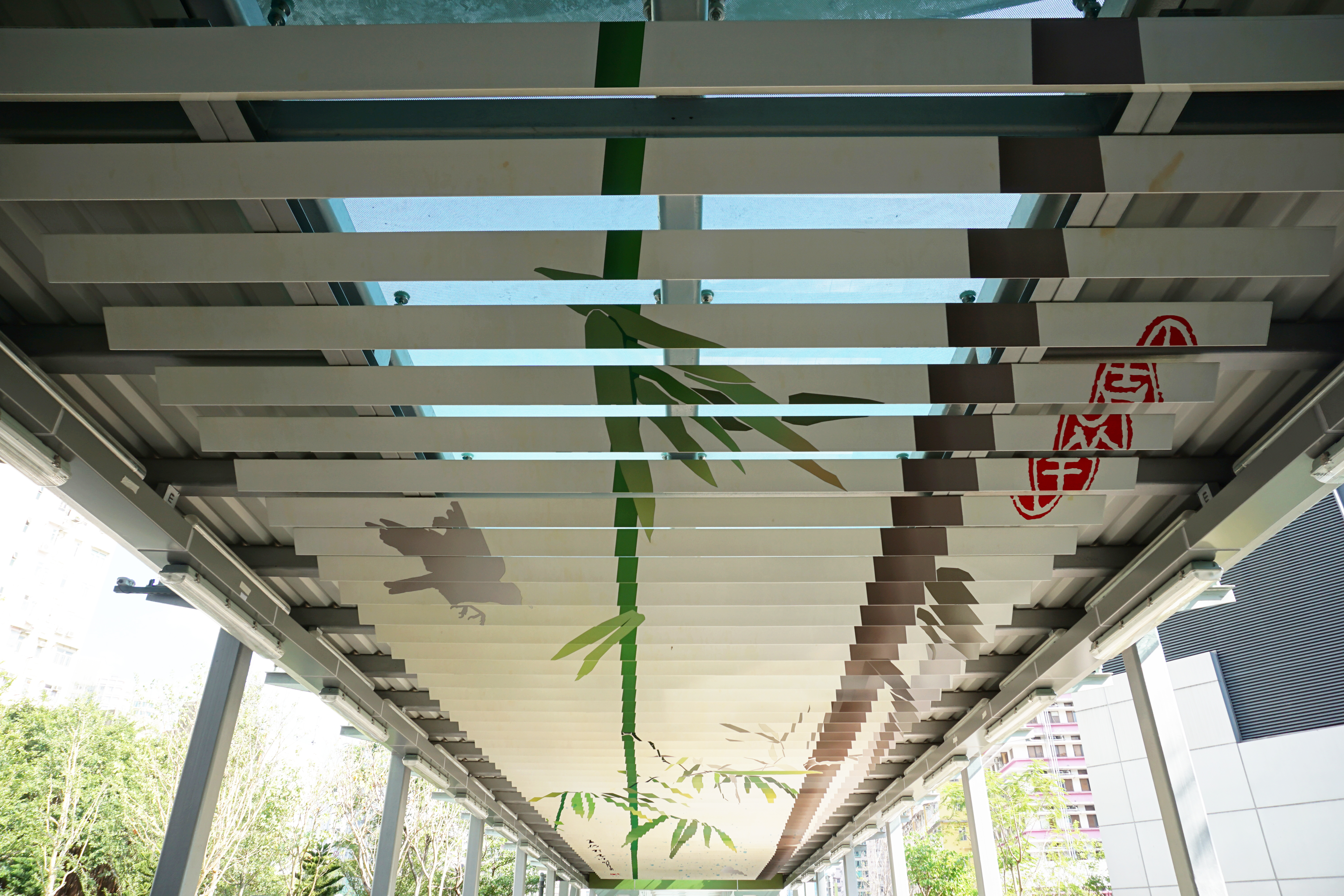
"Blessings · Bridge" in October 2016
