= Lo Lung Hang =

Valley of Hong Kong

Coordinates: 22.30824°N 114.18359°E

Lo Lung Hang (Chinese: 老龍坑; Jyutping: lou5lung4 haang1; lit. 'Old Dragon Gully') is a valley northwest of Hung Hom, Kowloon City District, Hong Kong. The place is west of Hok Yuen and it is where the Valley Road Estate was once located. The valley is less visible now, but there is still a street remaining called Lo Lung Hang Street, near Hung Hom MTR station. A railway station named Ho Man Tin station has been built in Lo Lung Hang as part of the Sha Tin to Central Link and Kwun Tong line Extension.

== History ==
At the time of the 1911 census, the population of Lo Lung Hang was 204. The number of males was 178.

== Streets in Lo Lung Hang ==
- Chatham Road North
- Gillies Avenue North
- Ko Shan Road
- Valley Road
- Yan Fung Street

== Public and community facilities ==
- Fat Kwong Street Playground
- Ko Shan Road Park
- Ko Shan Theatre
- Tsing Chau Street Playground

== Education ==
Educational institutions in Lo Lung Hang include:

- Holy Angels Canossian School
