= Valley Road Estate =

Former housing project in Kowloon, Hong Kong

Coordinates: 22.3099°N 114.1827°E

Valley Road Estate (Chinese: 山谷道邨) was a public housing estate in Valley Road, Lo Lung Hang, Kowloon, Hong Kong. It was originally a squatter area, but was destroyed by fire in 1961. In 1962, the British Hong Kong Government constructed a total of 16 blocks (Block 1 to 12, Block 14 to 17), namely the Valley Road Government Low Cost Housing Estate (山谷道政府廉租屋邨), on the site. In 1973, the estate was renamed Valley Road Estate. It was demolished between 2001 and 2002.

The Ho Man Tin station of the MTR, an interchange station between the Kwun Tong line and Sha Tin to Central Link, was built on part of the vacant site of the former estate. In June 2010, another part of the site was sold to Sun Hung Kai Properties for HK$10.9 billion through land auction. Its auction price was the second highest in Hong Kong property history.

== See also ==
- Public housing in Hong Kong
