= Hok Yuen =

Coordinates: 22.31057°N 114.19005°E

- Traditional Chinese: 鶴園
- Simplified Chinese: 鹤园
Transcriptions
Standard Mandarin
- Hanyu Pinyin: Hè Yuán
Yue: Cantonese
- Jyutping: hok6 jyun4

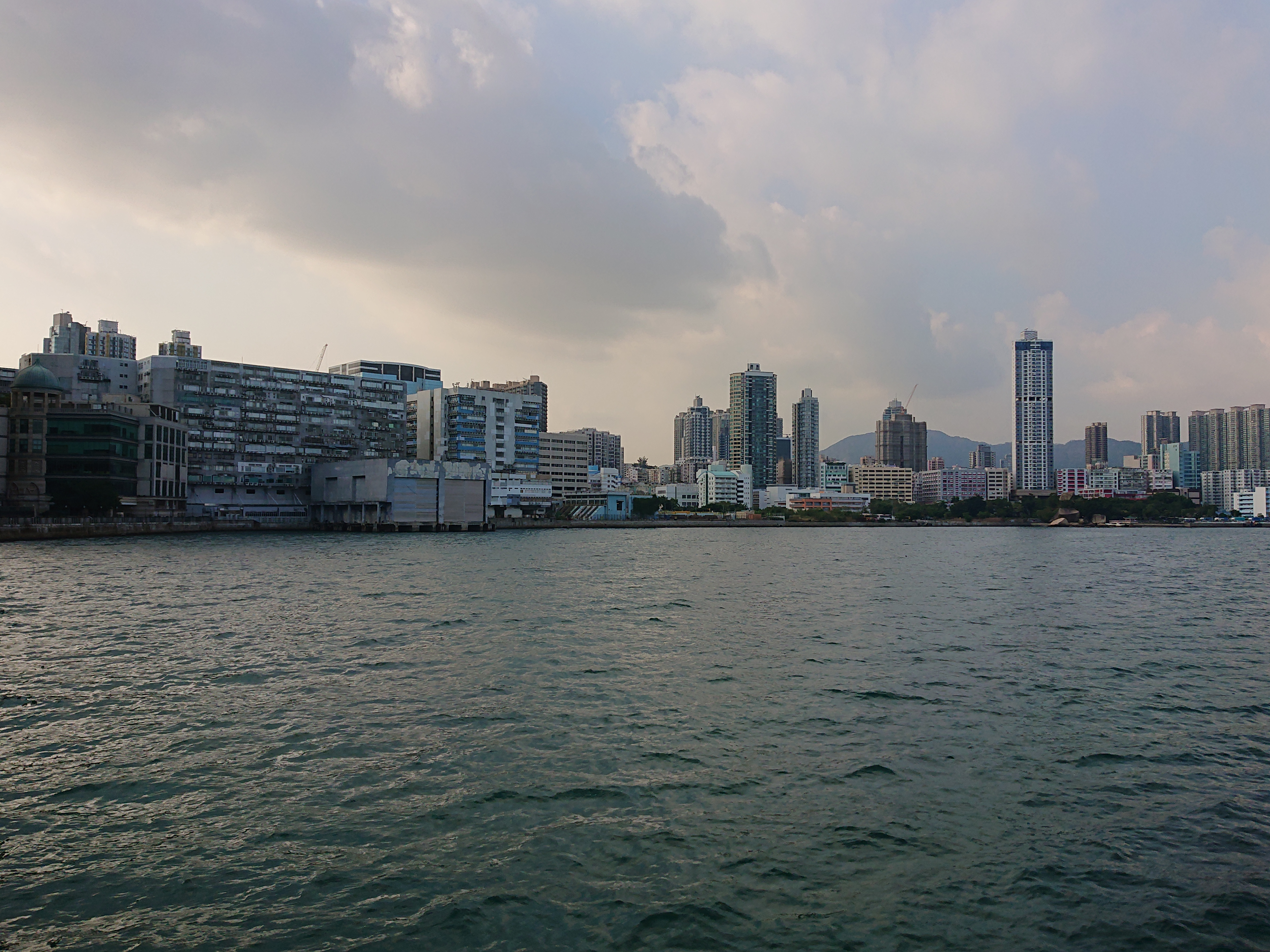
Hok Yuen as viewed from Victoria Harbour

Hok Yuen (Chinese: 鶴園) or formerly Hok Un is a place in at the southeastern coast of Kowloon Peninsula, Hong Kong. It is at the north of Hung Hom, south of Quarry Hill and east of Lo Lung Hang.

== History ==
At the time of the 1911 census, the population of Tin Wan was 1,272. The number of males was 789.
