= Ko Shan Road Park =

Park in Kowloon, Hong Kong

- 高山道公園
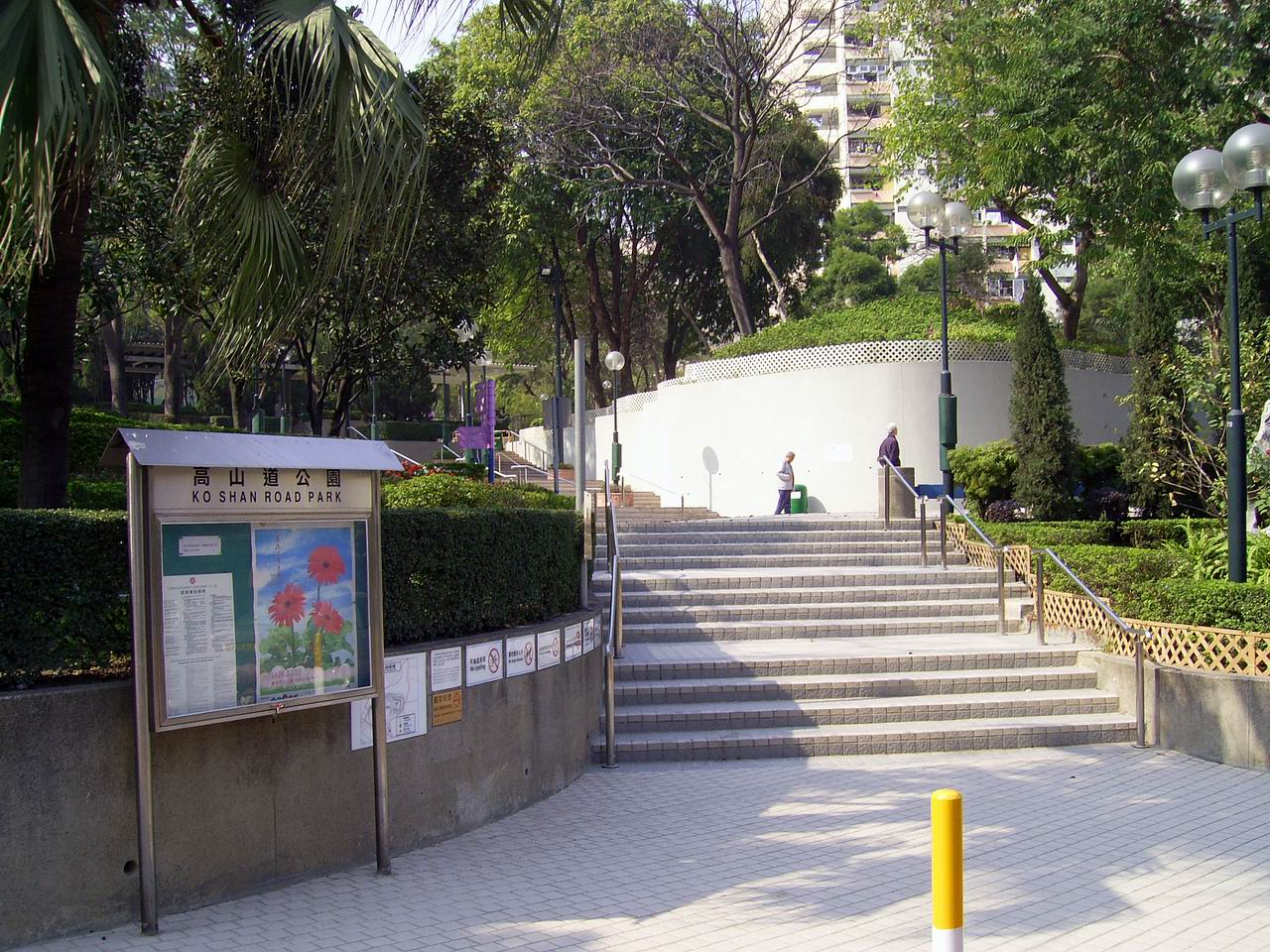
- Entrance of Ko Shan Road Park along Ko Shan Road
- Interactive map of Ko Shan Road Park
- Type: Urban park
- Location: Lo Lung Hang, Kowloon, Hong Kong
- Coordinates: 22.31398°N 114.18570°E
- Status: Open

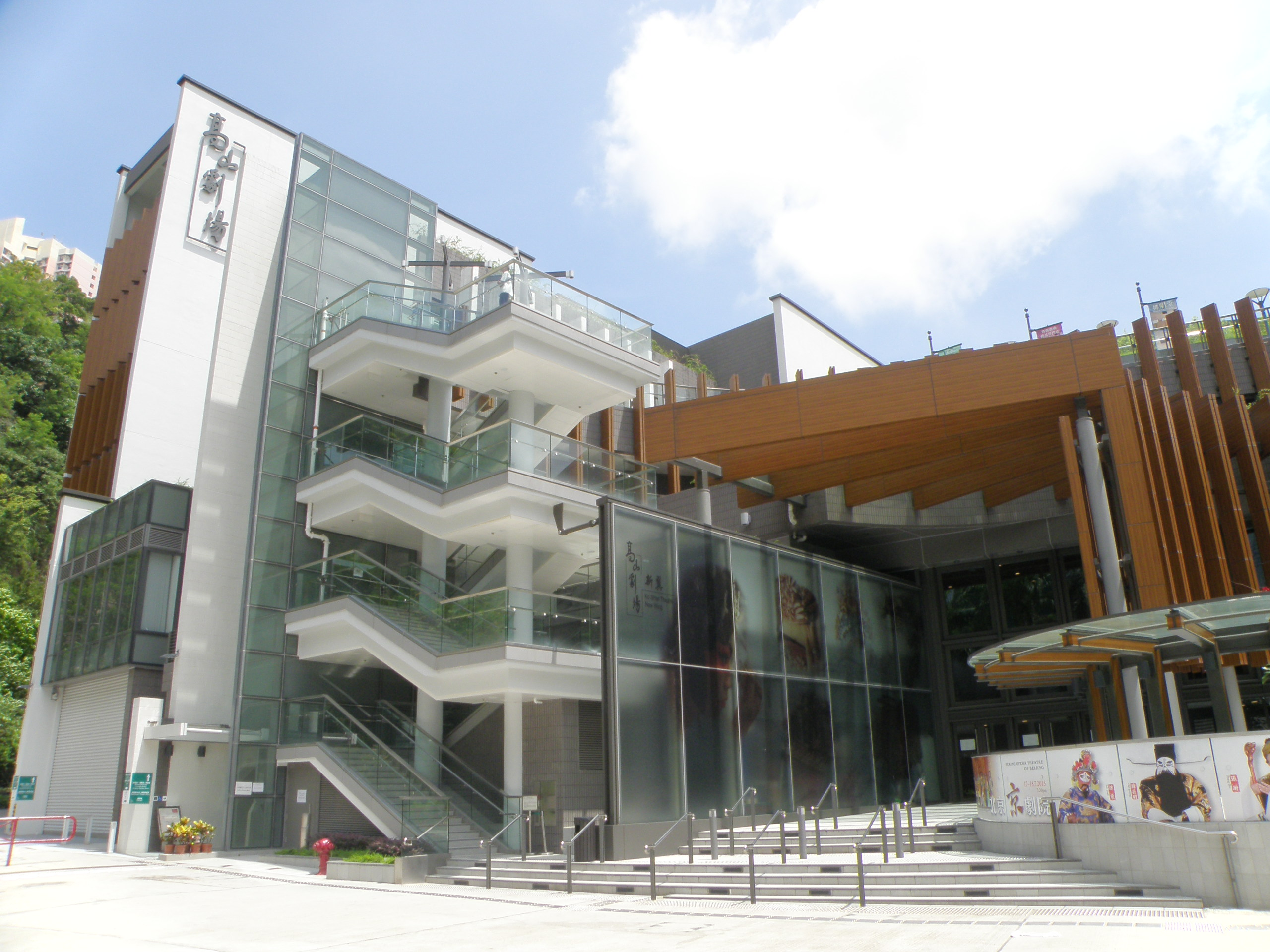
Ko Shan Theatre New Wing

Ko Shan Road Park (Chinese: 高山道公園) is a small park located in the Lo Lung Hang area of Kowloon, Hong Kong. Perched on a cut slope of Quarry Hill, the park is home to the Ko Shan Theatre (高山劇場).

== Ko Shan Theatre ==
First opened on 29 March 1983, the Ko Shan Theatre was designed as a 3,000-seat semi-open-air theatre. Because of poor design, it suffered from inclement weather and noise problems. An improvement project of the theatre was approved in 1994, and it was re-opened in October 1996 after being refurbished. Today, it includes a theatre with 1,031 seats, a committee room and two rehearsal rooms.

== See also ==
- List of urban public parks and gardens in Hong Kong
