= Ray Chan (businessman) =

Hong Kong businessman

Ray Chan Chin-ching (Chinese: 陳展程; born 1984) is a Hong Kong businessman, known for being the CEO and co-founder of entertainment online platform 9GAG. He is currently the chairman and CEO of Hong Kong-listed MemeStrategy.

== Education ==
Chan grew up in Hong Kong where he and his family lived in a public housing estate. During his university days at the Faculty of Law at University of Hong Kong, Chan was a member of the university debate team.

== Career ==
Chan's first job upon graduation from the University of Hong Kong was in the legal department of a bank. Following that, he became an anchor as well as a reporter for Now TV. Soon after, he worked at an information technology company as a project manager. In 2007, he joined aNobii as a product manager.

=== 9GAG ===
While working for aNobii, he launched 9GAG as a side project. In 2011, Chan quit his job to focus on 9GAG. 9GAG was Chan's first successful website; before 9GAG, he established a website to share cosmetics and a website for information on electrical appliances, both of which failed.

9GAG secured $2.8 million seed funding from the United States, including Silicon Valley's startup accelerator, Y Combinator, and venture capital firm 500Global.

As at July 2025, 9GAG has 200 million users across various social media channels.

=== MemeStrategy ===
In 2022, Chan launched a NFT platform Memeland. In April 2025, Chan acquired a controlling stake in Hong Kong-listed Howking Technology International Holdings Limited and renamed it MemeStrategy. Chan became the chairman and CEO of MemeStrategy, and a number of 9GAG executives joined MemeStrategy. The company now focuses on advisory services for digital asset projects.
