= 9gag =

Social media website

- Company type: Private
- Website type: Entertainment
- Available in: English
- Founded: April 11, 2008; 18 years ago
- Headquarters: Tsuen Wan, Hong Kong; Mountain View, California
- Country of origin: China
- Area served: Worldwide
- Founder: Ray Chan
- Key people: Ray Chan (CEO)
- Website: 9gag.com
- Advertising: Banner ads
- Registration: Optional (required to submit, comment, vote or view NSFW content)
- Current status: Active

9gag (stylized as 9GAG) is an online platform and social media website based in Hong Kong, which allows its users to upload and share user-generated content or other content from external social media websites. Since the platform for collections of Internet memes was launched on April 11, 2008, it has grown in popularity across social media such as Facebook, Twitter, and Instagram. (Note: As of November 2017, it reached more than 38.3 million Facebook likes 16.8 million Twitter followers and 58.3 million followers on Instagram.)

== History ==
The website was co-founded in 2008 by a group of Hong Kongers including University of Hong Kong student Ray Chan, with the intention of creating an alternative online platform to email on which users could easily share humorous photos or videos. In a 2012 interview, Chan declined to explain the origins of the name "9gag". Chan later explained that the name "9gag" comes from Cantonese, where it sounds like "gou gag" which means to crack a joke or gag.

Starting the company under a "Just for Fun" mentality, 9gag's co-founders began using 9gag as a résumé-builder for the 500 Startups accelerator program. During the summer program, the 9gag team worked on other startup ideas, including StartupQuote and Songboard. Following the 500 Startups accelerator program, 9gag participated in Y Combinator's incubator and its user-base increased to 70 million global unique visitors per month. The 9gag co-founding team discontinued all other projects and shifted their focus exclusively on 9gag. 500 Startups was given equity for their aid and mentorship.

In July 2012, 9gag raised an additional US$2.8 million in funding from Silicon Valley–based venture capital, including True Ventures and Greycroft Partners. In August 2012, 9gag received another $2.8 million in funding from Silicon Valley venture capitalists, including True Ventures and Greycroft Partners, as well as individual investors like Chris Sacca, Kevin Rose, and Naval Ravikant. This funding supported 9gag's engineering team growth both in Hong Kong and in Silicon Valley. 9gag is headquartered in Tsuen Wan, Hong Kong, with offices in Mountain View, California.

=== Mobile app development ===
9gag has a mobile application on iOS, Android, Windows Phone 8, and BlackBerry 10.

In July 2012, 9gag launched an app for iOS and Android. The mobile application serves as a streamlined version of the web-based content. In summer 2014, 9gag launched 9chat where 9gag users log into their accounts and write to others by sending them a message. 9chat also added support for the creation of groups in different sections. In December 2014, 9gag launched its first game called 9GAG Redhead Redemption.

== Authorship and criticism ==
9gag users and admins may also re-post content (usually without any consent from its respective authors) from other websites (e.g. 4chan, Newgrounds, Reddit, SomethingAwful, FunnyJunk, YTMND, Instagram, etc.), replacing the source site's watermark with their own. In 2011, 9gag and 4chan disputed authorship of internet memes published on both websites, whereby each company claimed the memes originated from their own website. Ray Chan argued that "9GAG does not create memes or rage comics, but helps spread them." In a 2015 Slate article, writer Amanda Hess described 9gag's reposting of content from Instagram as part of an "online ecosystem of joke stealing".

9gag has also been criticised for discriminatory content. In 2014, linguist Albin Wagener examined 446 posts found on 9gag's main page; of these, 40 (8.97%) were clearly discriminatory. Most of the discriminatory posts involved misogyny (57.5%), followed by cultural discrimination (25%) and homophobia (12.5%). According to Wagener, 9gag brings people together in an international context, but through masculine and heterosexual symbolism and the devaluation of other groups.

== See also ==
- 1CAK
